= Proton Holdings =

Malaysian automotive company

Proton Holdings Berhad
- Formerly: Perusahaan Otomobil Nasional
- Type: Joint venture
- Industry: Automotive
- Founded: 7 May 1983; 43 years ago
- Founder: Mahathir Mohamad
- Headquarters: Shah Alam, Selangor, Malaysia
- Area served: Mainly Malaysia; See Overseas Operations for the company's overseas presence
- Key people: Tan Sri Syed Faisal Albar (chairman); Li Chunrong (CEO); Dato' Abdul Rashid Musa (deputy CEO)
- Products: Automobiles
- Production output: ▲154,611 units (2023)
- Revenue: ▲RM8.0 billion (2020)
- Owners: DRB-HICOM (50.1%); Geely Auto (49.9%)
- Number of employees: 12,000
- Divisions: PONSB Sdn Bhd; Proton Edar
- Subsidiaries: Proton R3
- Website: proton.com

Proton Holdings Berhad, commonly known as Proton (stylised PROTON), is a Malaysian multinational automotive company. Proton was established on 7 May 1983, as Malaysia's sole national budget car company until the advent of Perodua in 1993. The company is headquartered in Shah Alam, Selangor, and operates additional facilities in Proton City, Perak.

Proton began manufacturing rebadged versions of Mitsubishi Motors (MMC) products in the 1980s and 1990s. Proton produced its first indigenously designed, non-badge-engineered car in 2000 with a Mitsubishi engine. It elevated Malaysia as the 11th country in the world with the capability to design cars from the ground up. Since the 2000s, Proton has produced a mix of locally engineered and badge-engineered vehicles.

Proton was founded under majority ownership by HICOM, with a minority stake being held by Mitsubishi Group members. By 2005, Mitsubishi had divested its stake in Proton to Khazanah Nasional. In 2012, Proton was fully acquired by DRB-HICOM. Proton was the owner of Lotus Cars from 1996 to 2017. In May 2017, DRB-HICOM announced plans to sell a 49.9% stake in Proton and a 51% stake in Lotus to Chinese company Geely. The deal was signed in June 2017, and Lotus has ceased to be a unit of Proton. In July 2023, after the internal restructuring in Geely Group, the Proton brand was consolidated into the balance sheets of Geely Auto.

== Etymology ==
Proton is a Malay backronym for Perusahaan Otomobil Nasional (National Automobile Enterprise).

== History ==
=== 1980s ===
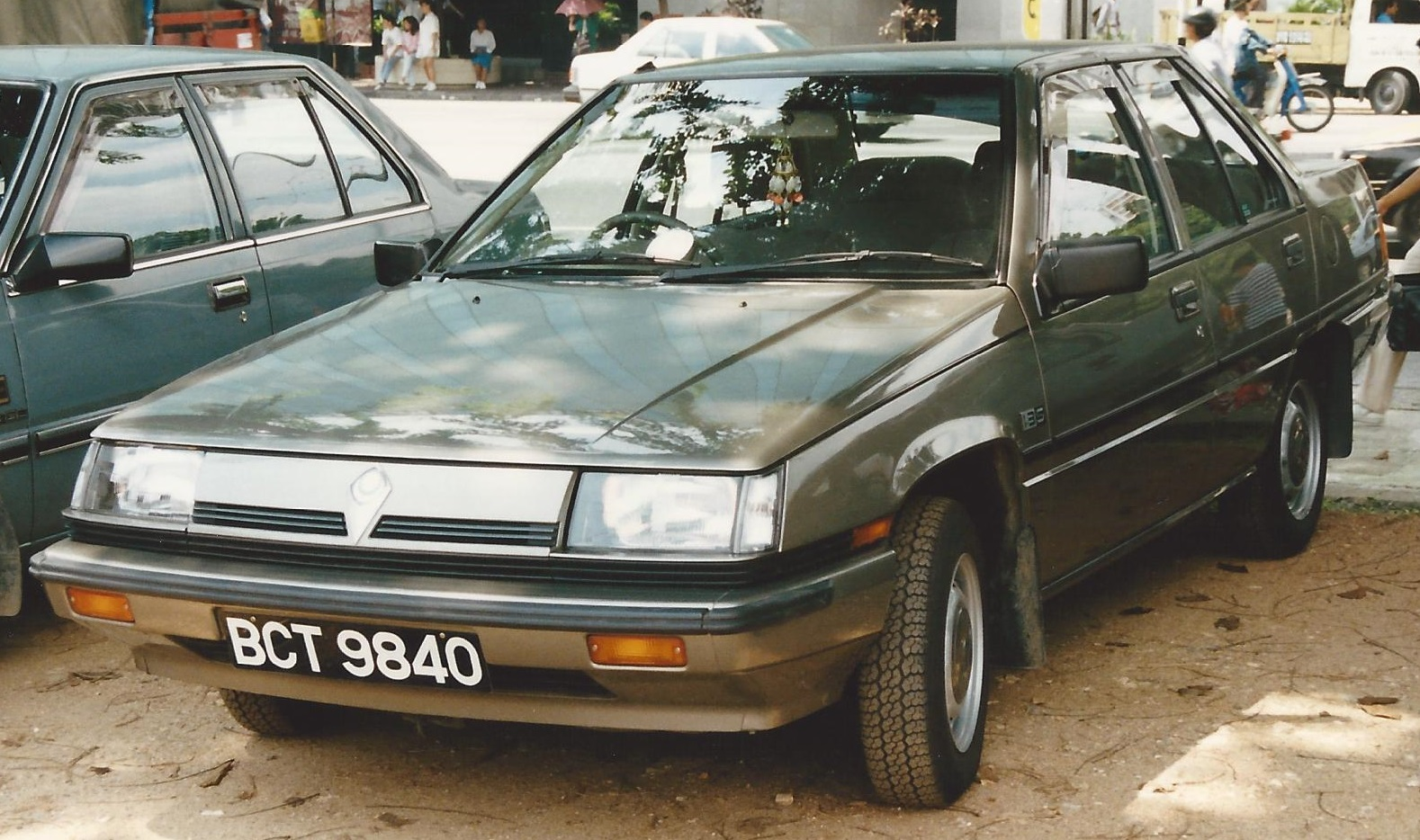
The first generation Proton Saga. More than 1.2 million units were sold between 1985 and 2008.

The concept of a national car was conceived in 1979 by then-Deputy Prime Minister of Malaysia, Dato' Seri Dr. Mahathir bin Mohamad, now Tun Dr. Mahathir Mohamad, with the goal of enhancing the Malaysian automotive industry. The National Car Project was approved by the Cabinet in 1982, leading to the participating interest of Proton on 7 May 1983, with Mitsubishi Corporation for the future of the company. At its creation, it was wholly owned by the government of Malaysia through Khazanah Nasional. It was headed by its founder, Dr. Mahathir. Proton approached Mitsubishi Motors between 1983 and 1984 and brokered a joint venture between both companies for the production of the first Malaysian car. The result of the collaboration was the Proton Saga, which launched in July 1985.

The Proton Saga was based on the second-generation 1983 Mitsubishi Lancer Fiore 4-door saloon, powered by a 1.3-liter Mitsubishi Orion 4G13 engine. The first Proton Saga to roll off the production line in Shah Alam is preserved in the National Museum (Malay: Muzium Negara) as a symbol of the beginning of the Malaysian automotive industry. Sales of the new Saga outstripped supply, and Proton did not meet the growing demand. By mid-1986, it captured a 64% majority domestic market share in the below 1600cc segment. Later in October 1987, a hatchback variant called the Proton Saga Aeroback was launched and had a more powerful 1.5L Mitsubishi 4G15 engine and a redesigned rear-end. Exports to Ireland began in 1988, and by March 1989, Proton had entered the United Kingdom car market with the Saga saloon and hatchback duo, where the Malaysian company set the record for the "Fastest Selling Make of New Car Ever to Enter the United Kingdom."

Proton's sales declined during the late 1980s as a result of the worldwide economic recession, and the lack of technical expertise in Proton's management. Kenji Iwabuchi, a former Mitsubishi Motors executive, was appointed as the managing director of Proton in 1988.

=== 1990s ===
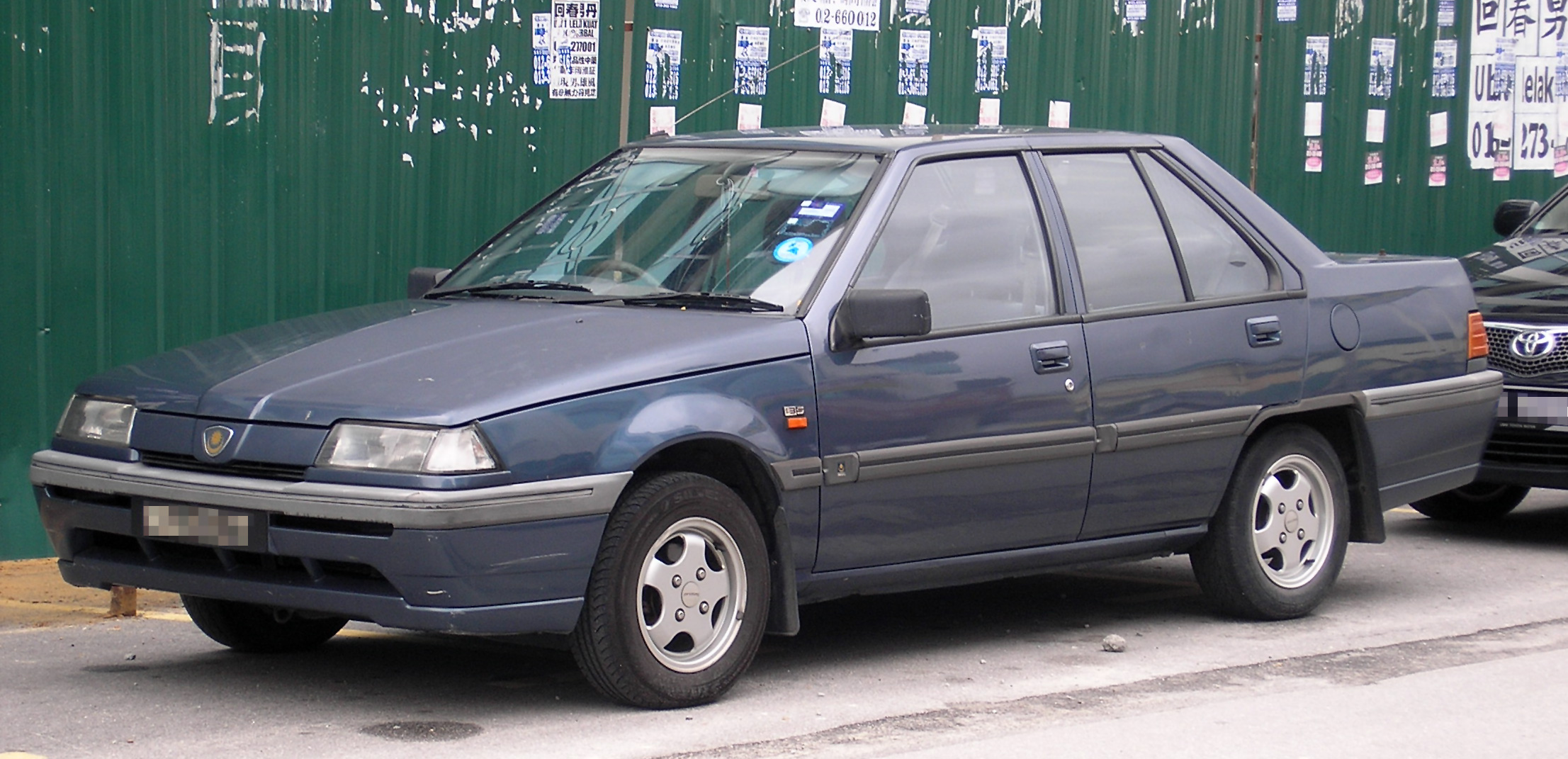
The Proton Saga Iswara saloon, widely used as Malaysian taxis in the 1990s and early 2000s.

On 15 August 1992, the Proton Saga Iswara was launched. It shares the older Mitsubishi platform used in the original Proton Saga, but its exterior and interior styling are unique to Proton. The Saga Iswara was widely used as taxicabs in Malaysia during the 1990s and 2000s, and many continue in service.

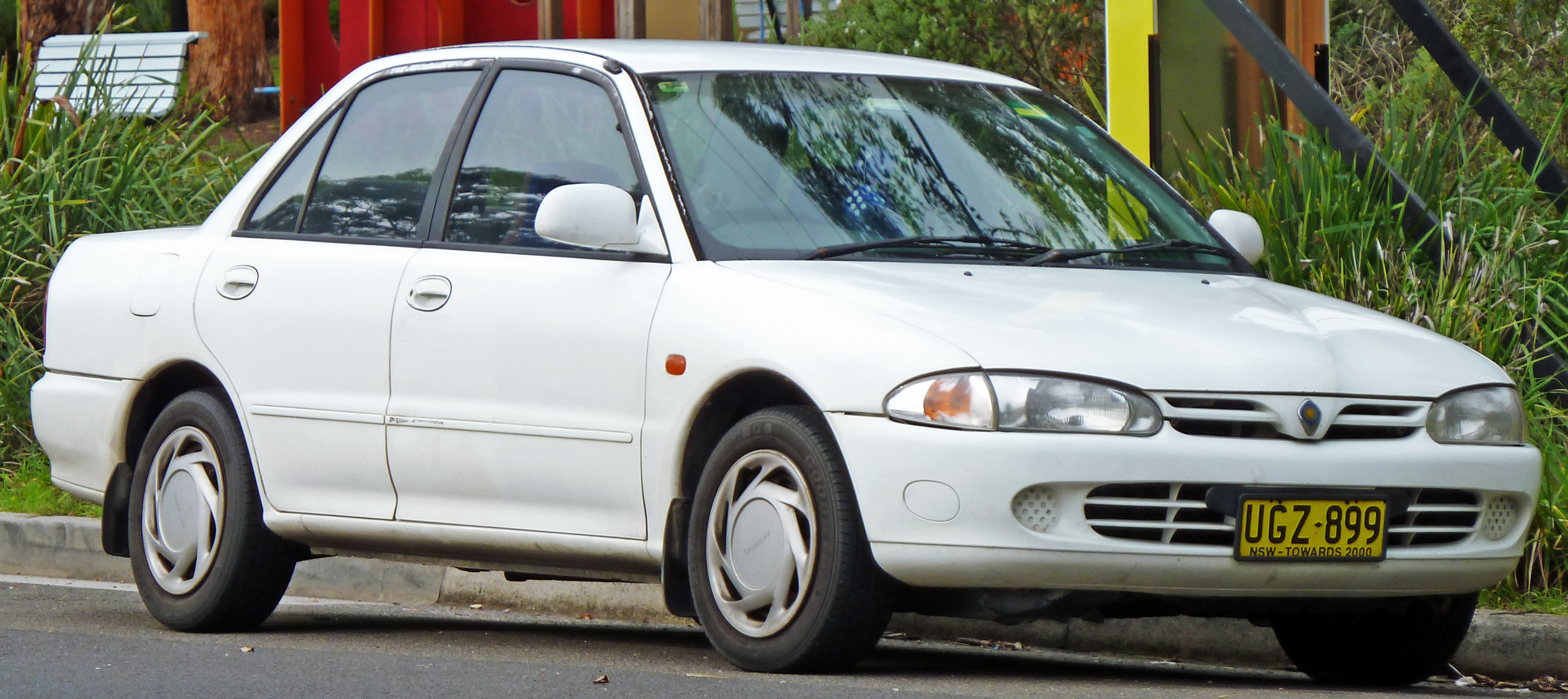
The Proton Wira saloon. Over 952,216 units were sold in around 65 countries worldwide.

On 21 May 1993 the Proton Wira was introduced. It is based on the fourth-generation 1991 Mitsubishi Lancer and was sold in a four-door saloon guise at launch. The Proton Wira Aeroback, a five-door hatchback variant featuring a Proton-designed rear-end joined the range in 1993. By 1996, the Wira saloon and hatchback shared six different engines, all of which were sourced from Mitsubishi Motors. The engines included the 4G13 1.3L and 4G15 1.5L carried over from the Proton Saga, the newer 4G92 1.6L, 4G93 SOHC and DOHC 1.8L and the 4D68 2.0L diesel. The Wira was the first Proton car to be produced in right-hand drive (RHD) and left-hand drive (LHD) configurations, and remains the only Proton car to have been available with a diesel engine.

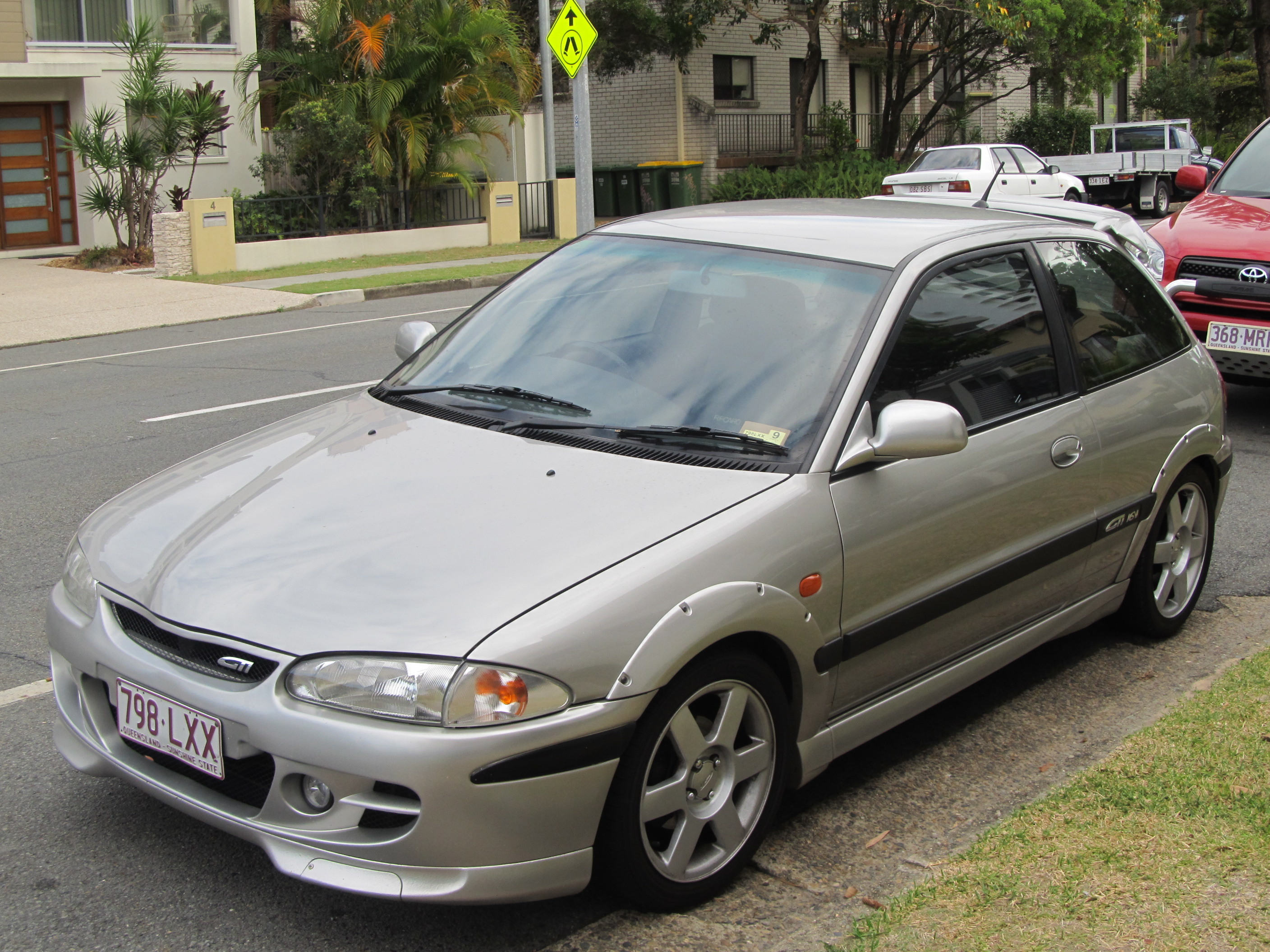
The Proton Satria GTi.

Proton launched the three-door Proton Satria hatchback in 1994 and the two-door Proton Putra coupé in 1996, both of which are based on the Wira platform and powered by the same range of Mitsubishi engines offered in the Wira, except for the 2.0L diesel. The Proton Wira, Proton Satria and Proton Putra were exported and marketed across the European Union and Middle East during the 1990s. The Proton Perdana, a premium D-segment saloon, was launched in 1995. It is based on the seventh generation Mitsubishi Eterna, introduced in 1992, and was fitted with Mitsubishi's 4G63 2.0-litre straight-four engine. It was also offered with the superior 6A12 DOHC 2.0-liter V6 engine after 1999. The Perdana remains the only D-segment, V6-powered car to be commercially produced by Proton. A Citroën AX-based 1.1-litre five-door supermini called the Proton Tiara debuted in 1996. It was the result of a joint venture between Proton and PSA Peugeot Citroën, a collaboration which was later abandoned after the death of Proton's then CEO, Tan Sri Yahaya Ahmad in 1997.

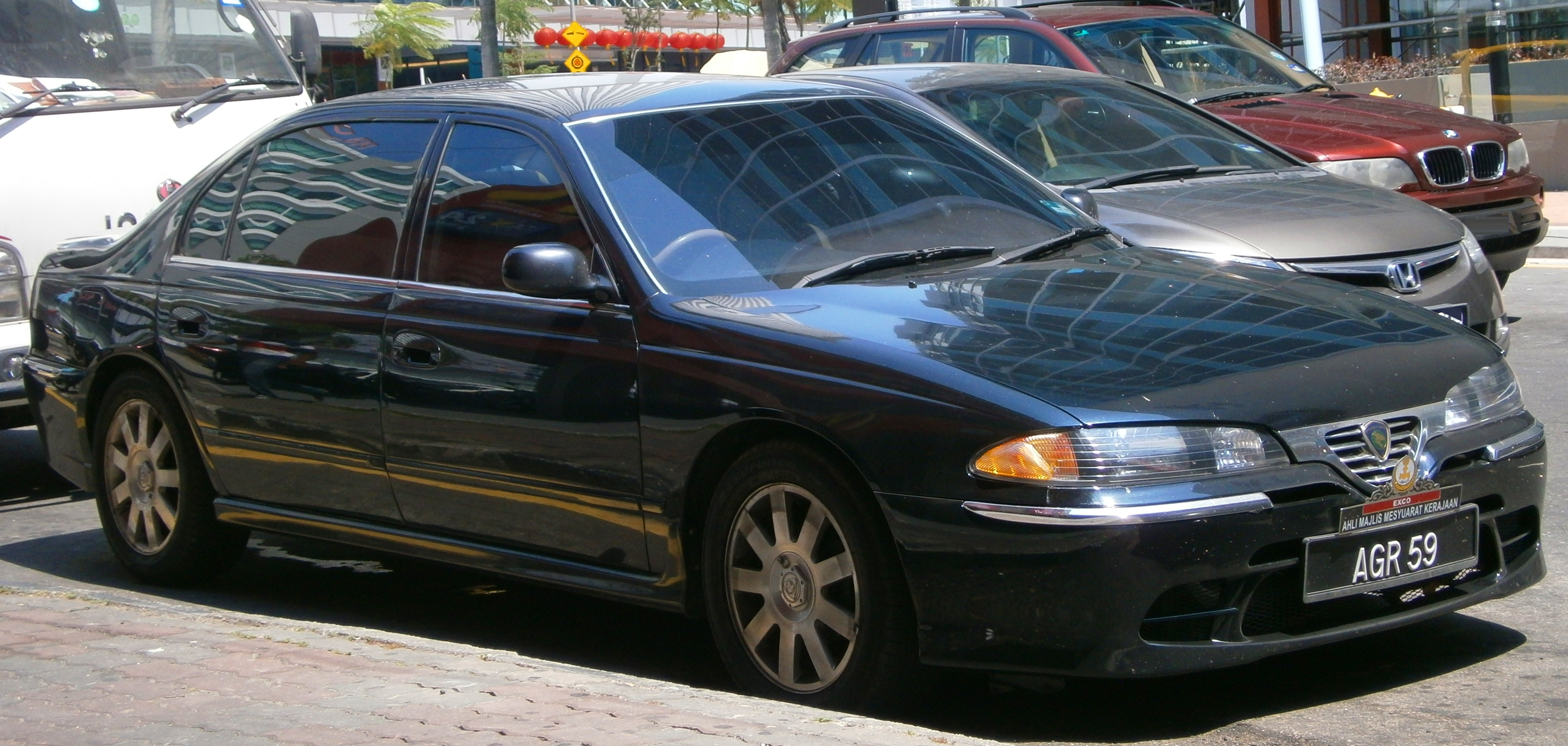
The first generation Proton Perdana, then the company's most premium offering.

On 30 October 1996, Proton acquired an 80% stake in the British company, Lotus Group International Limited, valued at £51 million. The controlling interest was purchased from A.C.B.N. Holdings S.A. of Luxembourg, a company controlled by Italian businessman Romano Artioli, then also the owner of Bugatti. By 2003, Proton's stake in Lotus was increased to 100%. Lotus has been involved in the development of suspension and handling elements of all Proton cars launched since 1996. The commercial success of the Proton Satria GTi, is due in part to Lotus' contributions.

=== 2000s ===
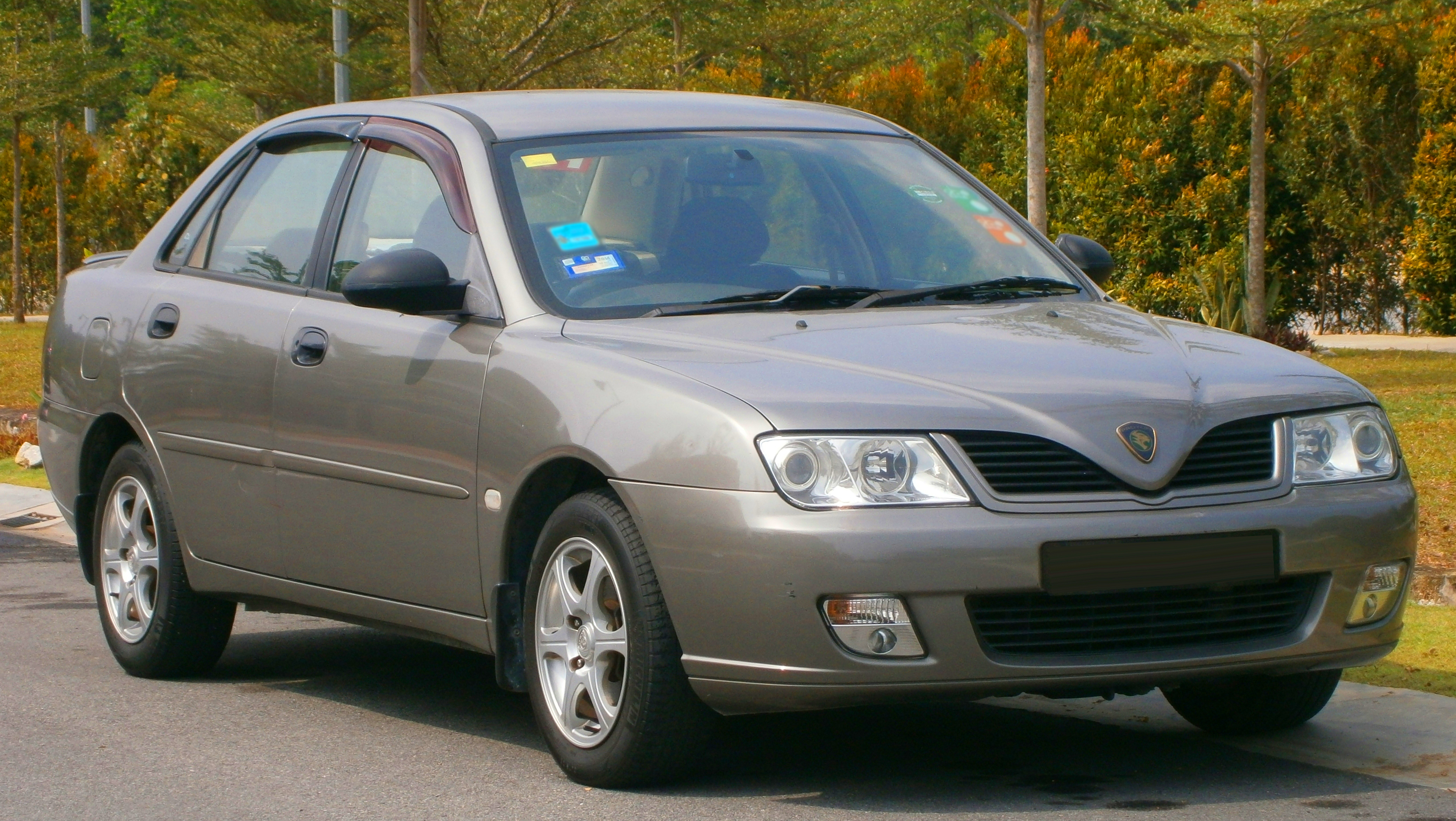
The Proton Waja, the first indigenously designed Proton car.

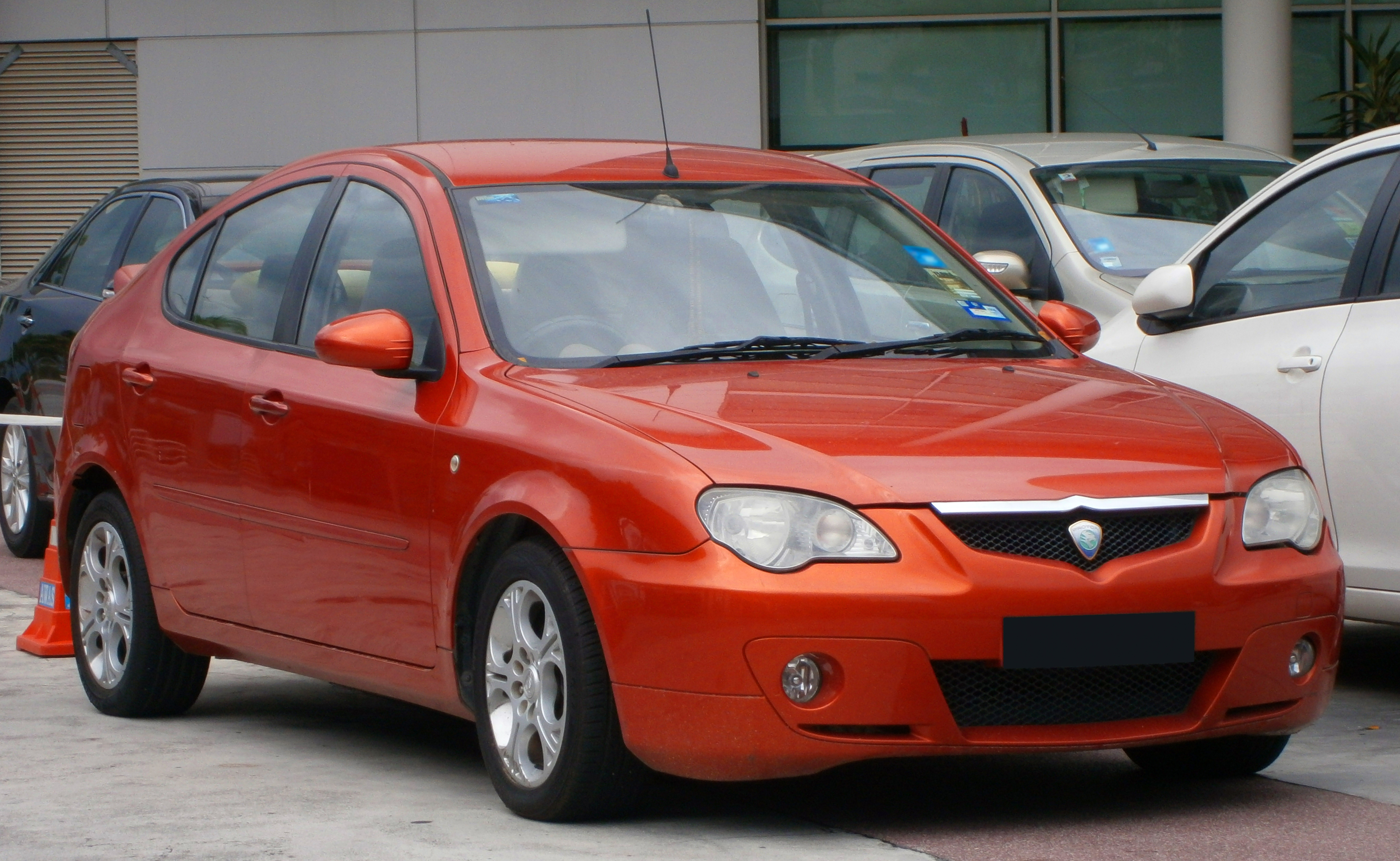
The Proton GEN•2, the first model to be offered with Proton's CamPro engine

The Proton Waja, the company's first indigenously designed model, was launched in August 2000. However, it still had a Mitsubishi 4G18 engine at launch as Proton's first in-house CamPro engine was unavailable. The Waja marked the end of Proton's extensive reliance on other car manufacturers for vehicle platforms and components. However, the model was only a moderate seller, being significantly outsold by Proton's own much older and slightly smaller Proton Wira. The Waja also marked the start of a decline in the local market-leading Proton marque which led to Perodua, the second Malaysian vehicle manufacturer, eventually capturing Proton's sales crown in 2006. In 2002, Proton introduced the Arena, a ute based on the Proton Wira platform and thus far the only Proton model to enjoy significantly more popularity in its export markets (specifically Australia) than domestically. The Proton Gen-2, a hatchback model, was launched in late 2004. It was the first Proton vehicle equipped with the new CamPro engine.

The RM1.8 billion (US$580 million) Proton Tanjung Malim manufacturing plant in the Malaysian state of Perak commenced operation in November 2003. The new plant had been projected to open in August 1998, but it was deferred due to the 1997 Asian financial crisis. However, it was revived in 2001 and completed in late 2003 instead. The new 1,280 acre plant was also developed as part of the Proton City project, which would span 4,000 acres of land in Tanjung Malim and consist of residential, commercial, institutional, industrial and recreational areas. The plant has an annual production capacity of 150,000 vehicles, but could be expanded to 1 million units in the future. The Proton Tanjung Malim plant complements the original Proton plant in operation since 1985, located in Shah Alam, Selangor. Despite a combined production capacity of around 350,000 units, both plants are underutilised with just 52,235 and 114,645 units produced at the Tanjung Malim and Shah Alam plants in 2011 respectively.

In July 2002, Proton announced that a factory in Iran was going operational by next month to manufacture cars from knock-down kits in Borujerd in a partnership with Zagross Khodro.

In July 2004, Proton purchased a 57.57% stake in MV Agusta S.p.A. of Italy, valued at €70 million. Proton sold the marque to Gevi S.p.A. in December 2005 for €1. Gevi assumed the €139.44 million debt carried over from MV Agusta.

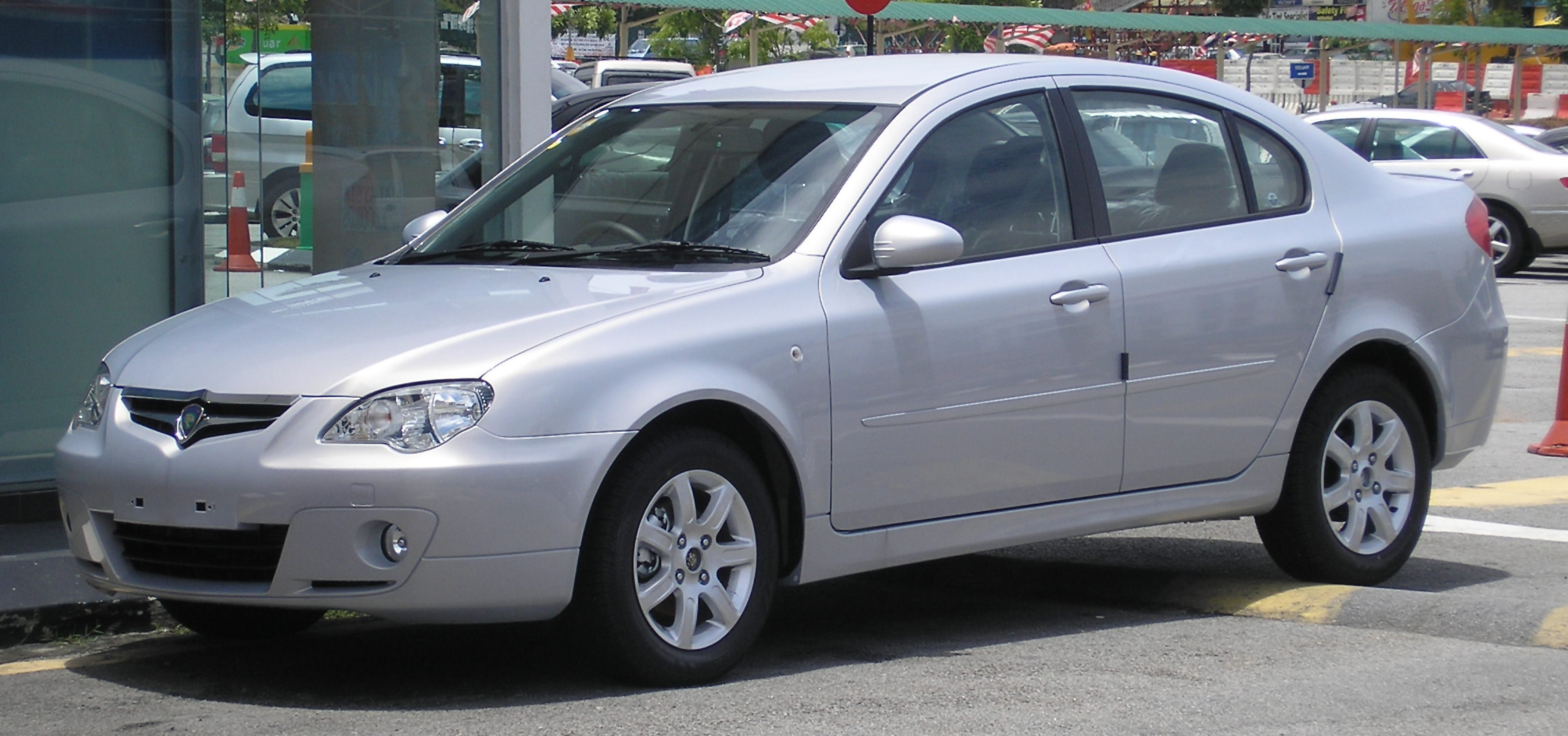
The second generation Proton Persona, the successor to the Proton Wira saloon.

The company's sales grew around 37 percent from 2006 to 2011. The growth was supported by the launch of the Proton Persona in August 2007, the long-overdue replacement for the best-selling but aging Proton Wira saloon. The Persona was designed as an extended version of the 2004 Proton Gen-2 hatchback platform and shared most of its components and external appearance. The Persona sold 19,840 units in the first three months after its launch.

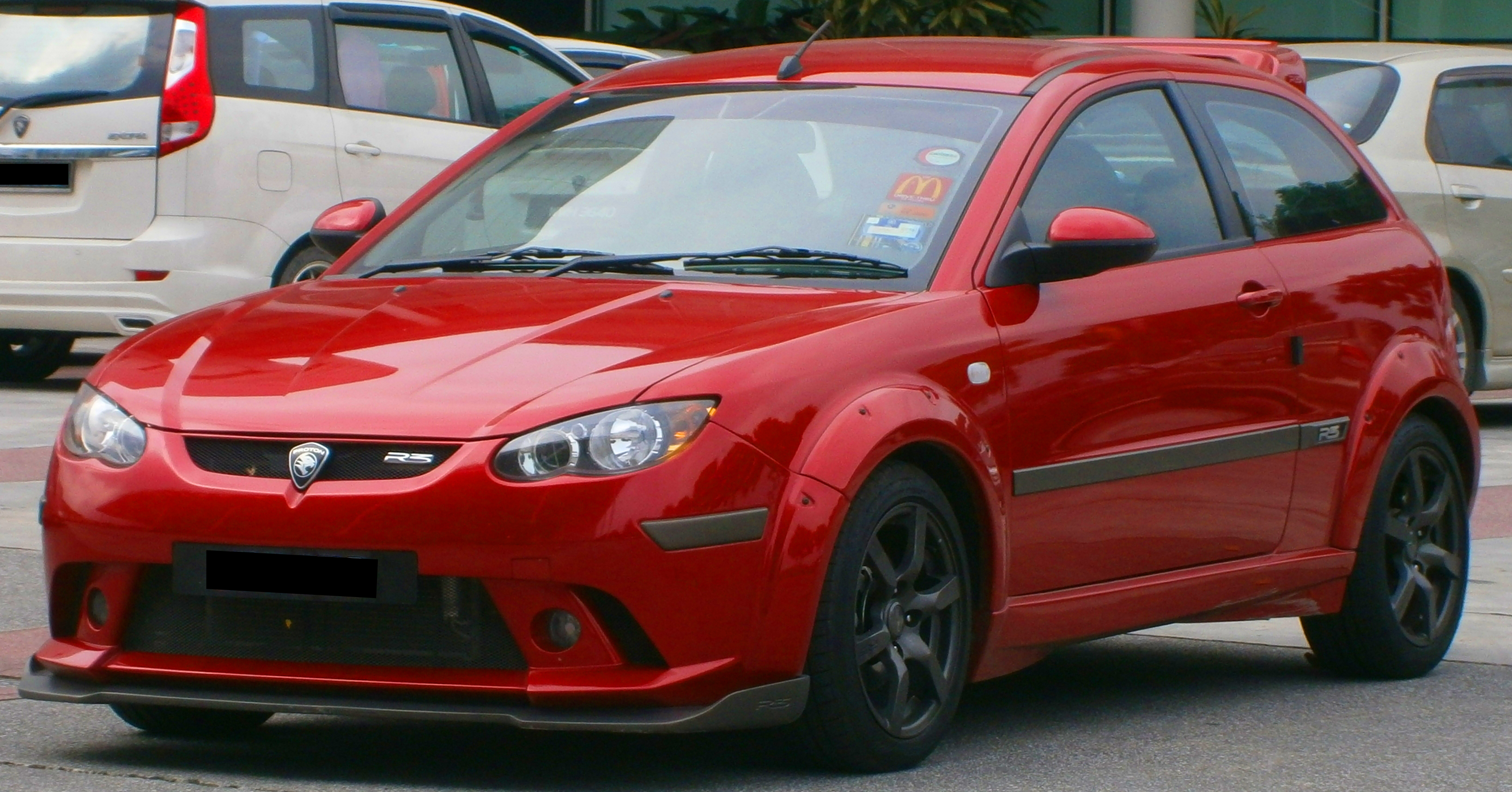
The Proton Satria Neo.

The second generation Proton Saga was launched in January 2008. Previously, the first generation Proton Saga had been Proton's first and most successful model, having had a long 23-year lifespan, the longest of all Proton models to date. The new Saga was booked around 23,000 times across the first two weeks of its launch. It has consistently ranked as Proton's best-selling vehicle domestically, placing 3rd overall in 2008, and 2nd between 2009 and 2012.

In April 2009, Proton introduced the Exora, Malaysia's first indigenous 7-seater MPV. The Exora was intended to compete with the Nissan Grand Livina and the smaller Toyota Avanza. For several years, it consistently positioned in the Top 10 best-selling vehicles in Malaysia.

=== 2010s ===
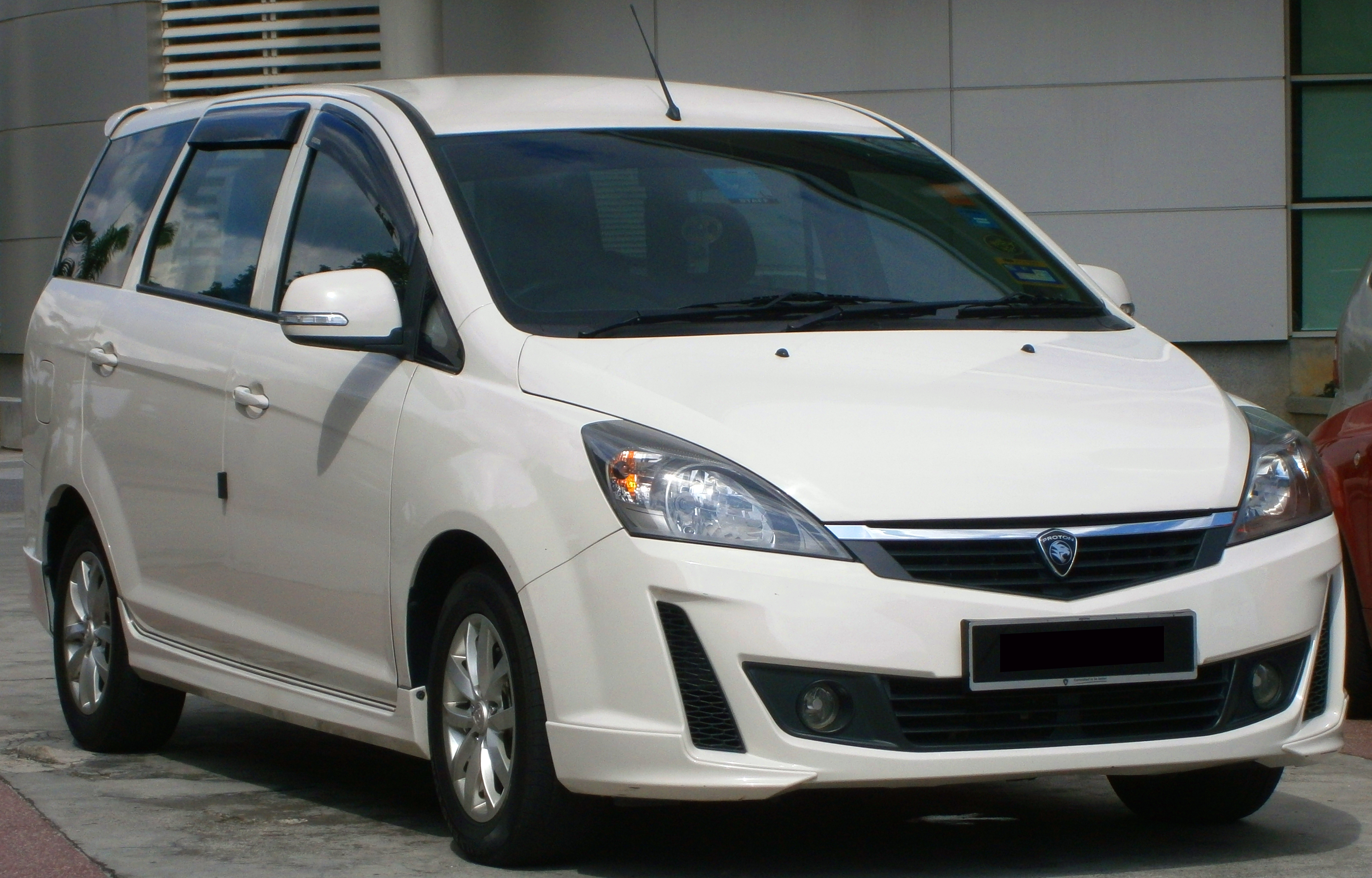
The Proton Exora, the company's first 7-seat MPV.

On 6 August 2008, the Proton Saga and Proton Persona were seen doing road tests at the Greater Noida Expressway, hinting at the potential to export Proton automobiles to India. However, negotiations for Proton to establish an Indian branch did not materialize.

In December 2008, Proton resumed product collaboration with Mitsubishi Motors. Under the agreement, Proton gained the rights to rebadge the 2007 Mitsubishi Lancer to be sold exclusively in the Malaysian market. The result of the collaboration was the Proton Inspira, which launched in November 2010. It also marked a return to closer ties between Proton and Mitsubishi, the Japanese company which was instrumental in Proton's foundation in the 1980s. Proton showcased the EMAS concept hybrid city cars at the 2010 Geneva Motor Show. They were designed by Italdesign Giugiaro and related to the Lotus Ethos, a similar concept car from Proton's British subsidiary.

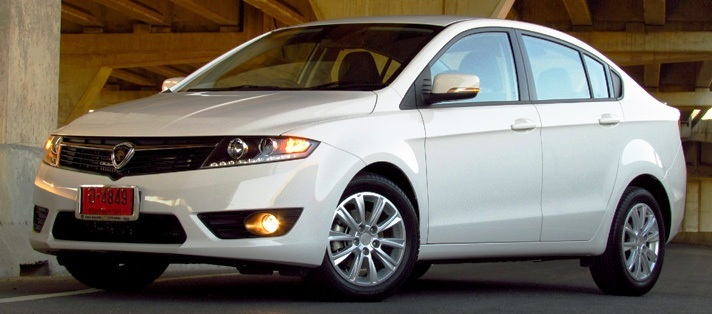
The Proton Prevé, the first 5-star ANCAP safety rated car from Malaysia.

The turbocharged inline-four petrol engine from Proton was revealed at the 2010 Kuala Lumpur International Motor Show. Officially known as the 1.6L CamPro CFE, it is capable of producing power and torque figures of 138 bhp (103 kW) at 5,000 rpm and 205 N·m at 2,000–4,000 rpm respectively, comparable to a 2.0L naturally aspirated engine, while achieving better fuel efficiency and reduced greenhouse emissions.

In January 2012, Proton was acquired by DRB-HICOM, a Malaysian conglomerate in a transaction between Khazanah Nasional and DRB-HICOM which totalled RM1.2 billion. The Proton Prevé, the company's latest saloon car was unveiled on 16 April 2012. It became the first Proton car, and to an extent, the first Malaysian car to be awarded the full 5-star safety rating in the Australasian New Car Assessment Program (ANCAP) of Australia and New Zealand. In December 2012, Proton acquired all of Petronas' E01 engine technologies in addition to associated technology patents at a cost of RM 63 million. The deal encompassed a family of naturally aspirated and turbocharged 1.8, 2.0 and 2.2-litre engines to complement Proton's own CamPro 1.3L N/A, 1.6L N/A and 1.6L turbo engines.

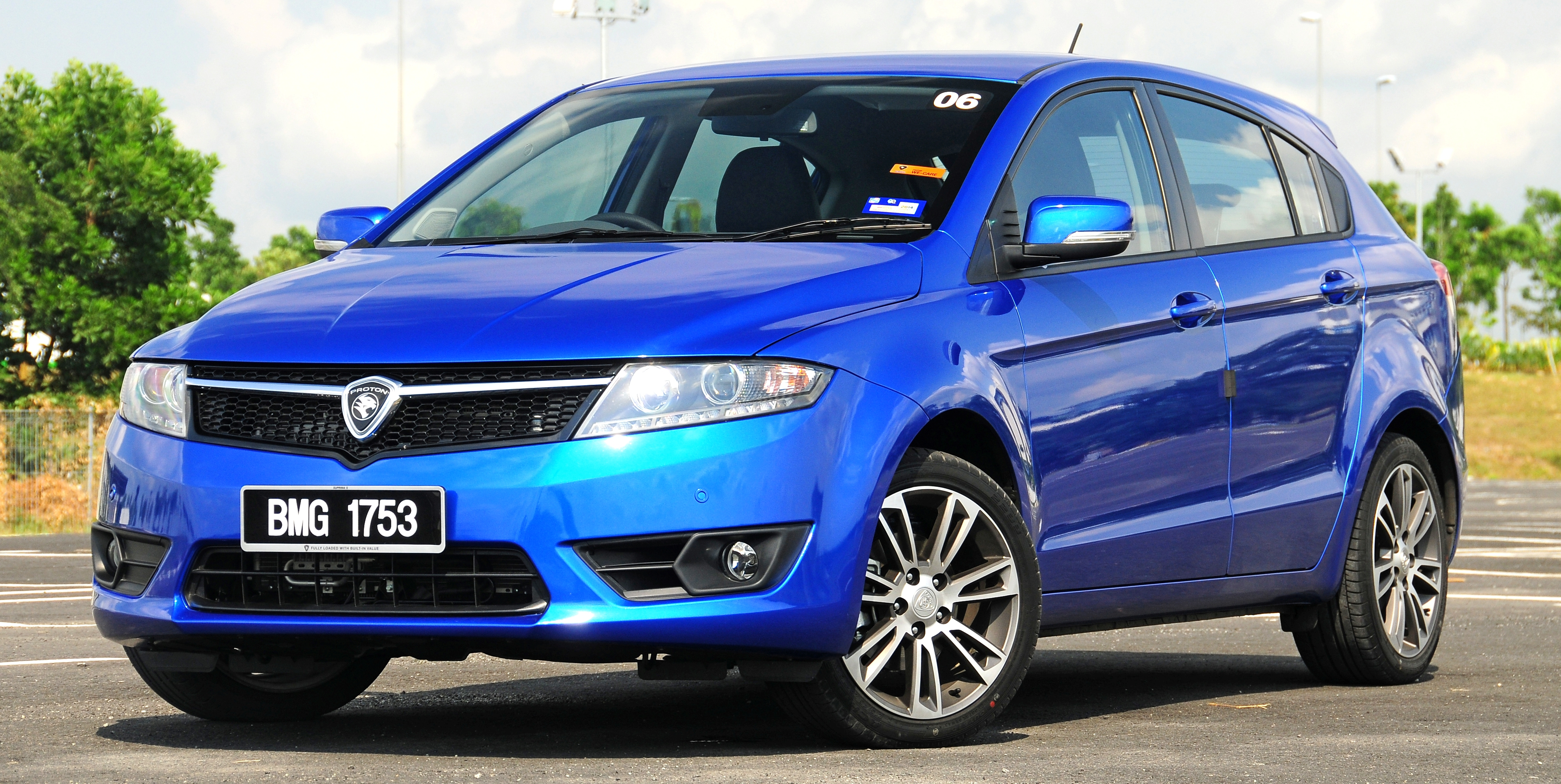
The Proton Suprima S.

In August 2013, Proton launched the Suprima S, the hatchback version of the Prevé saloon. It became the second 5-star ANCAP rated Proton and the first to offer extensive standard safety features in its domestic market. In December 2013, the second generation Proton Perdana was unveiled after a three-year gap in the nameplate's production. The new Perdana is a badge engineered eighth generation Honda Accord and is for exclusive sale to Malaysian civil servants and government officials.

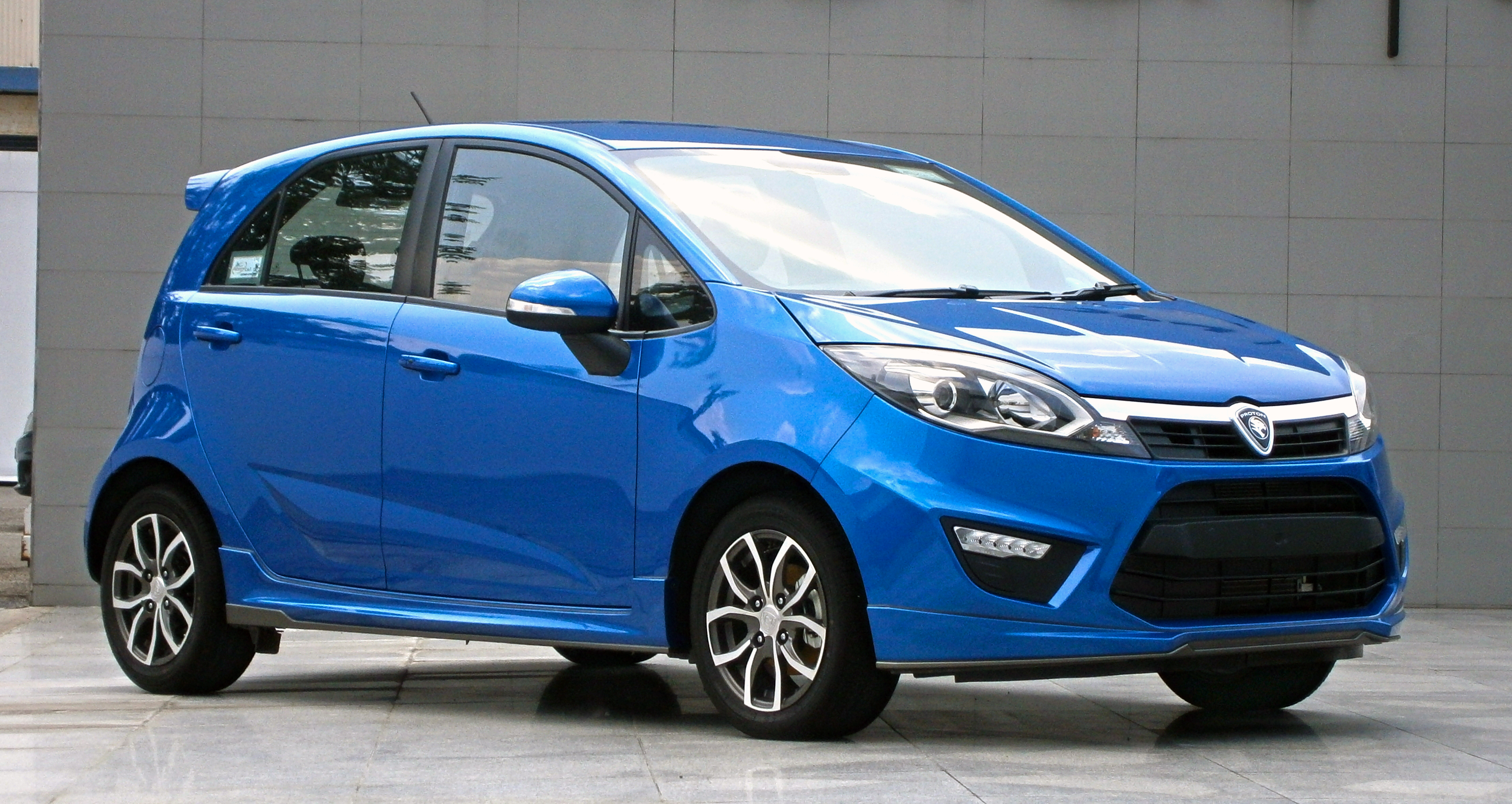
The Proton Iriz.

The Proton Iriz was unveiled in September 2014 as the company's first B-segment 5-door hatchback. The new Iriz competes directly against the Perodua Myvi in its domestic market.

In January 2016, Proton unveiled their all-new four-cylinder GDI/TGDI and three-cylinder VVT engines. The new engines, of which there are six in total, are being developed in collaboration with Ricardo and Lotus Engineering, and are slated to enter production by late 2017.

Proton unveiled their new logo in February 2016, and appointed a new CEO and Deputy CEO in April. The government had also granted Proton a RM 1.5 billion soft loan in mid 2016. The loan came with a number of conditions, including a mandatory tie-up with a foreign automobile company in the near future. Several companies have expressed interest, including Suzuki, Škoda, Groupe PSA, Renault and Geely.

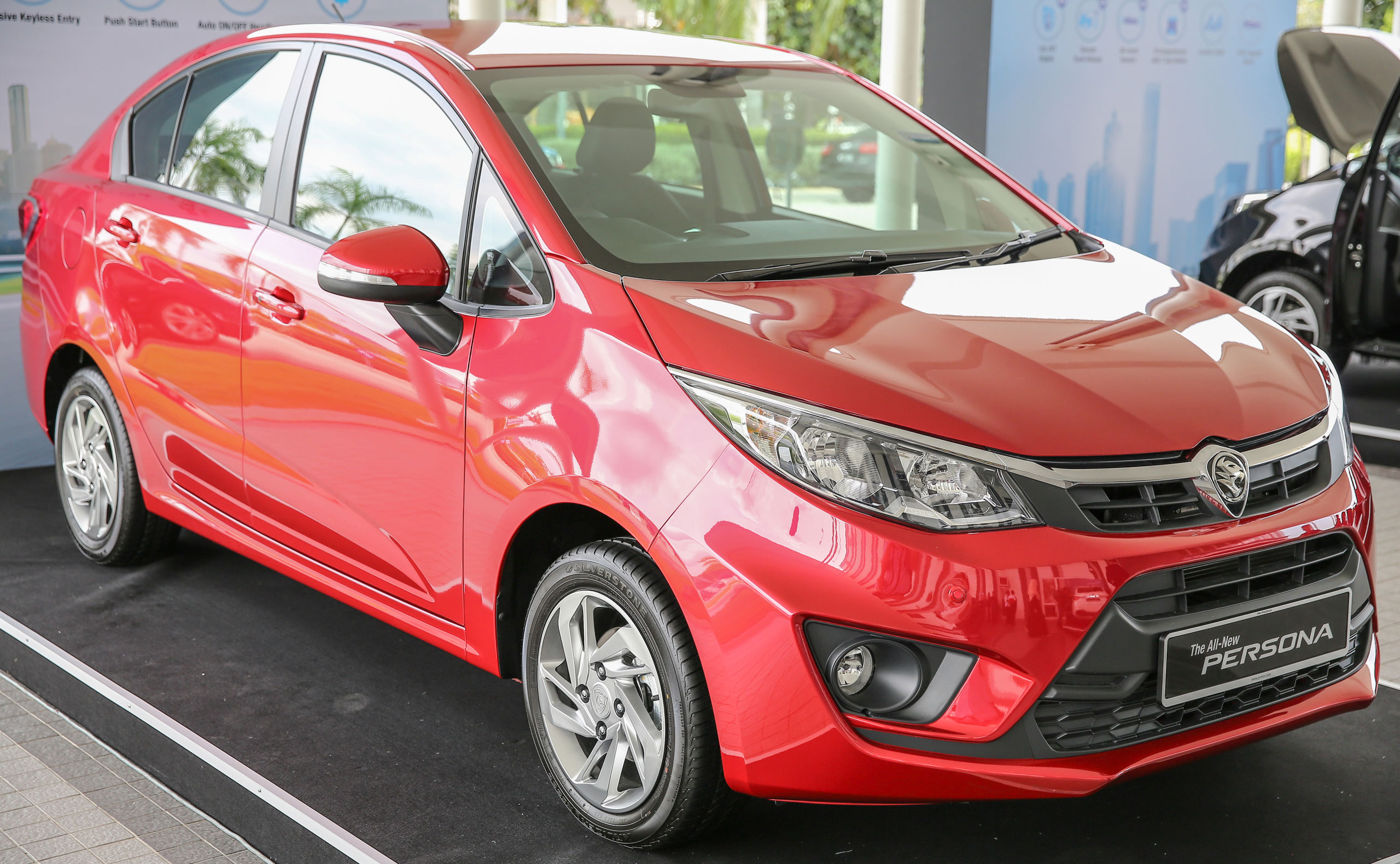
The third generation Proton Persona.

Proton introduced four new models in 2016. The new Perdana launched in June, followed by the new Persona in August, the new Saga in September, and the new Ertiga in November. Masazumi Ogawa was recruited as the director of quality control in Proton.

In May 2017, parent company DRB-HICOM announced plans to sell a 49.9% stake in Proton to Zhejiang Geely Automobile Holdings. Eventually, DRB-HICOM also sold 51% controlling-stake in Lotus to Geely, and the remaining 49% stake to Etika Automotive. The definitive agreement was in July 2017. Proton owned Lotus since 1996, and largely struggled to turn the fortunes of the sports car maker around. Nonetheless, in late 2016, Lotus announced their first operating profit in over 40 years. Their presence in Proton is said to not affect Japanese auto manufacturers due to being in the market for a very long time. Still, many of Proton's cars benefitted from the Lotus relationship, with the Satria GTi specifically mentioned by car reviewers as possessing good handling traits. Subsequent Proton some models received "Lotus Tuned" input.

Proton recruited Yoshiya Inamori as the vice president of manufacturing, who worked with the company in the 1980s.

In September 2017, DRB-HICOM announced changes to the board of Proton Holdings Berhad. Following the signing of a Definitive Agreement with China's Zhejiang Geely Holding Group Limited on 23 June 2017, the Chinese carmaker acquired 49.9% equity in Proton. The announcement in September saw a new board of directors put in place in Proton Holdings, Proton Edar (the local distribution arm) and Perusahaan Otomobil Nasional Sdn Bhd (PONSB).

Three nominees from Geely Holding joined the boards; Daniel Donghui Li, the Executive VP and CFO of Geely Holding; Dr Nathan Yuning, the Executive VP of International Business of Geely Holding, and Feng Qing Feng, the Group VP and CTO at HK-listed Geely Auto. DRB-HICOM are represented by Dato' Sri Syed Faisal Albar, who chairs the boards, and Amalanathan Thomas and Shaharul Farez Hassan. Both are part of the senior management team at DRB-HICOM. On the same day, Dr Li Chunrong joins PONSB as CEO. Dr Li is the third foreigner to head Proton. Between 1993 and 1997, the early years of Proton, two different Japanese nominees of their partners, Mitsubishi Motors Corporation, led the carmaker.

=== 2020s ===
In April 2024, Proton announced the opening of a R&D centre at the Geely Automobile Research Institute at Hangzhou Bay in collaboration with Geely.

That August, Proton announced a partnership with ANSA Motors Limited in Trinidad and Tobago to market and retail their vehicles in the country. In December, Proton launched the e.MAS 7 with Prime Minister Anwar Ibrahim as the main guest of honor.

== Products and technologies ==
=== Current models ===
Current model line up, with calendar year of introduction or most recent facelift:

- Proton Saga (1985–present; A-segment sedan)
- Proton X70 (2018–present; C-segment SUV)
- Proton X50 (2020–present; B-segment SUV)
- Proton X90 (2023–present; D-segment SUV)
- Proton S70 (2023–present; C-segment sedan)
- Proton eMas 7 (2024–present; C-segment electric SUV)
- Proton eMas 7 PHEV (2026–present; C-segment plug-in hybrid SUV)
- Proton eMas 5 (2025–present; B-segment electric hatchback)

=== Former models ===
Former model line up, with calendar year of introduction or most recent facelift:

- Proton Wira (1993–2009; C-segment sedan)
- Proton Persona (1993–2026; B-segment sedan)
- Proton Satria (1994–2005; C-segment hatchback)
- Proton Perdana (1995–2020; D-segment sedan)
- Proton Tiara (1996–2000; A-segment hatchback)
- Proton Putra (1996–2004; C-segment coupe)
- Proton Waja (2000–2011; C-segment sedan)
- Proton Juara (2001–2004; A-segment microvan/MPV)
- Proton Arena (2002–2009; C-segment coupe utility)
- Proton GEN•2 (2004–2012; C-segment hatchback)
- Proton Savvy (2005–2011; A-segment hatchback)
- Proton Satria Neo (2006–2015; B-segment hatchback)
- Proton Exora (2009–2023; C-segment MPV)
- Proton Inspira (2010–2015; C-segment sedan)
- Proton Prevé (2012–2018; C-Segment sedan)
- Proton Suprima S (2013–2019; C-segment hatchback)
- Proton Iriz (2014–2025; B-segment hatchback)
- Proton Ertiga (2016–2019; B-segment mini-MPV)

== Logo and branding ==
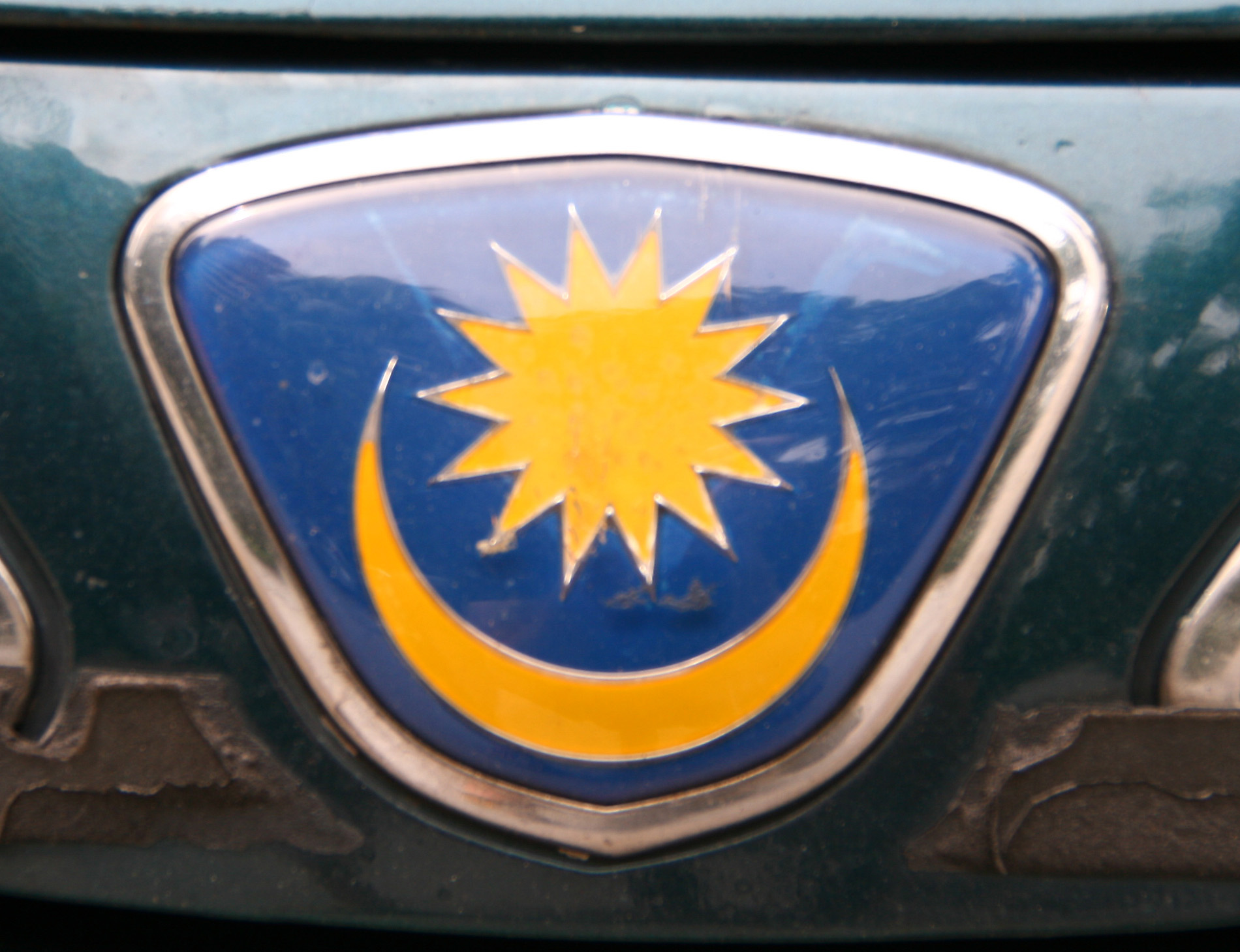
1992–2000 Malaysian market logo.

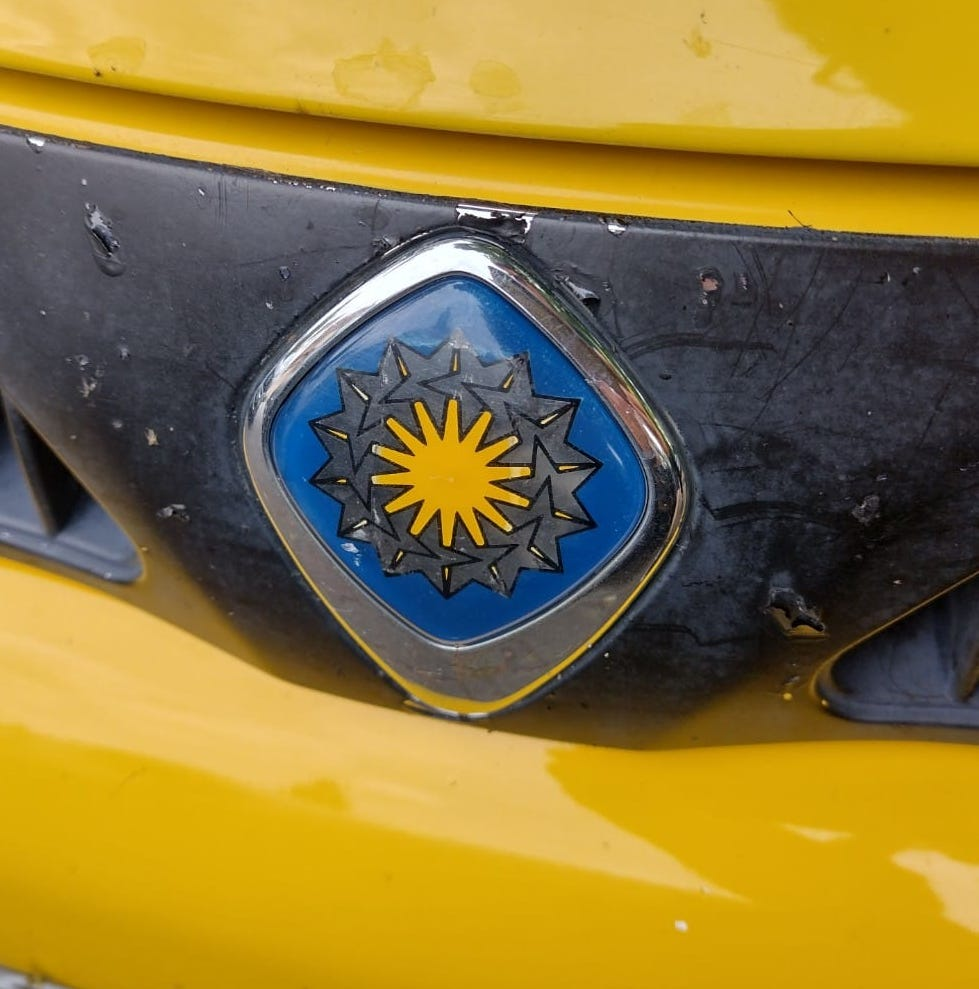
Pre-2000 international logo.

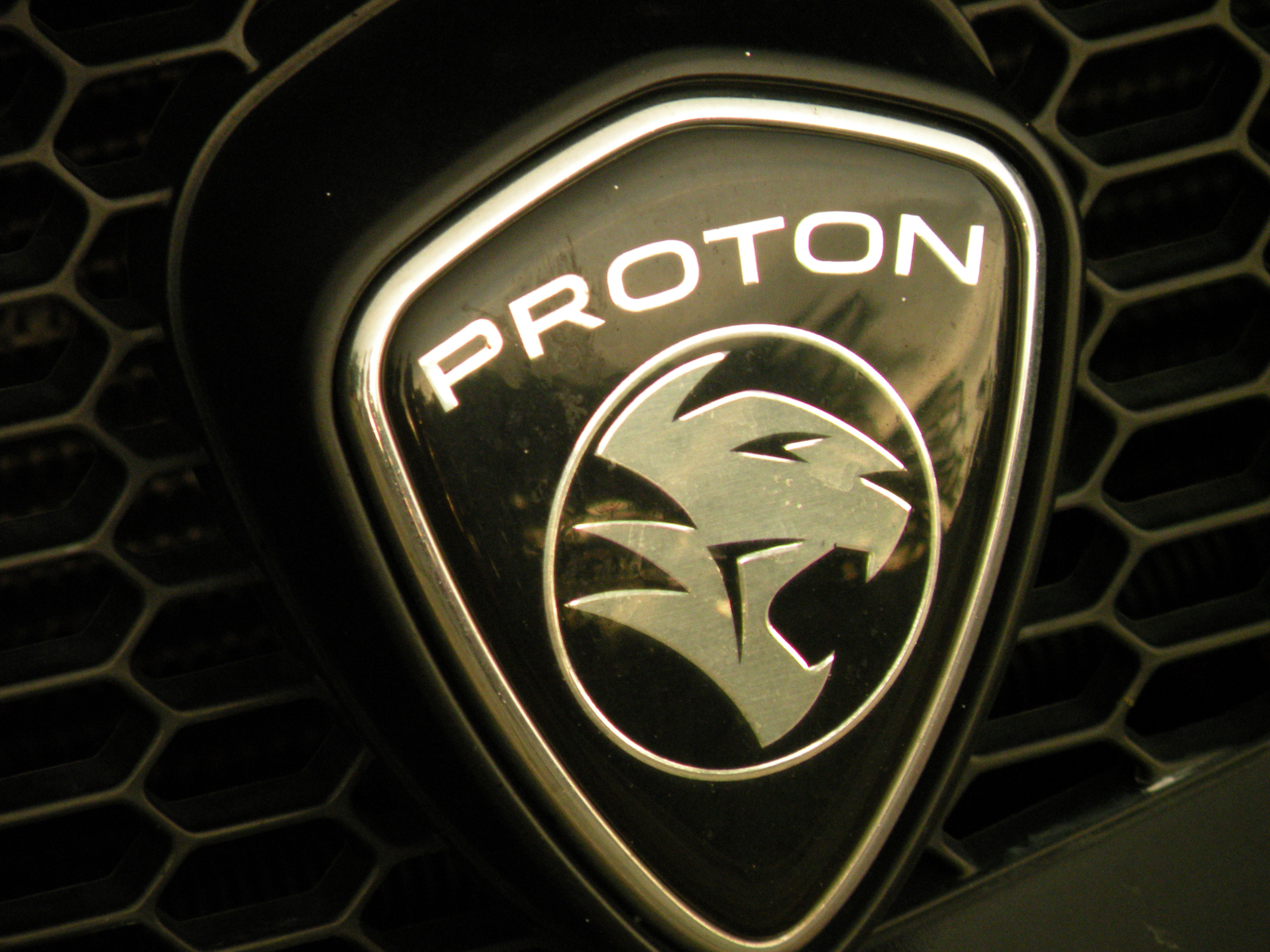
2008–2016 logo.

The Proton logo in 1983 was a dark blue shield which encompassed a yellow crescent positioned below a yellow fourteen-pointed star, in reference to the Malaysian flag and coat of arms. The emblem was only used for Proton cars which were sold domestically. Proton cars exported to other markets received a different badge design of a yellow fourteen-pointed star surrounded by fourteen silver five-pointed stars. In 2000, the new Proton logo was used on the Proton Waja. It featured a stylised yellow tiger head on a green roundel embossed upon a dark blue shield, with the Proton name in yellow capital letters in Frutiger font. The standard text representation of the Proton name was also changed from the lowercase italic text "proton" to the uppercase "PROTON".

All Proton cars manufactured after 2000 carried the new badge, both in the domestic and export markets. Then its colour was changed into two-tone, silver and black, which was in use since 2008 with the introduction of the second generation Proton Saga.

In June 2016, a new Proton logo was introduced during the launch of 2016 Proton Perdana, which is only a Malayan tiger head with a circle surrounding in three-dimensional style. The new logo is now used on all Proton latest models, including the 2017 Proton Iriz facelift and 2017 Proton Exora Enhanced.

Two years after (i.e., September 2019) Proton's global strategic partnership with Geely in 2017, Proton Holdings unveiled a brand new logo and ‘Inspiring Connections’ tagline to outline its ambition to be a global, modern automotive brand. Starting with the Proton X70, and excluding the 2019 Exora, the rear badge was replaced by lettering spelling out 'Proton'.

== Corporate leadership ==
=== Chairmen ===
- Mahathir Mohamad (1983–2012 and 2014–2016)
- Tan Sri Dato' Sri Haji Mohd Khamil Jamil (2012–2014)
- Dato' Sri Syed Faisal Albar (2016–present)

=== Chief Executive Officers/CEOs ===
- Kenji Iwabuchi (1988–1993)
- Yahaya Ahmad (1994–1996)
- Tengku Tan Sri Dr. Mahaleel Tengku Ariff (1997–2005)
- Syed Zainal Abidin Syed Mohamed Tahir (2006–2012)
- Ahmad Fuaad (2016–2017)
- Dr. Li Chunrong (2017–present)

== Overseas operations ==
As of 2025, Proton has an overseas presence in Bangladesh, Myanmar, Brunei, Egypt, Fiji, Iraq, Jordan, Kenya, Mauritius, Mozambique, Nepal, Pakistan, Papua New Guinea, Singapore, Sri Lanka, South Africa, Trinidad and Tobago and Zimbabwe.

CKD plants are located in Pakistan, Kenya, Nepal and Sri Lanka.

== Sales ==
=== Domestic ===
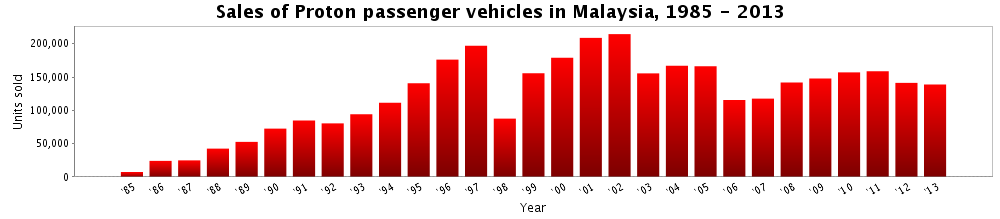
Proton's sales grew at a stable rate in the first decade, but plunged in 1998 due to the 1997 Asian financial crisis. Nonetheless, Proton bounced back and recorded its highest sales volume in 2002 at 214,373 units. Sales gradually decreased in the following five years due to cheaper and more competitive offerings from Perodua. Proton's sales have recovered slightly since 2008, but their market share is in a current state of decline. Proton has sold over 3,500,000 cars in Malaysia between 1985 and 2013.

The first Proton, the Saga saloon launched in July 1985 amid positive reception, but poor sales due to Proton's inability to meet the high demand. However, Proton later captured a 47% Malaysian market share in the following year, with 24,148 cars sold. The company's market share later grew to 65% in 1987; 85% in the Under 1,600cc segment. Proton maintained a majority market share in the following years, which peaked in 1993 at 74% with over 94,100 units sold. Car sales in Malaysia plunged from 404,000 units in 1997 to 163,851 in 1998 due to the 1997 Asian financial crisis. Proton's revenue and profits were severely affected, but a majority market share was still maintained into the early 2000s.

In the mid-2000s, Proton's revenues and sales declined. In 2006, Proton's market share was 32%, down from 40% in 2005. Proton lost its majority domestic market share for the first time in 20 years to Perodua, the second Malaysian car manufacturer.

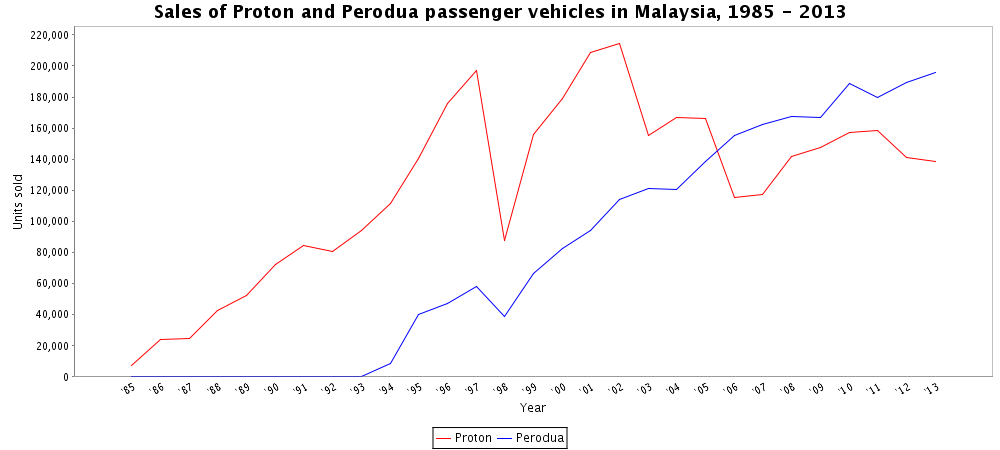
A comparison of Proton & Perodua sales in the domestic market. Perodua, which started out in 1994 as a complement and not a competitor to Proton has overtaken the latter to become Malaysia's best selling car manufacturer. Perodua cars manage to sell in greater numbers due to their cheaper pricing range, in which there are few competitors, as well as their inheritance of generally better designs from their parent company, Toyota.

Sales of Proton cars increased in the latter half of the 2000s and in the early 2010s. The company briefly regained the top-spot from Perodua in June 2009, after the introduction of the Proton Exora MPV. Proton also matched Perodua's market share in the first quarter of 2011. Around the same time, the company was under the direction of Syed Zainal Abidin. However, despite the improvements made between 2007 and 2012 in addition to improved overall sales, Proton's Malaysian market share continued to decrease. In 2011, the company had a 26.4% (158,657 units) share which plummeted further to 22.5% (141,121 units) in 2012. In comparison, Perodua retained a majority market share of 30.1% (189,137 units) in 2012, with Toyota maintaining its third place at a 16.8% share with 105,151 units sold.

Proton's decline in market share stabilised in 2013. In the first half of that year, Proton sold 64,782 cars, representing 20.7% of the market share, a decline of 1.8% over its full-year 2012 share. However, by the end of 2013, Proton had managed to raise its market share to 21.2% with a total of 138,753 units sold. Nonetheless, Proton's market share has still declined by an overall 1.3% between 2012 and 2013. In July 2013, Proton sold around 16,600 cars, which accounted for 25% in market share during that specific month, the company's highest ever in 2013. Perodua on the other hand sold around 19,200 or 2,600 more cars than Proton in July 2013. The rise in Proton's sales were attributed to the launch of the Proton Saga SV, a cheaper variant of the second best-selling car in Malaysia.

Another factor which continues to play a significant role in the sales of Proton cars is the National Automotive Policy (NAP), enforced by the Malaysian government in the interests of Proton, Perodua, Naza and foreign brands with manufacturing plants in Malaysia. Under the NAP, imported vehicles are subjected to varying degrees of import and excise duties depending on the vehicle's origin of manufacture and engine displacement, with excise duty imposed at 60 to 105 percent being the highest component in the duty structure. Vehicles imported from members of the Association of South East Asian Nations, such as Thailand and Indonesia, are subject to the least import duties, whereas those from Europe suffer the worst. However, imported hybrid vehicles and cars purchased in duty-free Langkawi are exempted from the import and excise duties. The NAP ensures the survival of Proton and other Malaysian-made vehicles under a biased playing field in the Malaysian market. Nonetheless, the import duties of the NAP have been progressively revised and reduced in line with the eventual liberation of the market, but excise duties, the larger component of tariffs, continues to be high and opaquely applied, with non-tariff barriers effectively reducing the rate for Malaysian made vehicles.

In March 2013, the Ministry of International Trade and Industry (Malaysia) announced that vehicles manufactured in Australia and Japan will face a gradual reduction of import duties in stages to zero by 2016. Proton however responded positively to the announcement, citing their recent positive developments such as the 5-star ANCAP safety recognition of the Proton Prevé as part of its commitment to progress.

=== Export ===
Proton relies primarily on its domestic market for the majority of its sales and revenues. Nonetheless, small volumes of Proton cars are also exported to various other countries in Asia, in addition to the United Kingdom and Australia. The company held a far larger global sales network in the 1990s, spanning all six continents and over 70 countries, but intends to regain a global foothold with 500,000 annual sales by 2018.

On 24 January 2020, Proton announced that their goal is to export 4,000 vehicles by the end of the year or export 6,000 vehicles if they were offered government incentives.

=== History ===
Proton cumulative sales volume in selected markets
Country	Cars sold	Time frame	References
Malaysia	≈ 3,760,000	07 / 1985–present	
United Kingdom	141,209	03 / 1989–2016	
Australia	34,985	05 / 1995–2016	
Singapore	23,951	10 / 1989–2002; 2003 – 2012	
Thailand	19,188	12 / 2007–2016	
Germany	15,479	03 / 1995–09 / 1999	
Syria	around 15,000	2001–present	
Egypt	around 13,000	2000–12 / 2015 and 2018–present	
South Africa	around 5,000	2004–2015; 2022–present	
Chile	around 3,500	1994–1998 and 2016–2018	
Indonesia	around 580	2002–2018	
Pakistan	N/A	2006–2010 and 2019–present	

Proton first ventured into export markets in December 1986, a year and a half after the launch of the company's first car, the Saga. It was only sold in right-hand drive markets like New Zealand, the United Kingdom and Singapore because left-hand drive variants were not produced. Proton attempted to enter the American market in November 1988, but failed to meet strict US automotive regulations. However, the Proton Wira, which launched in 1993 became the company's first car to be produced in both left and right-hand drive configurations, paving the way for Proton's entry into Continental Europe in October 1994 and other markets in the Middle East and Latin America. The company's global sales network peaked between 1994 and the early 2000s, but has since dwindled to around 25 countries as of the 2010s. Proton has commissioned CKD plants in Iran, Indonesia, the Philippines, Vietnam, and China.

Proton began importing cars to the right-hand drive UK market from March 1989, and reached its 12-month sales target of 5,000 cars after just six months. The Proton brand was initially a huge success in the UK, but sales were declining sharply by 2010 and the brand was withdrawn in 2014.

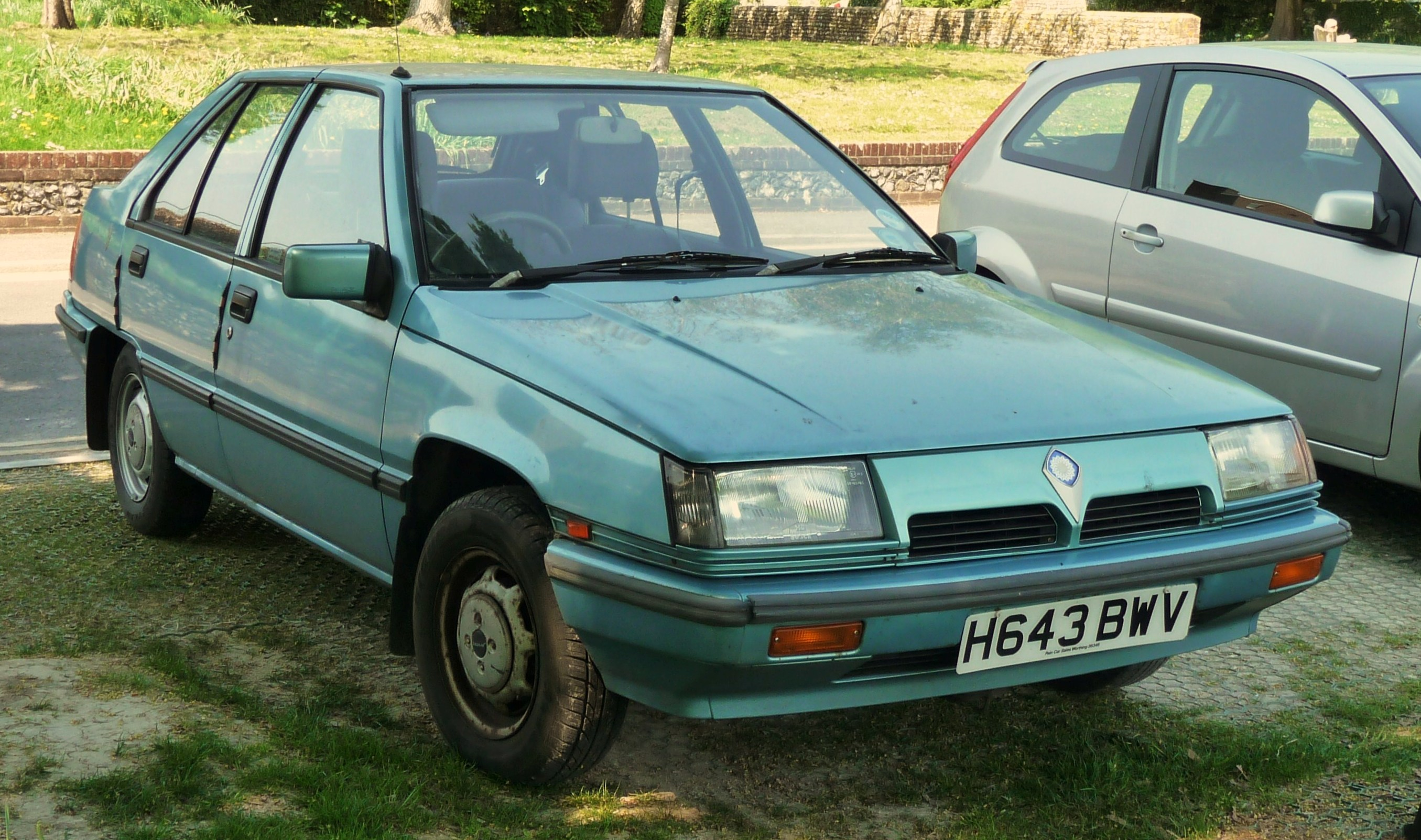
The Proton Saga 1.5GL Aeroback. Over 30,000 Protons were sold in the United Kingdom within its first 3 years. At its peak in 1992, one Proton was sold in Britain for every five sold in Malaysia.

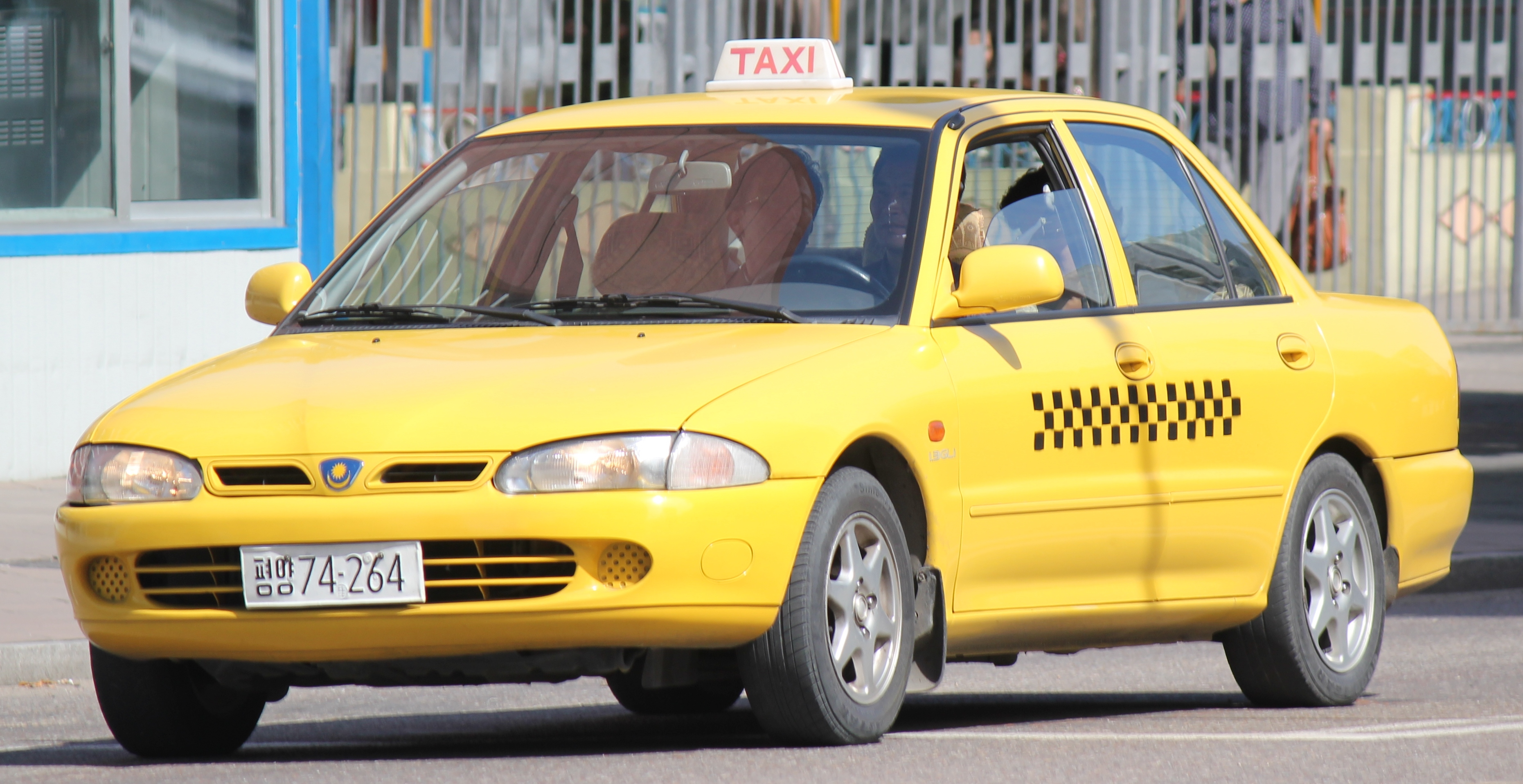
A Proton Wira taxi in Pyongyang, North Korea. Proton cars have also been exported as diplomatic gifts to several countries and governments.

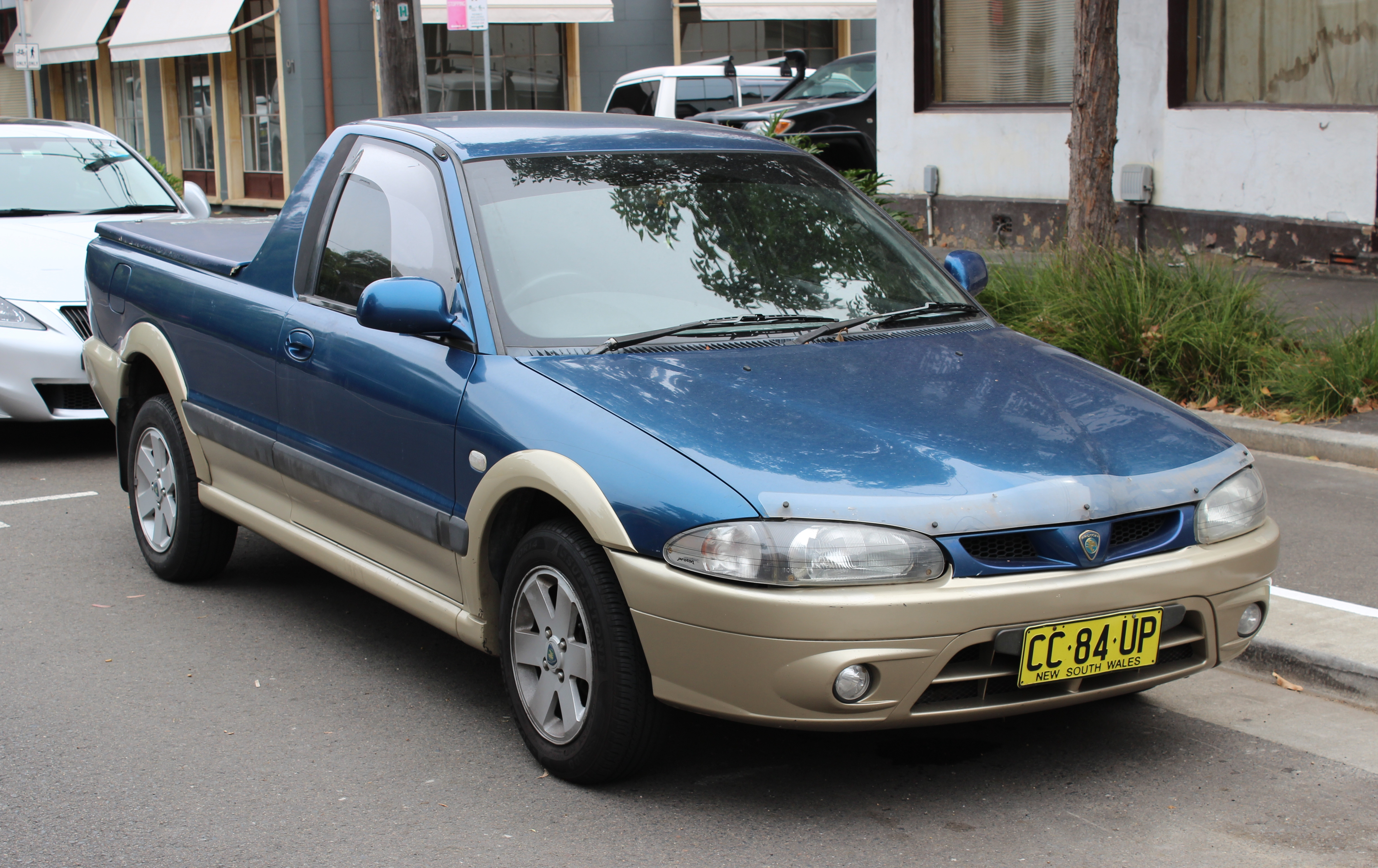
The Proton Jumbuck ute. It is the only Proton model of which export demand exceeded domestic demand.

Proton's presence in Singapore was handled by Cycle & Carriage from 1989 to September 2002 due to failures to make a turn around. It made a comeback in 2003 with Proton establishing a direct branch.

In the Philippines, Proton was formerly represented by Proton Pilipinas Corp from 1992 with an assembly plant in Alaminos, Pangasinan that manufactured the Proton Wira.

Proton exported 164,153 cars between December 1986 and December 1997. The United Kingdom is by far the company's most successful export market in terms of cumulative sales volume, and at one point Proton set the record for Fastest Selling Make of New Car Ever to Enter the United Kingdom. In 1992, the Saga was ranked among the Top 20 best-selling cars in the UK, outselling its primary competitors from Hyundai and SEAT. 100,000 Protons were sold in the UK by 1997.

Additionally, a 1999 survey by the United Kingdom Consumers' Association ranked Proton as among the most reliable and recommended in Britain. The response from 27,000 members of the association revealed that Proton was ranked third in terms of fewer breakdowns, faults and other mechanical problems, placing Proton behind Honda and Mazda, and ahead of Toyota and Ford. Furthermore, 80% of the surveyed Consumers' Association members said they would recommend Proton cars to friends and family, compared to 90% for Subaru, 79% for Toyota, 78% for Honda and Mitsubishi, 63% for Hyundai and 47% for Rover respectively. The 1999 award is Proton's second consecutive, having received similar appraisal in 1998.

However, sales in the UK have since collapsed, with just 208 Protons sold in 2012. Proton cars were once popular in Singapore, at one time the company's second-largest export destination despite its relatively small market size. Sales were also modest in Germany and Belgium during the late 90s, prior to Proton's withdrawal from Continental Europe. Kuwait was once a top Middle Eastern export destination for Proton cars in the late 90s and early 2000s, with an average market share of 8% or 1,000 units sold each year, ten times greater than any other Gulf Cooperation Council state. The Kuwaiti dealer, Bahrah Trading Company had focused on the niche fleet market, selling Proton Wiras to fast food delivery services and taxi operators.

By the first half of the 2010s, the Chinese market had become the largest contributor to Proton's export revenues. Although Proton cars sold in China carried different names and badges under the local Youngman EuropeStar brand, Proton nonetheless received royalties for the use of their platforms and Campro engines. Proton's six-year contract with Youngman expired in 2012, but the Zhejiang-based company continued to unofficially produce Proton's cars and engines up until early 2015. In February 2015, Proton announced that they would revive their joint venture with Fujian-based Goldstar, and would not renew their contract with Youngman.

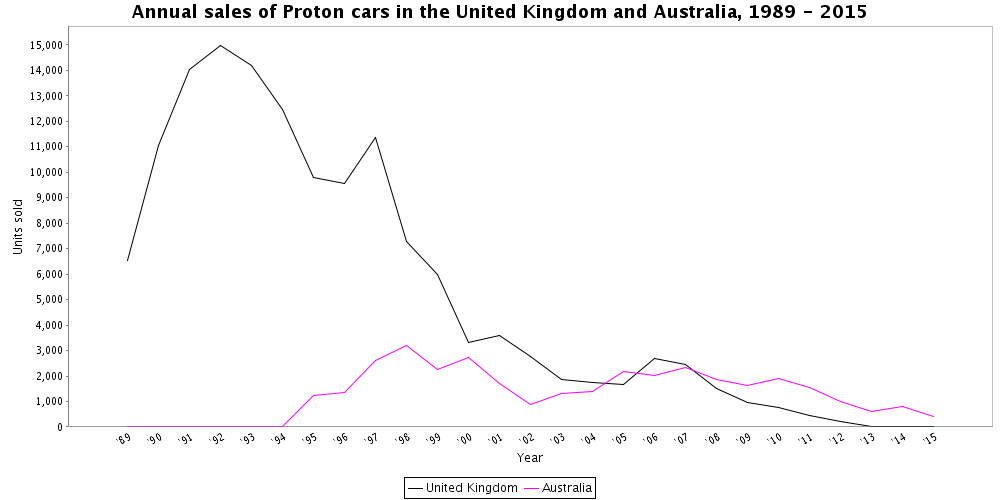
Proton cars were first exported to the United Kingdom in 1989, and later Australia in 1995. British Proton sales peaked at 14,957 units in 1992, above rivals such as Hyundai (9,337), Kia (3,519), Škoda (9,365), SEAT (8,198), Lada (11,907) and even Mitsubishi (11,077). Proton's best performance in Australia was in 1998, with 3,182 units sold. Since the late 90s, sales in the U.K have decreased significantly.

Proton cars were also exported to several countries in Latin America, most notably Chile. Exports to Chile commenced in 1994, and almost 3,000 Protons were sold prior to the company's departure in 1998. However, Proton later expressed intentions of returning to Chile following the ratification of the Malaysia-Chile Free Trade Agreement in 2012. In July 2015, Proton signed a distributor agreement with Andes Motor, and the first official shipment of 50 left-hand drive Prevé units commenced on 1 March 2016. The Chilean launch of the Proton Prevé took place in May 2016, and formally marked Proton's return to Chile after an 18-year absence. It was reported that Proton left Chile by 2019 with 128 vehicle sold.

Proton announced that they closed Proton Motor Pars, established in August 2011, since it was dormant and no longer in the company's interest to revive it in any way.

On 12 July 2018, Proton resumes exports to the Middle East beginning with 440 units of Proton Gen•2 and 15 units of first-generation Proton Persona in Jordan to be distributed to Iraq as well as neighboring countries.

Proton had also entered Pakistan market in 2006 with a local automotive importing company named Royal Automobiles (Pvt) Ltd. Pakistan, the line-up from Proton Pakistan were the Proton Saga, Wira, Waja, Gen 2 and the Proton Impian, but unfortunate sale volume due to tough competition from veteran competitor brands and used imported cars in the market had to force them for early departure in 2010. On 21 March 2019, Proton had announced their plans that they will re-enter Pakistan after their departure in 2010 with a new plant be built in Pakistan in collaboration with Alhaj Automotive. Proton has already booked CBU versions of Proton X70 in Pakistan. The orders for CKD versions of X70 are also being booked by Proton in Pakistan which are expected to be delivered in Q3 of 2021 after the completion of the local assembly plant there. The Proton Saga is also expected to re-launch after 2006 in Pakistan in January 2021.

On 21 August 2020, it was announced that the Proton Saga will be exported to Kenya, most built under CKDs shipped to Simba Corp.

It was announced on 13 November 2020 that Proton vehicles will be sold in Nepal by Jagadamba Motors. The company will formally launch retail operations by January 2021. Proton previously had a presence in Nepal.

On 28 April 2022, an agreement was signed for Proton to re-enter the South African auto market. On 31 May 2022, Proton announced shipments of Proton X50s, X70s and Sagas in an effort to resume a presence in South Africa with CMH Group as the official distributor. In 2015, Proton left South Africa due to bad market conditions.

Proton announced in May 2023 that they have entered Mozambique in partnership with local automobile distributor Entreposto. In March 2024, Proton has a partnership with ANSA Motors to market/distribute Proton vehicles in Trinidad & Tobago with the X50 and X90 being marketed.

On 13 November 2024, Proton announced the opening of a CKD plant in Egypt owned by Ezz Elarab Elsewedy Automotive Factories (ESAF), the third one overseas after Kenya and Pakistan.

=== Future ===
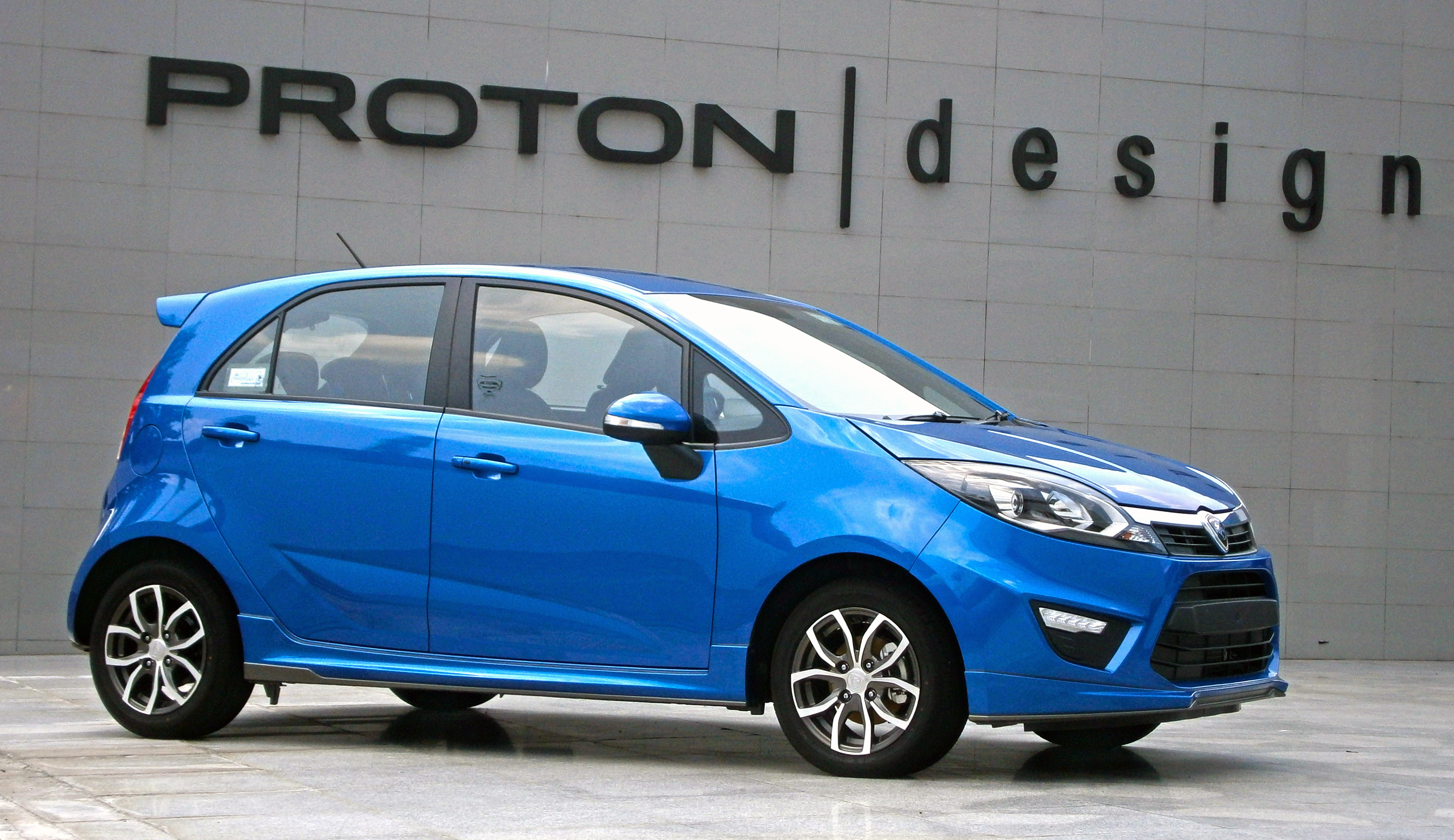
The Proton Iriz may receive a new 1.3-litre turbo, 6MT option in the near future. A fully electric Iriz EV was also studied.

The United Kingdom has been a key export market for Proton since the late 1980s. However, by the late 2000s, British Proton sales had declined considerably as a result of ageing models and depleting stock. In 2013, Proton Cars UK had attempted to relaunch the brand with four all-new models. However, the relaunch was instead postponed indefinitely in view of more stringent European Union emissions and safety regulations. It was announced on 7 August 2024 that Proton wil return to the UK "later this decade". This plan was also mentioned again, alongside a planned return to Australia and New Zealand. Proton was formerly seen in New Zealand in the 1980s.

Proton is currently developing a range of all-new petrol engines in collaboration with Ricardo and Lotus Engineering. The engines will feature more advanced technology such as direct injection, cylinder deactivation and stop-start idling, and will meet the highest Euro 6c emissions regulations. On 18 January 2016, Proton fired up a prototype in a live broadcast from Ricardo's facility in Shoreham, England. Mass production of the all-new Proton engines will commence in late 2017.

Additionally, Proton has announced their partnership with LG Electronics in the development of autonomous safety technology. In September 2014, Proton previewed an Iriz prototype with LG's Advanced Drive Assistance System (ADAS). With the LG ADAS implementation, new autonomous safety features like Autonomous Emergency Braking (AEB), Forward Collision Warning (FCW), Adaptive Cruise Control (ACC), Cross Traffic Assist (CTA), Lane Departure Warning (LDW), Traffic Sign Recognition (TSR) and High Beam Assist (HBA) can be incorporated into Proton's future offerings. The inclusion of autonomous safety features has become a necessary prerequisite for a full 5-Star Euro NCAP and ANCAP rating.

On 3 December 2014, Proton announced plans to construct a new car factory in Bangladesh. A deal was made public on 6 February 2015 between Kuala Lumpur and Jakarta to help the latter develop the way for their own national car. There are allegations that President Jokowi Widodo is appointing Abdullah Mahmud Hendropriyono as the representative of PT Adiperkasa Citra Lestari, who was known to be associated with ex-President Megawati Soekarnoputri.

According to Steven Xu of Proton's International Sales, the company is still in the process of establishing more distributors to increase its presence in Indonesia as of 10 April 2019.

On 24 April 2019, Proton announced that they'll relaunch again in Australia since sales have declined in 2015 after the company established its presence in 1995.

According to Li Churong, the company will expand its presence in the ASEAN countries, such as Brunei, Indonesia, Singapore and Thailand. The company announced on 16 June 2021 that its Indonesian and Thai operations will resume in the near future with plans to be the third biggest automobile manufacturer in the ASEAN region. It was reported that Proton's Thai operations could resume by 2022. But in February 2023, it's reported that Indonesian and Thai operations have yet to resume, including Fiji.

The presence of a Proton X50 being driven in India for road tests indicate the possible presence of a future Proton branch in India.

On 29 November 2024, Geely announced that they will enter the Australian and Thai auto markets, potentially putting any dampers for Proton to market their vehicles in those two countries. On 17 December 2024, Proton announced that Vincar Group will be the Singaporean distributor/retailer for Proton vehicles in Singapore with the Proton e.MAS 7 being the first vehicle to be retailed in 2025.

== Partnerships ==
=== Mitsubishi ===
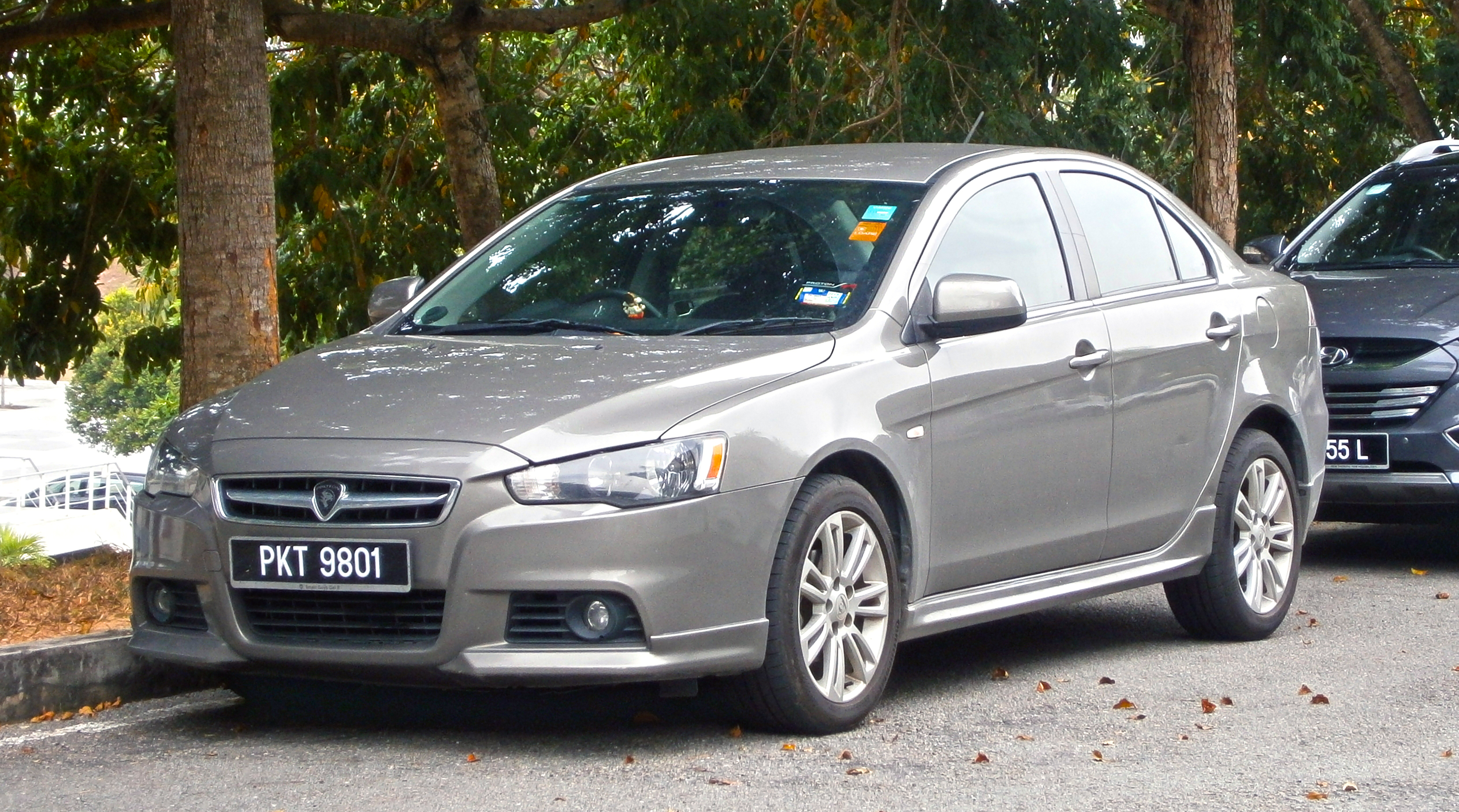
The Proton Inspira, the last of the Mitsubishi-based Protons.

Mitsubishi Motors Corporation (MMC) and Mitsubishi Corporation (MC) were instrumental in the foundation of Proton. The large majority of vehicle platforms, engines, parts and technical expertise were once sourced from Mitsubishi Motors. Additionally, the managing director of Proton between 1988 and 1993 was Kenji Iwabuchi, a former Mitsubishi Motors executive. Proton's staff were also trained by Mitsubishi in Japan as part of a bilateral agreement. Management of Proton was gradually assumed by Malaysians in the 1990s. All Proton cars launched between 1985 and 2000 with the exception of the Proton Tiara were based on Mitsubishi vehicles. Proton began producing indigenously designed models after 2000, but resumed product collaboration with MMC in 2008. The result of the renewed collaboration is the Proton Inspira, a rebadged 2007 Mitsubishi Lancer for sale exclusively in the Malaysian market. It marked a return to closer ties between Proton and MMC.

MMC and MC held a minority 30% joint stake in Proton, while a majority 70% stake was held by the Heavy Industries Corporation of Malaysia (HICOM). The Mitsubishi joint stake was later reduced to 15.86%, or 7.93% each for MMC and MC respectively until it was fully sold to Khazanah Nasional in January 2005. Mitsubishi Motors, Japan's sole unprofitable carmaker of that period sold its 7.93% Proton stake earlier in March 2004 in an effort to reduce its ¥1.14 trillion (US$11 billion) debt. The sale of Mitsubishi's joint stake in Proton marked the end of its 22-year investment in Proton.

=== Citroën ===
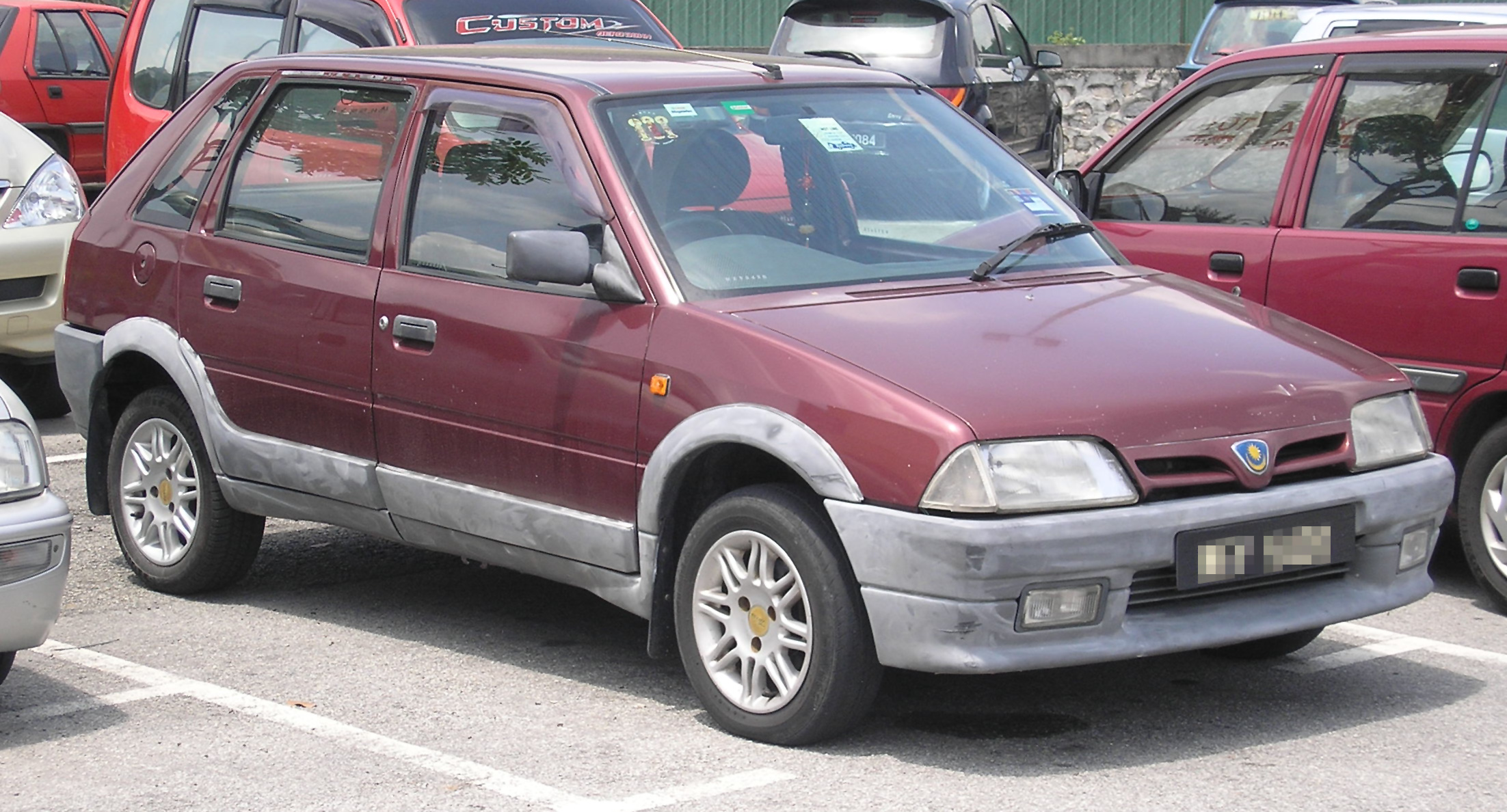
The Proton Tiara.

In 1994, French car manufacturer Citroën announced plans for the production of diesel-powered cars in Malaysia under a joint venture with Proton. Proton's then CEO, Tan Sri Yahaya Ahmad also advocated an alliance with PSA Peugeot Citroën for the purpose of technology transfer. Negotiations continued until 1995, but materialised in 1996 with the launch of the Proton Tiara. It was based on the Citroën AX and powered by a 1.1L Citroën I4 petrol engine, in contrast to the plans for a diesel option. The joint venture between Proton and Citroën stagnated after the death of Yahaya Ahmad in a helicopter crash the following year. The Proton Tiara failed to compete against its rivals from Perodua and production ended in 2000, four years after its launch.

=== Youngman ===
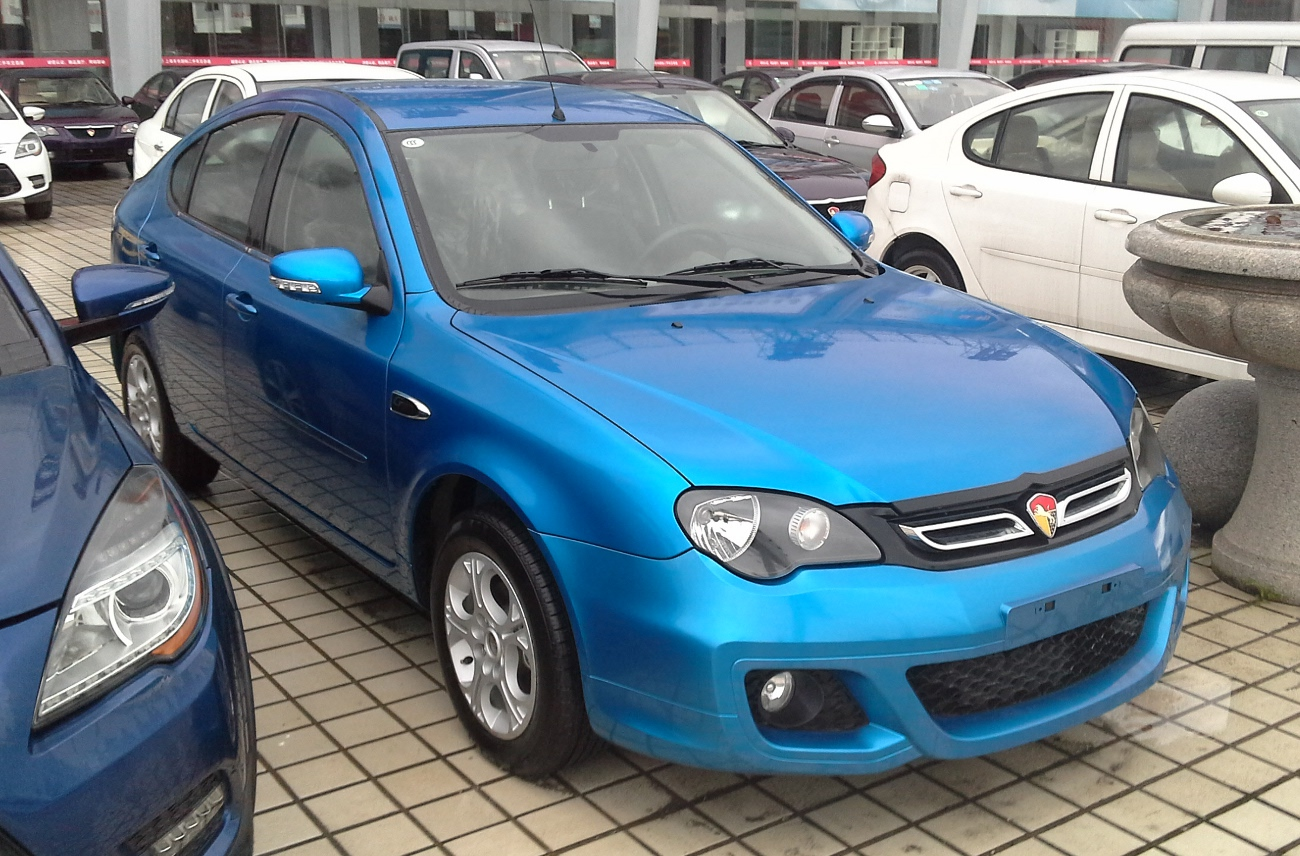
2014 Youngman Lotus L3 GT 5-door, a rebadged Proton Gen-2.

Proton entered the People's Republic of China in 2007 under a strategic joint venture with China Youngman Automobile Group Co., Ltd. The agreement involved a minimum of 30,000 Proton Gen-2 CBU units which were rebadged in China under Youngman's Europestar marque. In 2008, the Proton Persona became the second model to be sold under the Europestar brand. The Gen-2 and Persona were known as the RCR (short for RaCeR or Racing) and Jing Yue between 2007 and late 2009, but both cars were facelifted and renamed as the L3 5-door and L3 4-door (or L3 Sedan) for the 2010 model year respectively. Both models received unique parts and facelifts from Youngman between 2007 and 2013. The most recent facelifts of the Europestar L3 GT 5-door (Proton Gen-2) and Europestar L3 GT 4-door (Proton Persona) offer new front bumpers, unique grilles and mirror-mounted turn signals on the exterior, in addition to a redesigned climate control cluster and leather upholstery on the interior. Youngman has also introduced less expensive variants of their L3 hatchback and saloon models, powered by the 1.5-litre Mitsubishi 4G15M engine.

Youngman unveiled the Europestar L5 hatchback and saloon models at the 2011 Shanghai Motorshow. The exterior design and interior equipment are indigenous to Youngman, but both cars are based on an extended Proton GEN-2 platform (2,670mm, 70mm longer than the original) and powered by Proton's CamPro CPS 1.6-litre engine. The Europestar T5 was previewed on 23 April 2012, a SUV designed by Lotus and Youngman and based on the Proton Gen-2 platform. It was scheduled for a late 2012 launch but it was never put into production.

Between mid-2009 and February 2015, Youngman Lotus had reported total production figures of 196,234 rebadged CKD GEN-2 and Persona units, of which 189,872 were reportedly sold. (Note: Does not include sales of rebadged CBU GEN-2/Persona units, or Youngman Lotus' indigenously designed models.) However, by mid-2015, the China Passenger Car Association (CPCA) stopped reporting Youngman Lotus sales numbers because they were "way off" from registration numbers. Youngman Lotus had ceased production and sales altogether by mid-2015. In February 2015, Proton announced that they would revive their joint venture with Fujian-based Goldstar, and would not renew their contract with Youngman.

=== Honda ===
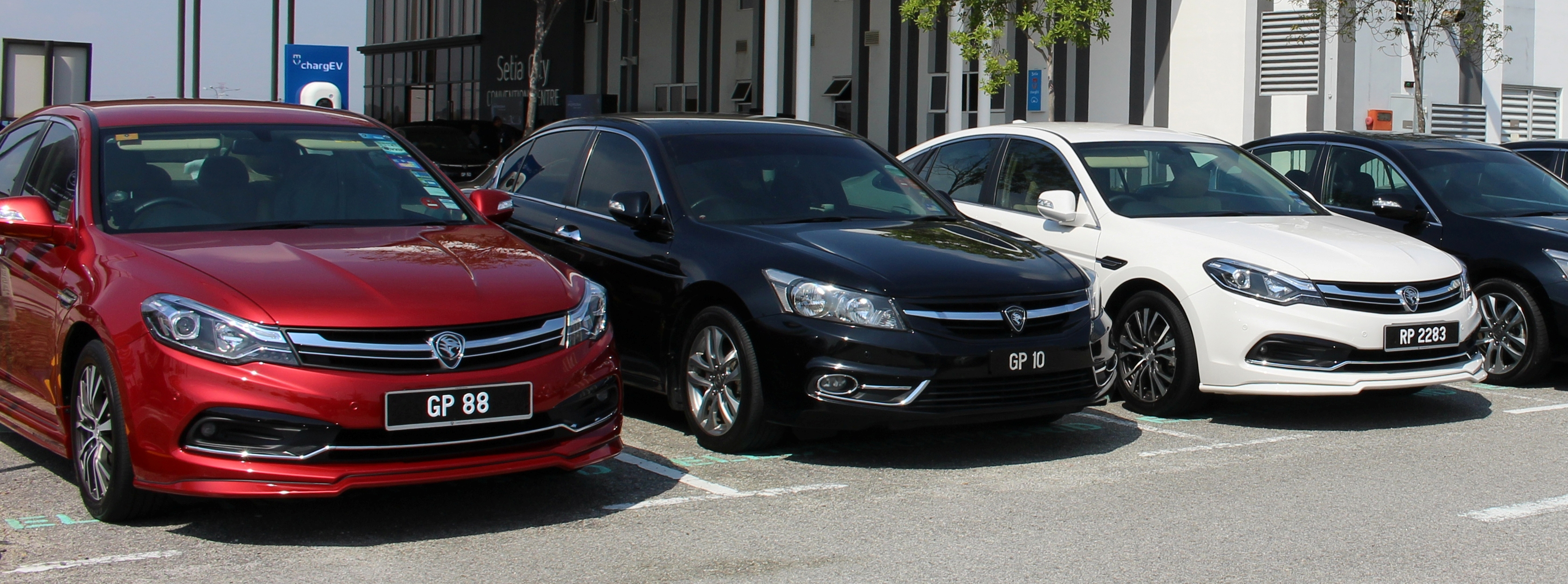
The Proton Perdana (CP), based on the eighth generation Honda Accord.

On 29 October 2012, Proton entered a collaboration with Honda Motor Company, Ltd. Both companies have agreed to explore collaboration opportunities in the areas of technology enhancement, new product line up and the sharing of vehicle platforms and facilities.

In November 2013, it was revealed that the PRM would be based on the North American eighth generation Honda Accord. The PRM will launch in two phases, the first in mid-December for sale exclusively to the Malaysian government and the second within the next two years for the Malaysian domestic market. Around 3,000 units of the PRM will be produced initially to replace the ageing Proton Perdana V6 fleet in use by the federal government. The result of the collaboration, the second generation Proton Perdana, was unveiled on 11 December 2013 at an official ceremony in Putrajaya.

=== Suzuki ===
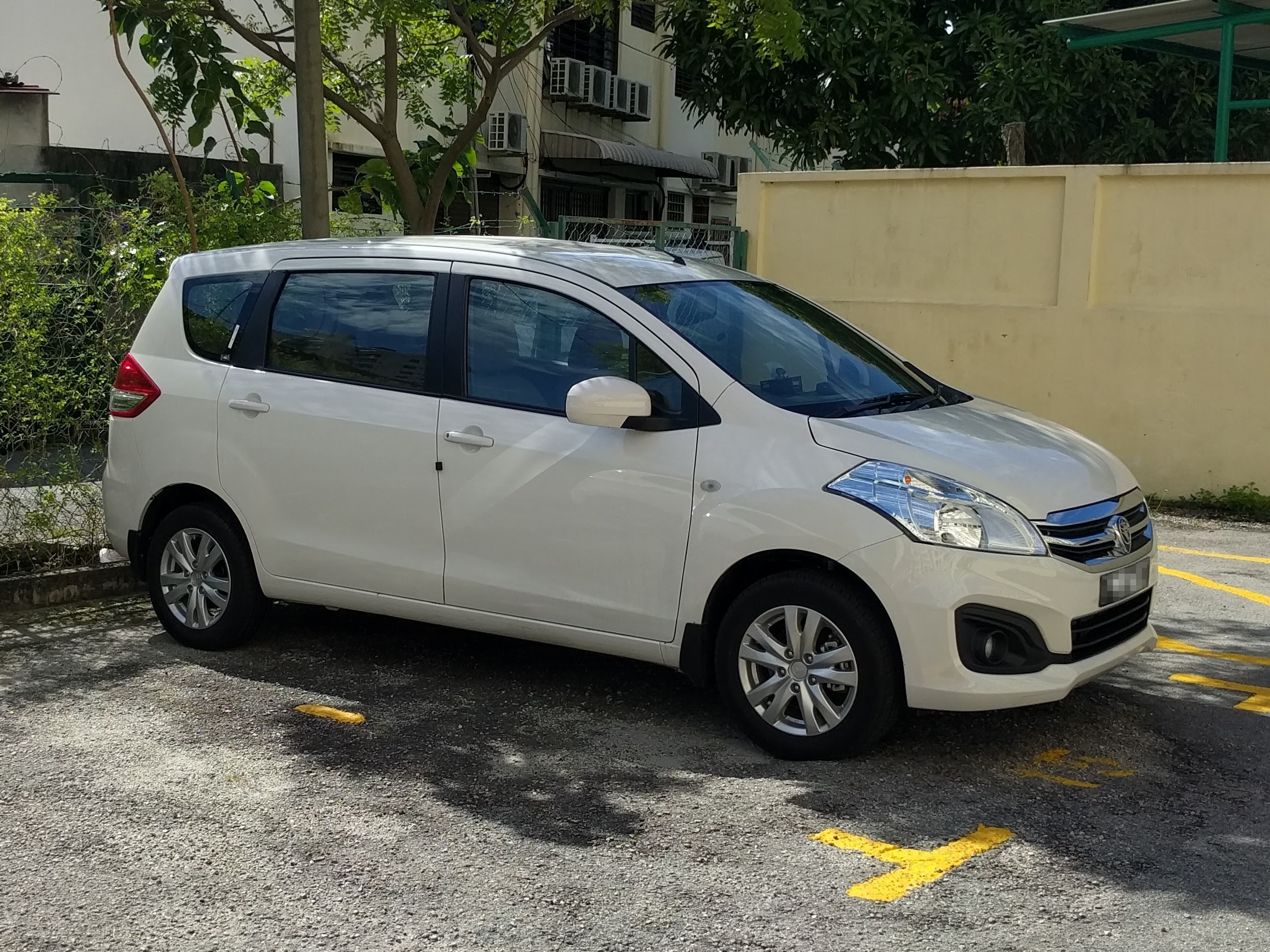
The Proton Ertiga.

Proton partnered with Suzuki and rebadged the Suzuki Ertiga. Under the June 2015 agreement, 25 of its 3S and 4S Suzuki dealership outlets have been converted into Proton Edar outlets and bearing both Proton and Suzuki logos.

=== Geely ===
PROTON Holdings parent company DRB-HICOM announced sold 49.9% stake in Proton to Zhejiang Geely Automobile Holdings. Following the entry of China's Geely as a shareholder of PROTON, PROTON Holdings secured the intellectual properties to the design, development, manufacture, sale, marketing and distribution of the Geely Boyue, Geely Binyue and Geely Haoyue for Brunei, Indonesia, Malaysia, Singapore and Thailand.

Proton announced the launch of the Proton's first sport utility vehicle which is based on Geely Boyue, with touches of local design elements introduced for the Malaysian market. The first batch of the locally named Proton X70 will be imported from China, with localisation plans afoot with the expansion of their Tanjong Malim plant.

With the incoming sales and tax exemption plans for EVs coming in by 2022, Proton announced a roadmap of hybrid, PHEV and BEV products for the future. While no specific electric model was mentioned, there is a possibility of the tech to be led by Geely's new powertrain brand, Leishen Hi-X.

== Motorsport ==
=== 1980s and 1990s ===
Proton has a significant historical presence in motorsports. In the late 1980s, an alliance consisting of Proton, Malaysian oil and gas company Petronas, Mitsubishi Motors of Japan and distributor of Proton cars, Edaran Otomobil Nasional (EON) led to the formation of the Petronas EON Racing Team (PERT). The team focused primarily on rallying and has been in motorsports as early as 1987. PERT won the 1989 Shell Malaysia Rally with Proton Saga rally cars which were prepared by Mitsubishi's Ralliart division, featuring powerful 150 bhp engines as part of its rally specifications. PERT won several other international rallies including the 1991 Rally of Thailand, 1993 Dubai International Rally and the Rallye Ng Philipinas in 1995, 1996 and 1997 respectively.

=== 2000s ===
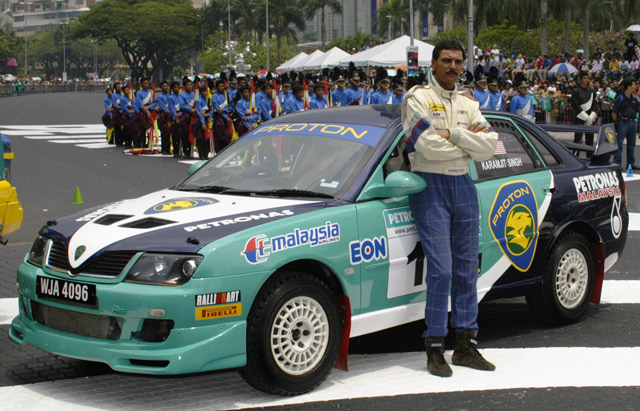
Proton PERT with veteran Malaysian rally driver Karamjit Singh.

Proton's presence in international motorsports peaked when the Petronas EON Racing Team won the 2002 Production World Rally Championship with veteran Malaysian rally driver Karamjit Singh in a Proton PERT, a rebadged Mitsubishi Lancer Evolution. The Proton-Karamjit duo also won the 2001, 2002 and 2004 Asia-Pacific Rally Championship titles, and the 2000 Sepang 12 Hours.

In 2003, the Proton Motorsports Division, also known as "Race.Rally.Research., R3", was established. R3 assumed the responsibility of Proton's motorsports endeavours, which had been held by Ralliart of Mitsubishi Motors. The first model to benefit from R3 engineering was the Proton Satria R3 which launched in late 2004 with a limited run of 150 units.

=== Asia-Pacific Rally Championship ===
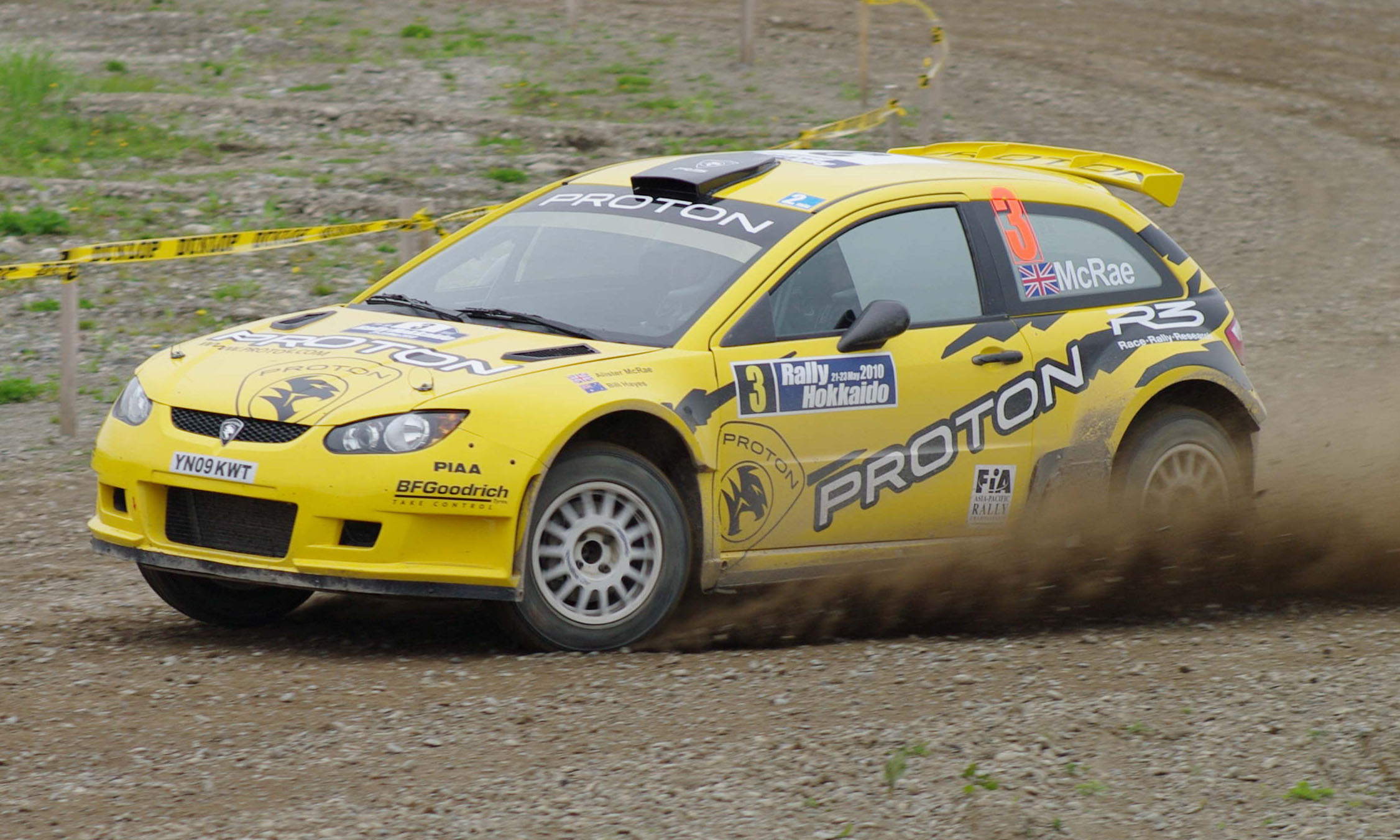
Alister McRae in his Proton Satria Neo S2000 at Rally Hokkaido during the 2010 APRC season.

Proton re-entered the Asia-Pacific Rally Championship (APRC) in 2010, an international rally championship organised by the FIA encompassing rounds in Asia and Oceania. Proton had previously participated in the APRC, but withdrew in 2005 due to financial problems. The company competes under the official team name of Proton Motorsports with former WRC drivers Chris Atkinson and Alister McRae from Australia and Scotland respectively in a pair of Proton Satria Neo S2000 rally cars. The new Satria Neo S2000 replaced the Proton PERT as Proton's premier rally car, and was prepared by British-based Mellors Elliot Motorsport (MEM) in accordance to FIA Super 2000 specifications. The cars cost over RM1 million each and are equipped with 280 bhp (271Nm) 2.0 litre engines paired to 4WD drivetrains. Despite facing technical problems and stiff competition from the superior Mitsubishi Lancer Evolution and Subaru Impreza rally cars, Proton drivers McRae and Atkinson placed 3rd and 5th respectively in the 2010 APRC season.

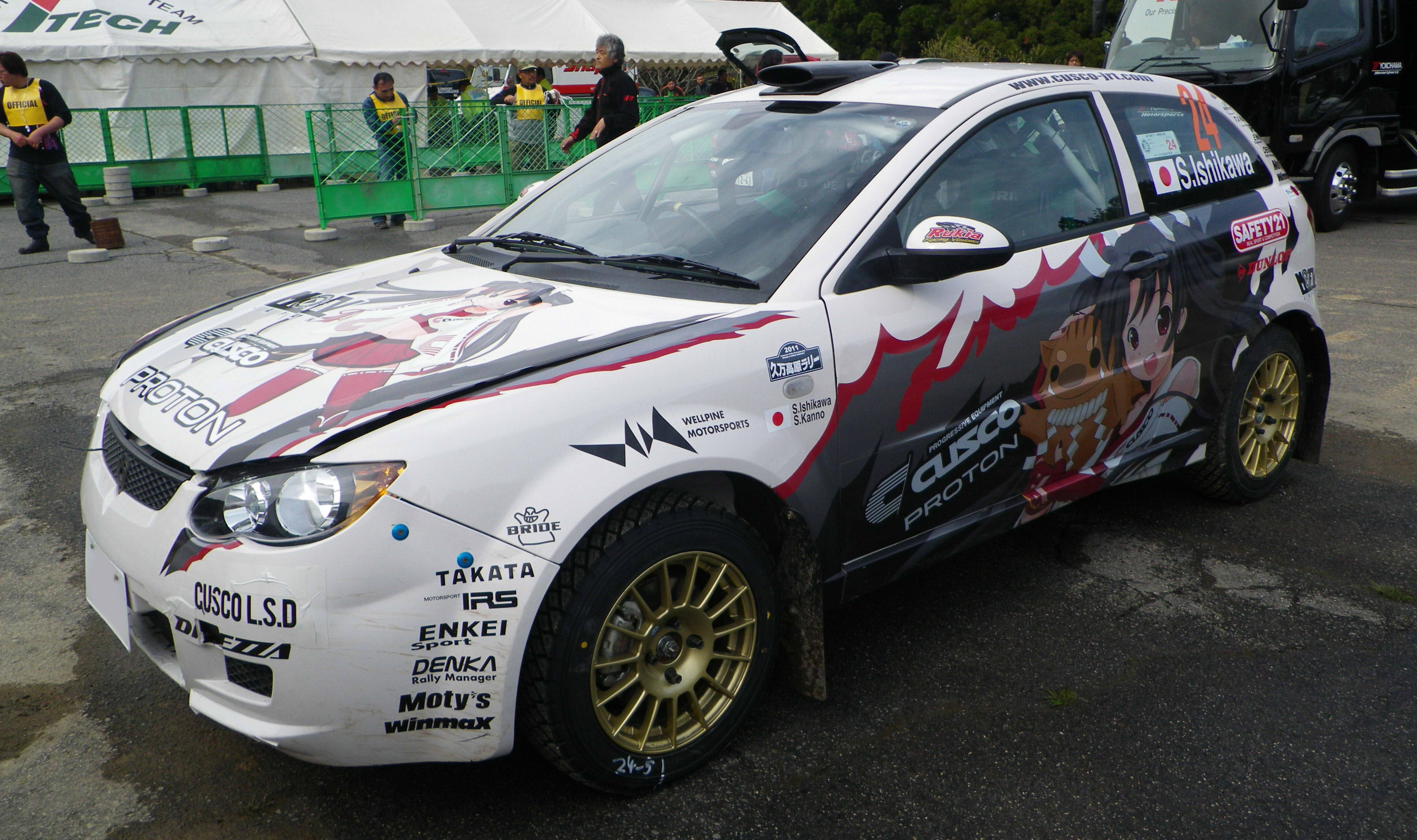
2011 Proton Satria Neo CUSCO Edition in Japan.

The following year, Malaysian rally veteran Karamjit Singh rejoined the APRC after a 6-year absence under the Proton R3 Cusco Rally Team in a Group N 2WD CUSCO Japan-tuned 1.6L CamPro 145 hp (170Nm) version of the Satria Neo. Japanese rally driver Akira Bamba also contested in the 2011 APRC season in another Satria Neo CUSCO. The 2011 season concluded with a one-two Proton Motorsports victory with drivers McRae and Atkinson in their Satria Neo S2000s. Karamjit placed 1st in the 2WD category and 7th overall in the championship, ahead of Bamba who placed 9th overall.

In the 2012 APRC season, Chris Atkinson left Proton Motorsports after two years of racing history with the team. Atkinson joined Indian Team MRF instead where he piloted a Škoda Fabia S2000 alongside Indian rally veteran Gaurav Gill. The vacant slot in Proton Motorsports was filled by Swedish racer Per-Gunnar Andersson who also raced for Proton in the Intercontinental Rally Challenge. Additionally, Proton R3 Cusco added a third driver, Malaysian Kenneth Koh, whereas Dreams India driver Sanjay Takle participated in another 2WD Satria Neo. The 2012 season ended with a Team MRF victory, with Atkinson and Gaurav placing first and fourth respectively in their S2000 Škodas. Proton Motorsports driver McRae clinched second, but Andersson placed a lowly seventh overall with the S2000 Satria Neos. Proton R3 Cusco racers Karamjit, Bamba and Kenneth placed fifth, sixth and eight respectively and Dreams India's Sanjay placed ninth overall.

=== Intercontinental Rally Challenge ===
Proton entered into the Intercontinental Rally Challenge 2009 with the Proton Satria Neo Super 2000. Their best result in IRC is Alister McRae finish 2nd place at 2009 Rally Scotland. Drivers in 2009 were Karamjit Singh, Guy Wilks, Bryan Bouffier and Alister McRae scoring 13 points. In 2010 Proton team had many retirements and did not score a single point. Drivers for 2010 were Alister McRae, Chris Atkinson, Niall McShea, Keith Cronin, Gilles Panizzi and privateer with factory support, Tom Cave. Best result of 2010 season was 22nd place of Gilles Panizzi at 2010 Rallye Sanremo, although it was the only finish of Proton Satria Neo S2000 in this season.

=== British Touring Car Championship ===
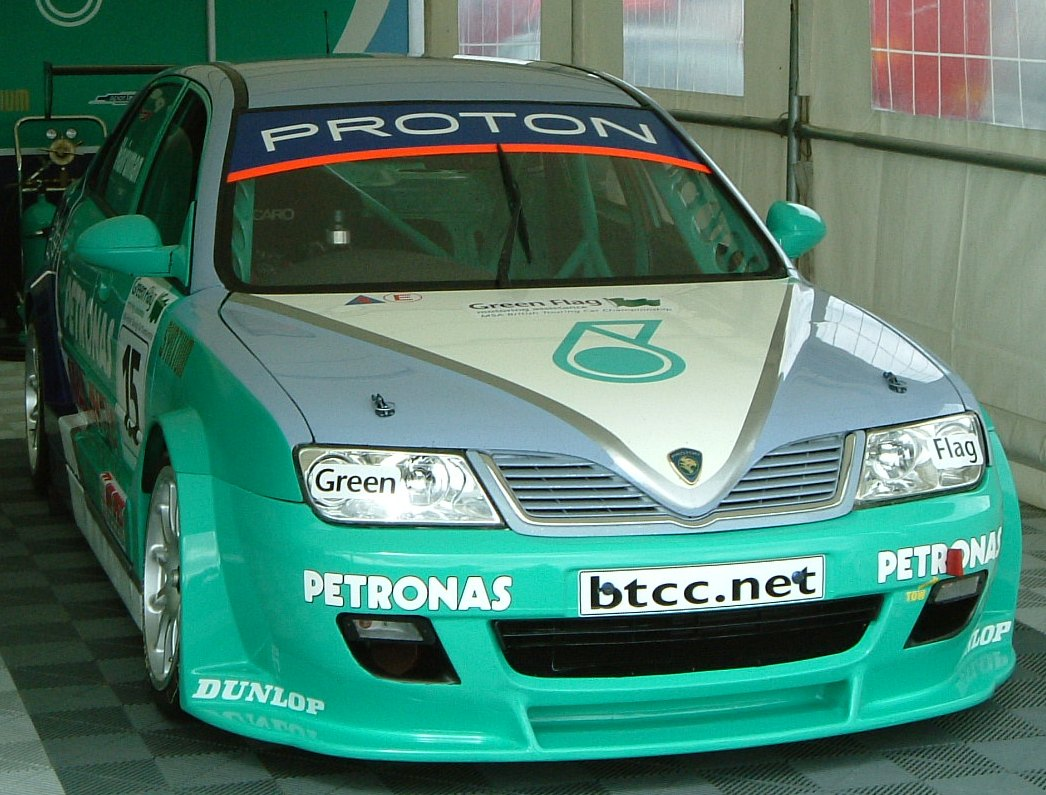
The BTC-T Proton Impian of Team Petronas Syntium Proton at Knockhill Circuit, Scotland.

The British Touring Car Championship (BTCC) is a touring car racing series held each year in the United Kingdom. Proton participated in the BTCC between 2002 and 2004 as the Petronas Syntium Proton (Team PSP). The team in the 2002 and 2003 BTCC seasons was headed by Scottish and English drivers David Leslie and Phil Bennett respectively in two heavily modified BTC-T Proton Impian touring cars. They were succeeded by South African Shaun Watson-Smith and Malaysian Fariqe Hairuman in the 2004 season.

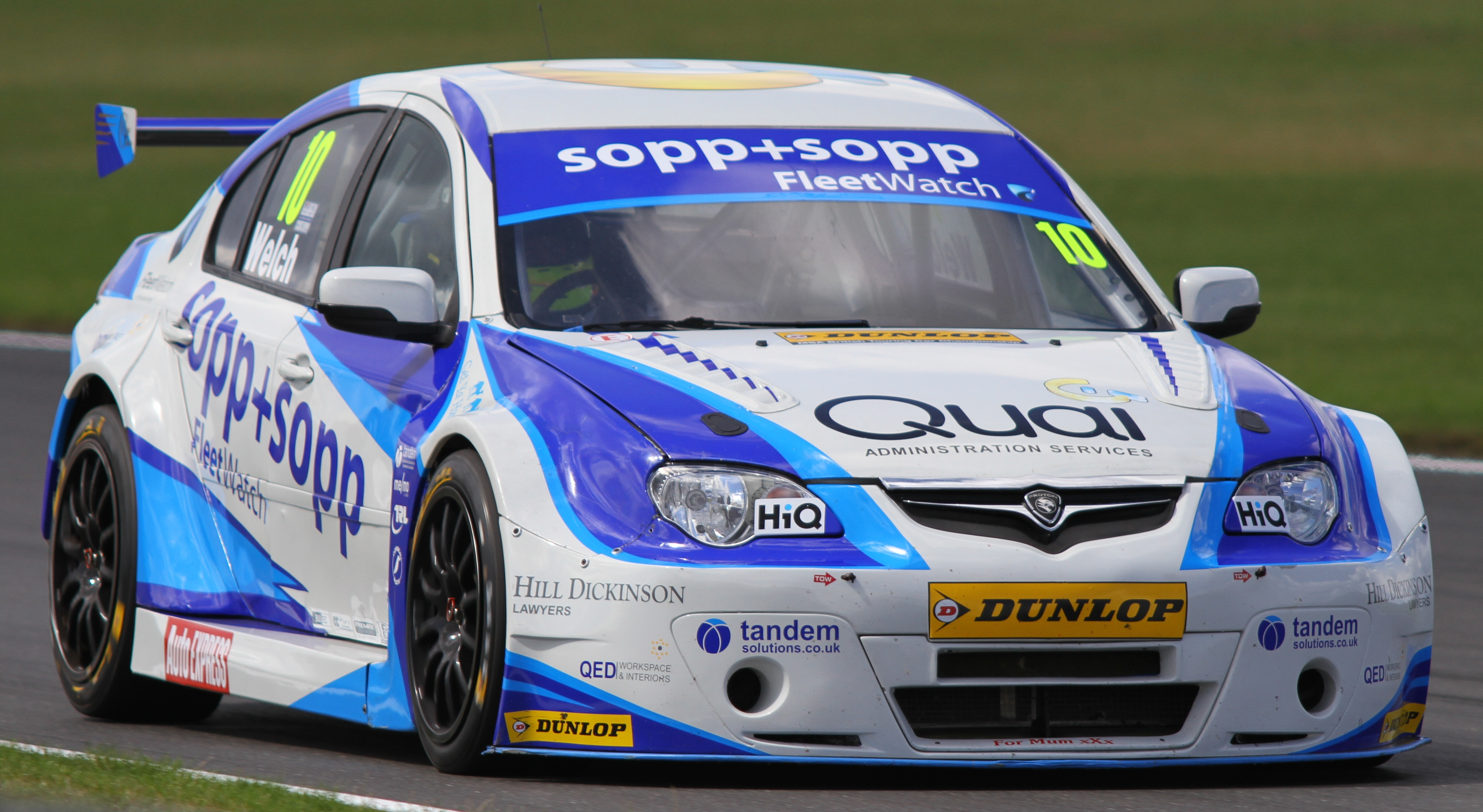
Daniel Welch's NGTC Proton Persona at the 2013 BTCC Snetterton GP, England.

In 2011, UK-based Welch Motorsport contested the BTCC in a Proton Persona NGTC, driven by Daniel Welch. Welch Motorsport competes independently and is not tied to Proton, but indirectly supported by Proton UK The team made its debut in the second half of the 2011 BTCC season and scored a point in the final race at the Silverstone Circuit, placing 22nd overall in the tournament. In comparison, 2011 Drivers' Champion Matt Neal of Honda Racing Team scored 257 points.

Welch Motorsport's performance improved significantly in the 2012 BTCC season. Daniel Welch had his best race at Oulton Park, where he finished sixth in race one, and held off defending champion Matt Neal to claim fourth position in race two. Welch Motorsport placed 15th overall with 79 points in the 2012 season, with 2012 Drivers' Champion Gordon Shedden scoring 408 points in comparison.

Welch Motorsport expanded to a two-car team in the 2013 BTCC season. The Proton Persona NGTC returns in the hands of Daniel Welch, whereas the second car is a Super 2000 Mk 2 Ford Focus driven by David Nye.

== Football ==
Proton and Norwich City F.C. signed a 3-year sponsorship deal in 2003, becoming the Canaries main sponsor for their home kit, whilst Proton-owned Lotus Cars would feature on the away kit. The deal, reportedly valued at a "seven-figure sum", was the largest sponsorship deal in the club's history. Proton's chief executive officer Tengku Mahaleel Ariff said the sponsorship deal would bring more awareness and recognition to the Proton brand, which it currently lacked.

In 2005, Proton opened a showroom at Norwich City's Carrow Road stadium, featuring products from Proton and Proton-owned brands. It was incorporated into the stadium's Jarrold Stand.

== Awards and accolades ==
- People's Choice, Automotive Category (Silver) – Putra Brands Awards 2017
- People's Choice, Automotive Category (Silver) – Putra Brands Awards 2018

== See also ==
- Automotive industry in Malaysia
