= Proton Prevé =

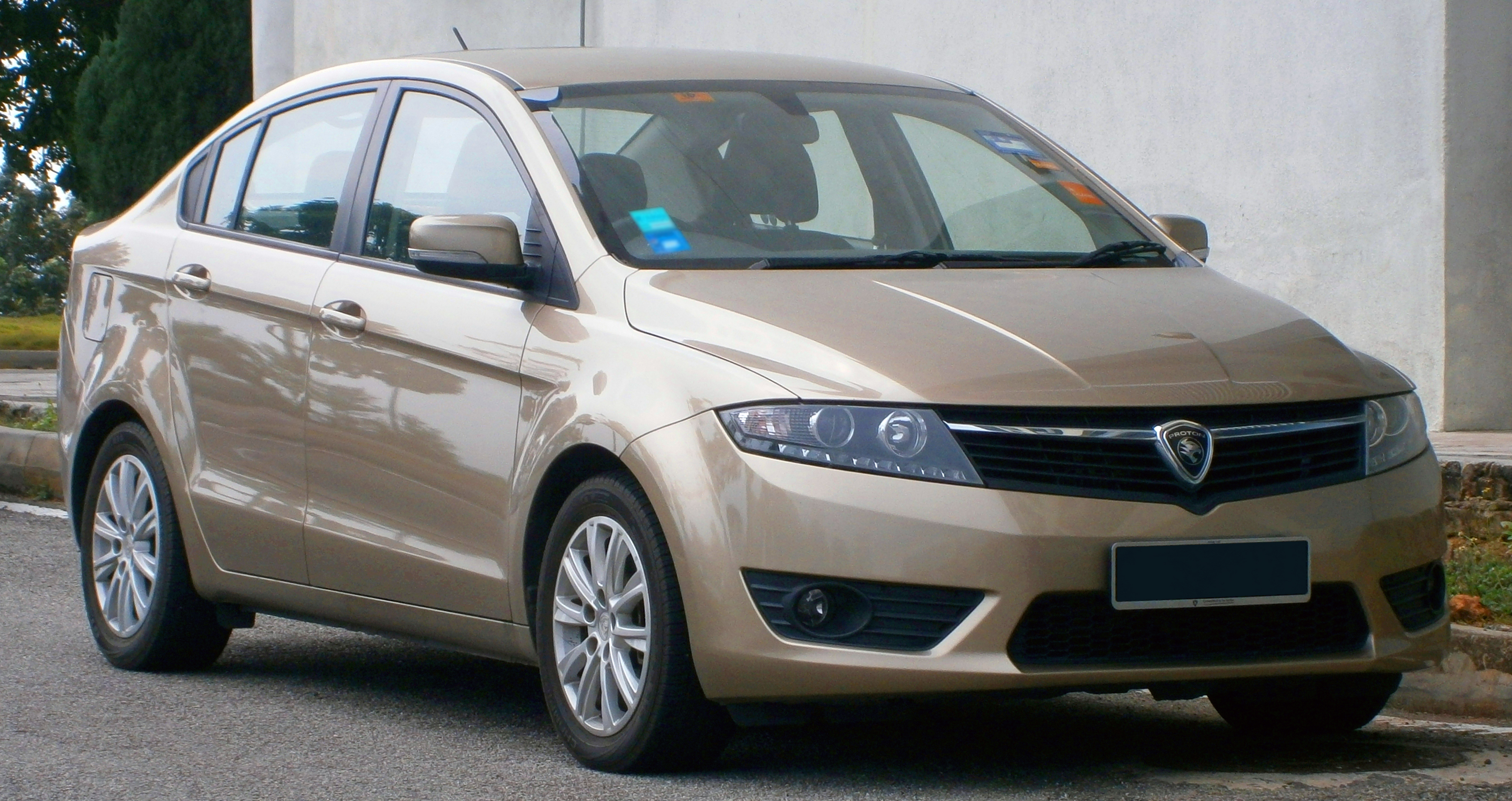

Overview
- Manufacturer: Proton
- Production: February 2012 – December 2018
- Assembly: Malaysia: Proton City (PTMSB); Bangladesh: Chittagong (PHPAL)
- Designer: Italdesign Giugiaro S.p.A. Azlan Othman

Body and chassis
- Class: Compact car (C)
- Body style: 4-door saloon
- Layout: Front-engine, front-wheel drive
- Platform: Proton P2
- Related: Proton Suprima S

Powertrain
- Engine: 1.6 L CamPro IAFM+ DOHC I4; 1.6 L CamPro CFE DOHC I4 Turbo; 1.6 L CamPro CFE DOHC I4 Turbo (Gasoline/LPG; Prevé LPG)
- Transmission: 5-speed manual CVT; CVT manumatic

Dimensions
- Wheelbase: 2,650 mm (104.3 in)
- Length: 4,543 mm (178.9 in)
- Width: 1,786 mm (70.3 in)
- Height: 1,524 mm (60.0 in)
- Kerb weight: 1,305–1,340 kg (2,877–2,954 lb)

Chronology
- Predecessor: Proton Inspira; Proton Persona (CM) (spiritual)
- Successor: Proton S70

The Proton Prevé is a four-door compact saloon developed by Malaysian automobile manufacturer Proton. It was launched on 16 April 2012 and is based on Proton's next-generation P2 platform. The Prevé is the saloon complement to its sister car, the Proton Suprima S hatchback, and is also the successor of Proton Inspira.

The Prevé is claimed to be Proton's first global car, evident in the name Prevé itself, which means to prove or proof.

== History ==
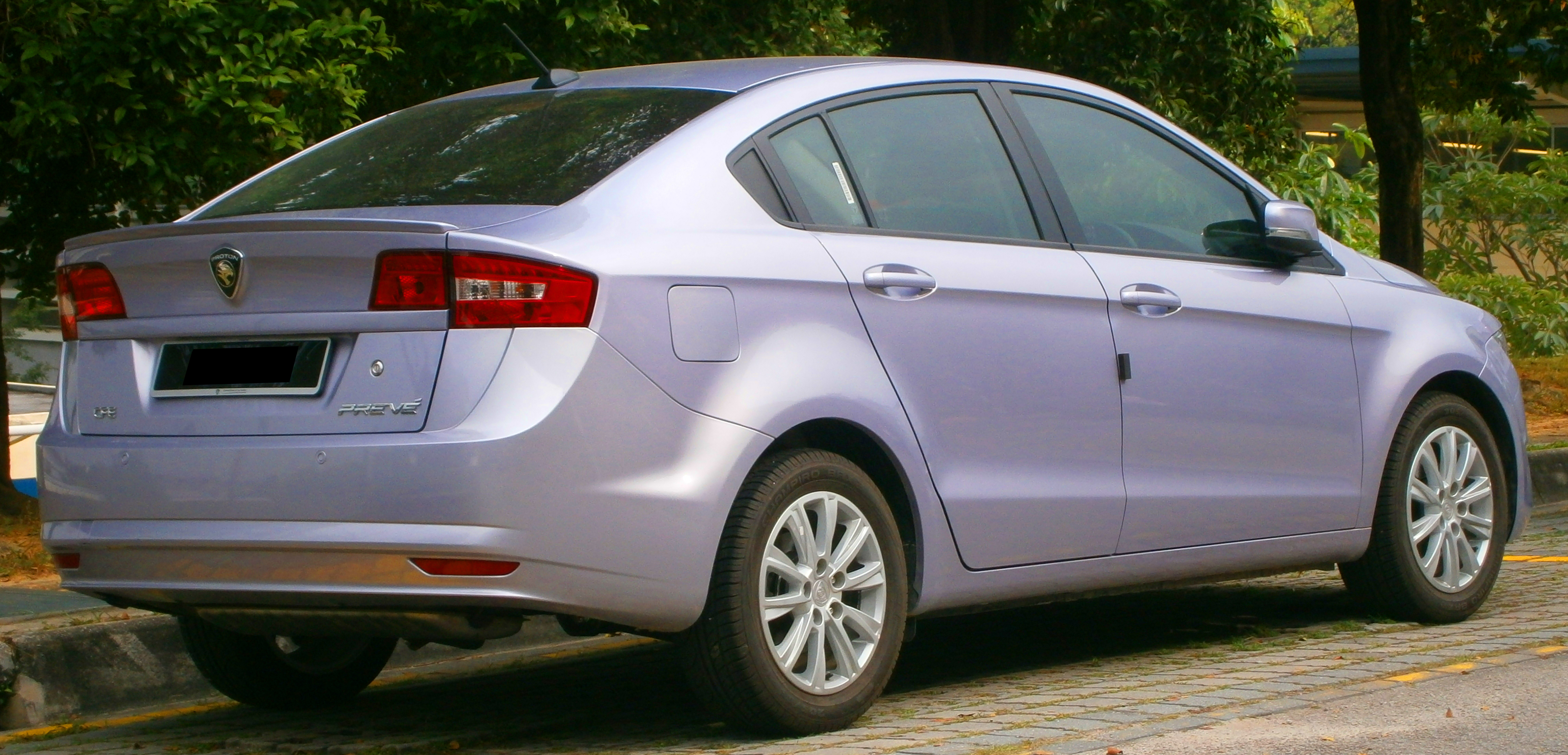
Rear view

Proton started out in 1983 as a manufacturer of badge-engineered Mitsubishi vehicles. Proton cars managed to sell in great numbers because they benefited from the superior engineering and reliability of the Mitsubishi cars they were based on, among other reasons. However, with the dawn of the 21st century, Proton moved forward with the introduction of indigenously designed models such as the Proton Waja and Proton GEN•2. Unfortunately, these next-generation Protons were universally criticised for being poorly engineered vehicles. Consequently, Proton's Malaysian market share declined significantly in the early 2000s, hitting a seven-year low in 2007. In response, development of the Proton Prevé (code named P3-21A) was initiated in 2009 under the leadership of the then Managing Director of Proton, Syed Zainal Abidin. Former BMW Vice President of Quality Management R&D, Dr. Wolfgang Karl Epple was also appointed that same year as Proton's Director of Quality. He was later promoted to Senior Director Group Operations, where he contributed to the development of the P3-21A project.

The Proton Tuah, a concept car designed by Italdesign Giugiaro was exhibited at the 2010 Kuala Lumpur International Motor Show (KLIMS). It previewed the various design elements and features in the upcoming Proton P3-21A. Development of the P3-21A was completed a year later and production took place at Proton's Tanjung Malim plant. The company claimed 94% of the car's parts were locally sourced in an effort to reduce capital outflow. The official name Proton Prevé was only revealed days before its launch.

The Proton Prevé was finally unveiled on 16 April 2012 at Seri Kembangan by the sixth Prime Minister of Malaysia, Najib Razak. It launched with a choice of six colours and three trim variants, the Executive MT, Executive CVT and Premium CVT. Both Executive trim variants are powered by Proton's 1.6L CamPro IAFM+ engine. The Executive MT is paired with a five-speed manual gearbox whereas the Executive CVT is equipped with a CVT. The Premium trim is offered with the superior 1.6L turbocharged CamPro CFE engine, mated to a CVT, also known as ProTronic, Proton's version of a manumatic transmission. Safety-wise, the Executive variants are equipped with dual SRS airbags, an anti-lock braking system (ABS) with electronic brakeforce distribution (EBD), whereas the Premium trim features an additional two airbags, brake assist (BA), traction control (TCS) and electronic stability (ESC) on top of those offered in the Executive. The Premium variant is also equipped with exclusive kit such as steering-mounted paddle shifters, automatic headlights and wipers, cruise control, climate control, a built-in touchscreen GPS head unit with Bluetooth, USB & iPod connectivity as well as push-start engine ignition. All Proton Prevés are equipped with a Smart Information Display system (SiD) that displays information such as average fuel consumption, battery health and distance to empty. Another standard feature is in-car WiFi, made possible by a collaboration between Proton and Malaysian ISP, Yes 4G.

The Prevé is priced between RM59,540 and RM72,990. It received over 11,000 bookings within two months of its official launch and became the 7th-best-selling car in Malaysia for the month of May 2012, topping all rivals in its category.

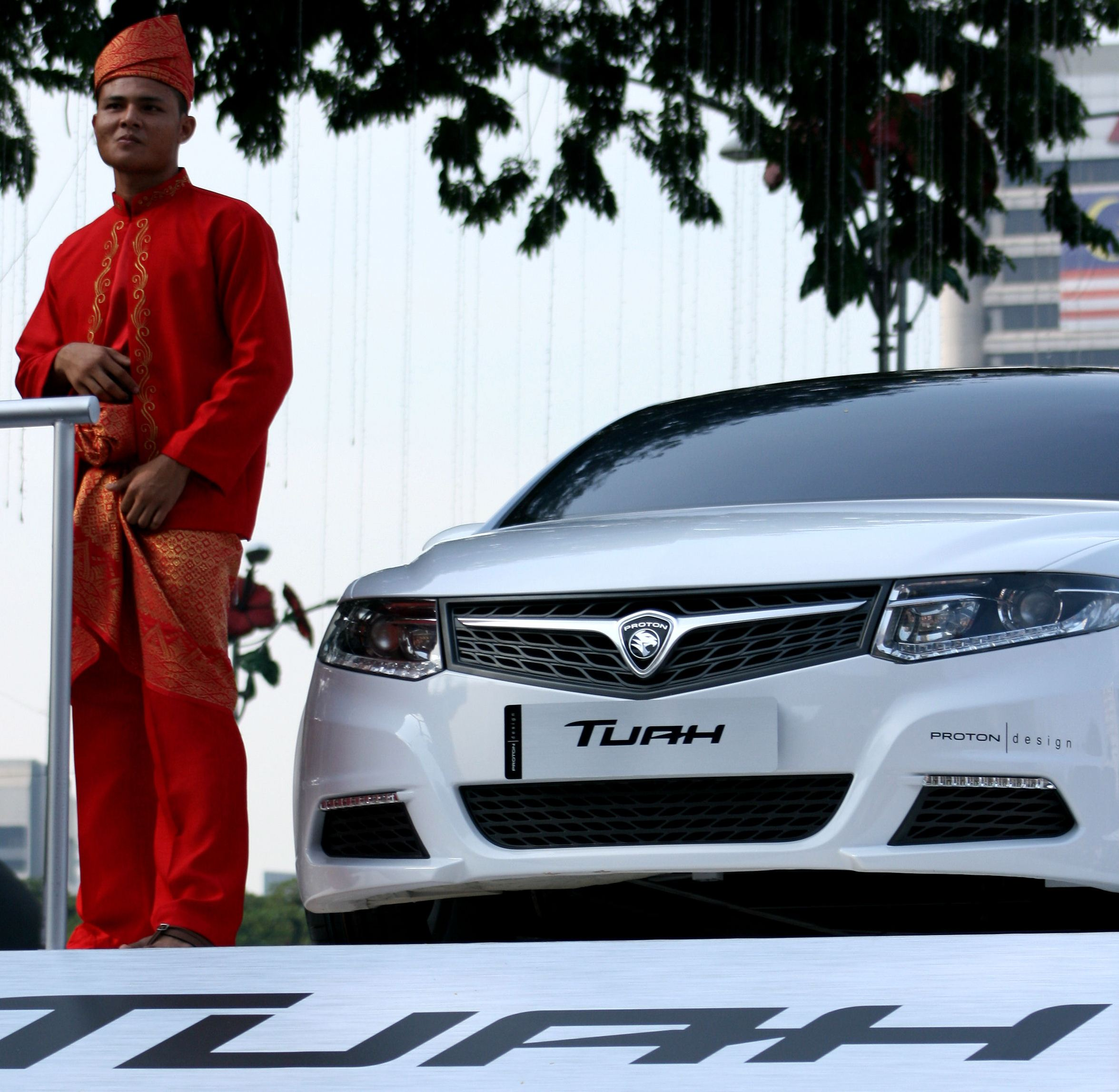
2010 Proton Tuah Concept

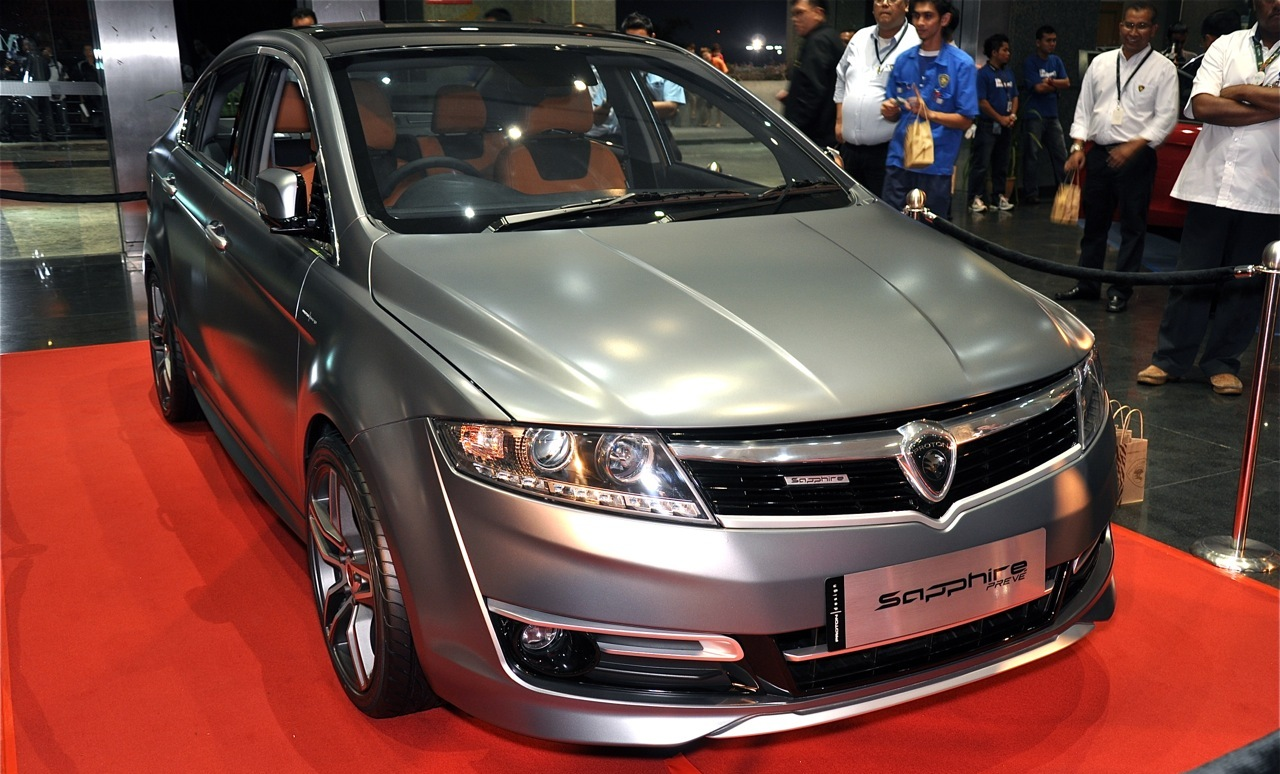
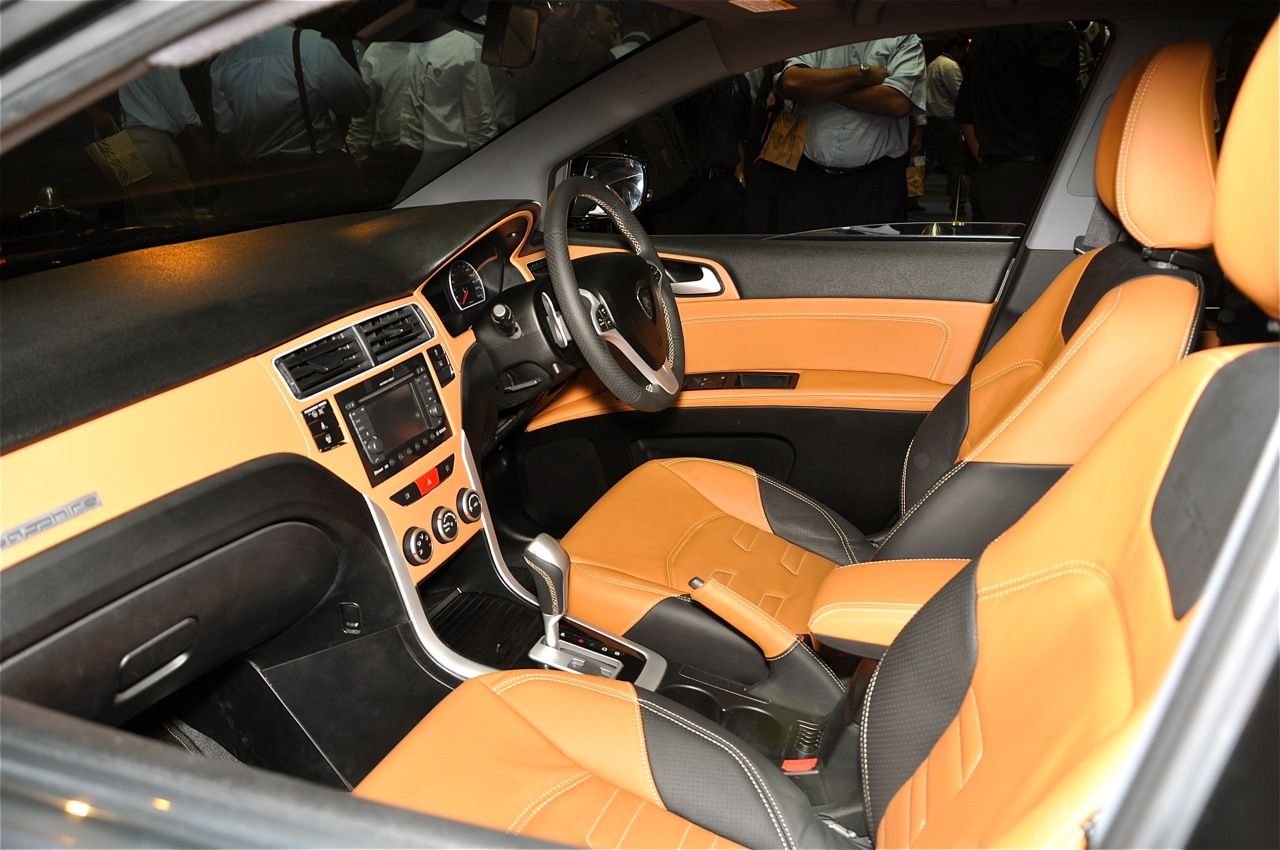
2012 Proton Prevé Sapphire Concept

The Proton Prevé Sapphire Concept was also exhibited at the launch ceremony. It was developed by Proton Design in an effort to demonstrate the Prevé's market and technical potential. It features a unique matte gun-metal paint job in addition to custom front and rear bumpers which are complemented by chrome plated highlights, side skirts and 18-inch alloy rims. The interior sports beige coloured panels and leather upholstery for added luxury appeal, and the ride height and brakes of the car were also revised. 3 months later, Proton announced the Proton Prevé R3 Concept at the Malaysian leg of the 2012 Asia-Pacific Rally Championship season. It was fitted with a new RM3,000 body kit styled by Proton's Race, Rally, Research (R3) division as well as optional R3 rims and performance tyres. On 8 October 2012, Proton revealed the Prevé R3 racing car. It is powered by the 107 hp CamPro IAFM+ engine and features extensive exterior and interior modifications. It later competed in the 2012 Sepang 1,000 km endurance race in December that year, where it placed second after R3's Proton and ahead of Type R Racing Team's Toyota Corolla Altis.

The Prevé made its debut in Australia on 18 October 2012 at the 2012 Australian International Motor Show. Only the CamPro IAFM+ variants were made available at the Australian launch, but the turbocharged CamPro CFE model was delayed to a November 2013 launch instead. The Prevé was introduced in the Thai market during the Thailand International Motor Expo on 28 November 2012. It has been tuned to run on E20 fuel and an improved Blaupunkt 2-DIN touchscreen head unit is offered in the Thai-spec Premium trim variant. In addition, a new budget-oriented Standard trim line was introduced in that market, priced significantly lower than the Executive and Premium trim variants. Brunei became the third export market to receive the Prevé on 7 February 2013, where it is made available in three variants. The Prevé was also met with a less publicised launch in Singapore during the first quarter of 2013, where it is offered in two trim lines. On 13 June 2013, Indonesia became the fourth official export market for the Prevé, where it is currently available in just one high-end variant. Proton unveiled the Prevé LE on 18 October 2013 in its domestic market, offering the 5-star ANCAP safety rated specifications of 6 airbags, ABS, BA, EBD, TCS and ESC in addition to leather seats and a special R3 bodykit, complemented by 17-inch R3 alloy rims. Only 100 units will be produced, with each retailing at RM79,688, or around RM7,000 more than the Prevé Premium trim. The Prevé also joined the Royal Malaysia Police patrol fleet in 2013, making it the latest in a long line of Proton saloon cars which include the widely used Saga, Wira and Waja, respectively.

The updated 2014 Proton Prevé was quietly introduced into the Malaysian market in November 2013. All Prevé variants on sale in Malaysia are now equipped standard with all engineered safety features, bringing them up to 5-Star ANCAP specifications and thus placing them on par with the Australian market Proton Prevé. Proton launched a liquefied petroleum gas (LPG) variant of the Prevé exclusively for Thailand in early 2014. The Prevé LPG is fitted with a dedicated 58-litre tank in the boot and a fuel gauge module on the dashboard, as well as a separate inlet inside the petrol filler compartment. Both the CamPro IAFM+ and CFE engines have been modified to run on both LPG and E20 petrol. All other specifications remain unchanged over the launch models, and the Prevé LPG is priced between 664,000 and 798,000 baht, whereas the regular Prevé continues on sale between 625,000 and 759,000 baht, respectively.

The Proton Prevé had a planned 2014 launch in the United Kingdom. A left-hand drive Prevé prototype was also caught in action in May 2012, hinting at a future launch in China and the Middle East as well.

In July 2015, Proton signed a distributor agreement with Chile-based Andes Motor, and the first left-hand drive Prevé and Exora evaluation units were shipped to Chile in November. On 1 March 2016, Proton commenced the first official shipment of 50 Prevé units, the first of an anticipated 1,000 Chilean bound Protons this year. The Chilean launch of the Proton Prevé commenced in May 2016 as planned. Three variants are available, namely Standard, Executive and Premium, ranging from $10,490 to $14,490. Both Standard and Executive variants are fitted with the 107 hp CamPro IAFM+ engine and a five-speed manual transmission. The range topping Premium is equipped with the 138 hp CamPro CFE/Turbo, paired to the updated ProTronic VT3+ CVT from the Suprima S. The Standard and Executive lines are only fitted with dual front airbags, while the Premium model offers additional twin side and twin curtain airbags. Nonetheless, Electronic Stability Control is standard on all Chilean market Prevés, along with a 5-year/150,000 km warranty. The launch of the Prevé in Chile marks Proton's return to the market after an 18-year hiatus. Chile is currently Proton's only South American export market, and the first and thus far only country to receive the left-hand drive Prevé.

In March 2015, Proton announced plans to assemble the Prevé in Bangladesh through a joint-venture with PHP Group. A new Tk 400 crore (RM 190 million) assembly plant would be constructed in Chittagong to facilitate an annual production output of 1,600 Proton cars.

In 2015, Proton Australia dropped the Prevé from its lineup, but sold any remaining models in their dealerships.

In May 2017, PHP Automobiles launched the Bangladeshi-built Proton Prevé 1.6 Turbo. The company intends to market the Prevé as an alternative to used imported cars which dominate the local market.

In 2018, Proton quietly updated the Prevé for the Malaysian market. The manual transmission was discontinued and the Executive variant engine was upgraded to the CamPro CFE/Turbo engine. NVH was improved and for the exterior received blacked-out grille, black bootlid garnish, black roof and black wing mirrors.

The Prevé is also sold in Egypt with two variants: Executive and Premium. Both variants are powered by Proton's CFE engine paired to a CVT transmission. The specifications are close to that of the Malaysian market Prevé apart from safety where the Executive variant only has 2 front airbags opposed to 6 in the Malaysian Executive Prevé. A batch of Proton cars including the Prevé departed Malaysia in September 2018 and arrived in Egypt in October 2018. Finally in March 2020, the Preve was removed from Proton's official website.

== Design ==
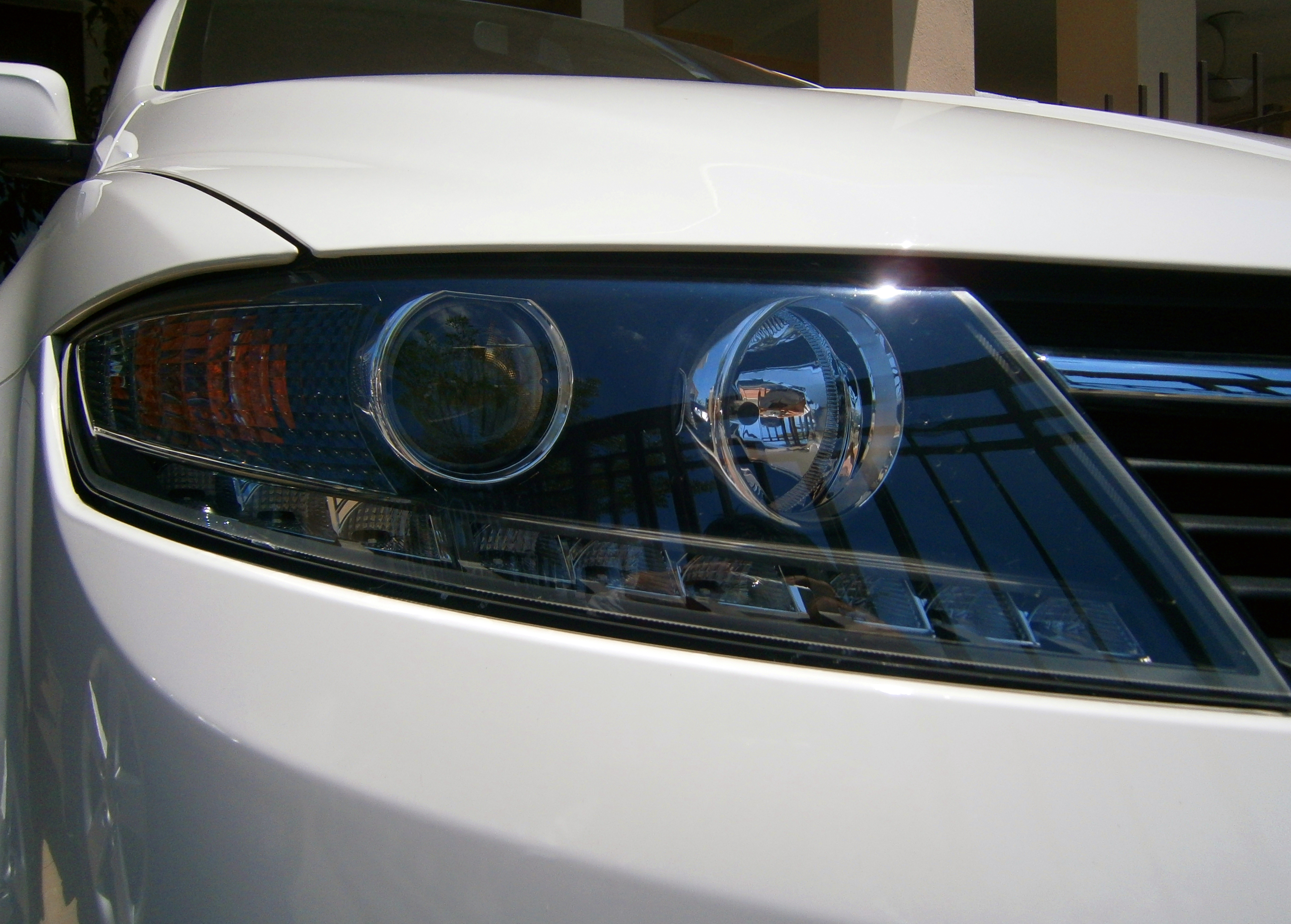
The headlights on the Prevé sport LED position lamps.

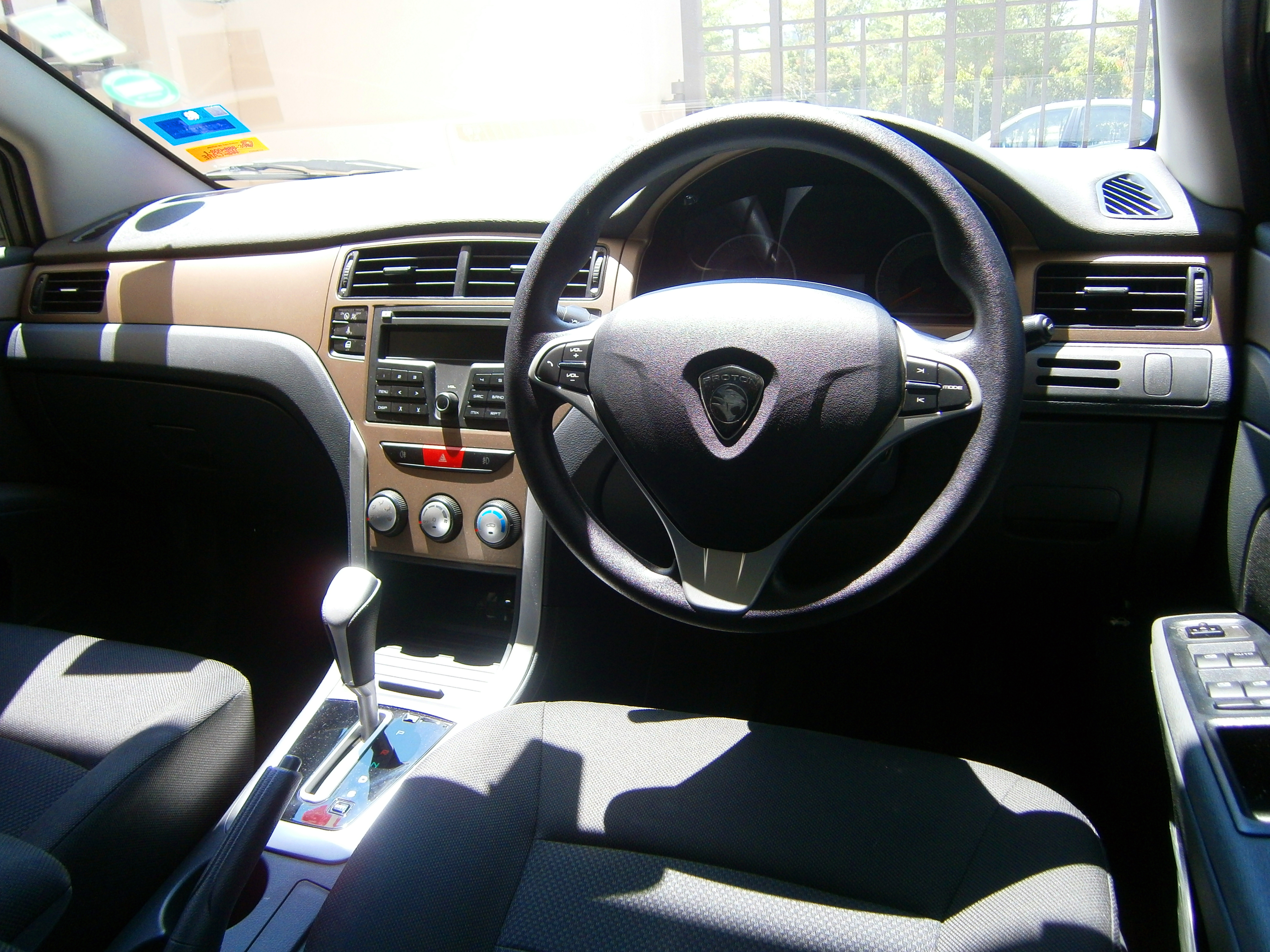
The interior of the Proton Prevé Executive.

Proton sought to create a new signature façade with the Prevé. The result is Proton Wings, a unified design element that fuses the headlights, Proton emblem and air-intake grille, giving it a distinctive look of a bird ascending. The Prevé is the first Malaysian-made car to be factory-fitted with LED position lamps. The exterior of the car was styled to sport a reduced drag coefficient in an effort to enhance fuel efficiency. Proton collaborated with Italy-based Italdesign Giugiaro S.p.A. for the styling and likeness of the Prevé. Italdesign is also responsible for the styling of the 2010 Proton Tuah concept car. Additionally, Azlan Othman, Proton's Head of Styling was dispatched to Turin under the collaboration with Italdesign which lasted almost a year.

Proton's then Senior Director Operations, Dr. Wolfgang Karl Epple revealed that the Prevé was developed by an international consortium consisting of experts from Malaysia, Italy, France, Germany and South Korea. Additionally, several components of the car are also sourced from Japan, South Korea, Australia and Europe. "If you put global ingredients in the components, people, processes, styling and packaging, you get something which is global", Epple commented. Nonetheless, Proton later claimed that 94% of the Prevé's components are locally sourced in an effort to reduce capital outflow.

The Prevé is also one of the larger cars in the C-segment traditionally popularised by Japanese and Korean offerings in the Malaysian market.

== Safety ==
- (Australia) / (New Zealand) - ANCAP -

ASEAN NCAP test results Proton Prevé (2015)
Test	Points	Stars
Adult occupant:	15.38	5 /5 stars
Child occupant:	67%	3 /5 stars
Safety assist:	NA	

The Prevé became the first Proton car, and to an extent, the first Malaysian car to be awarded the full 5-Star safety rating by the Australasian New Car Assessment Program (ANCAP) of Australia and New Zealand. It also received a 5-Star rating from the Malaysian Vehicle Assessment Programme (MyVAP) of the Malaysian Institute of Road Safety Research (MIROS).

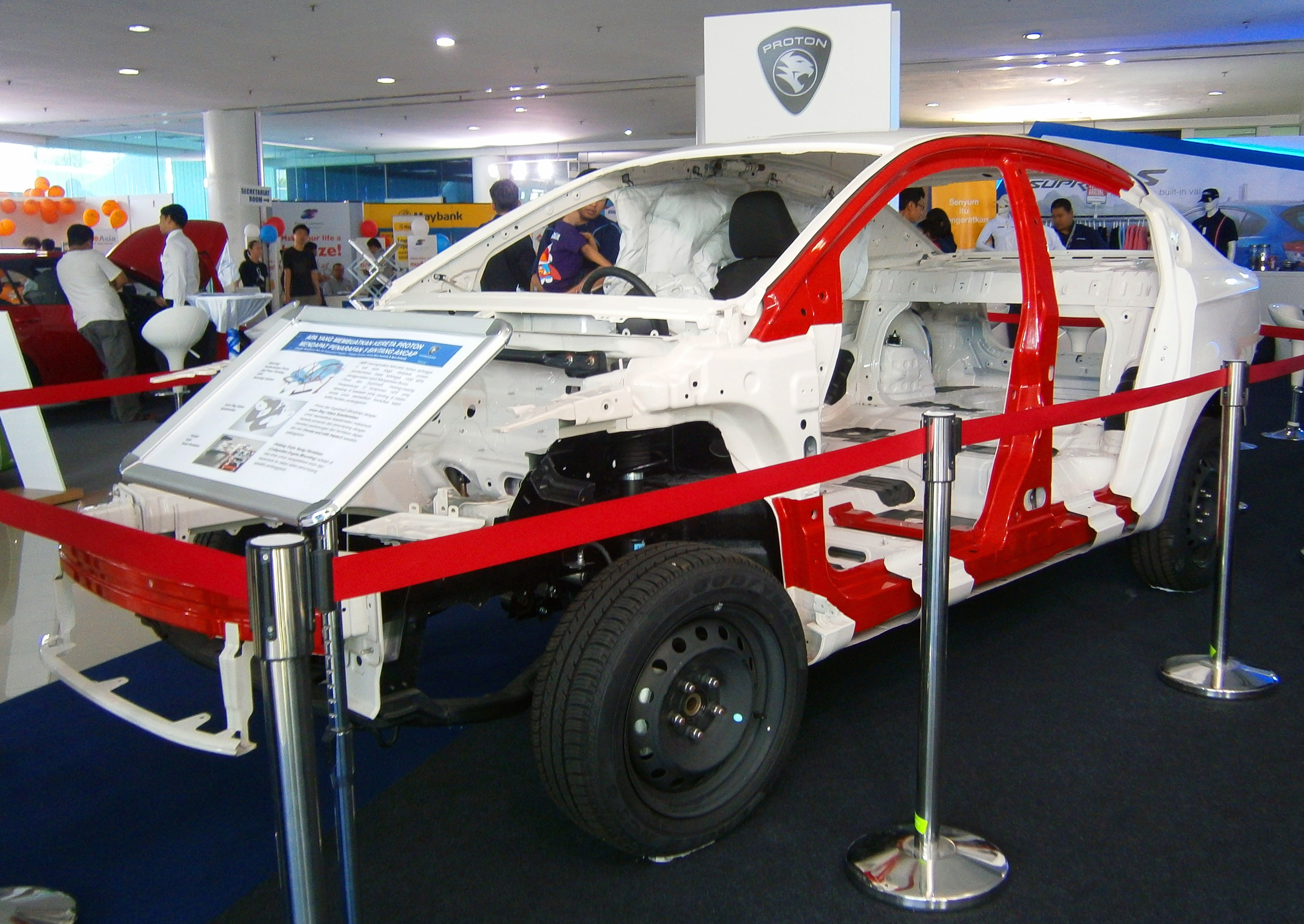
The Reinforced Safety Structure (RESS) helped the Prevé score 34.25 points out of the maximum 37 in its ANCAP crash test, making the Prevé safer than the Hyundai Elantra, Ford Focus and Nissan Pulsar.

Prior to the launch of the Prevé and Suprima S, Proton cars suffered from a poor safety reputation. The Proton Jumbuck infamously scored one star out of a potential five in its ANCAP test in 2009. Proton responded by raising safety standards significantly during the development of the Prevé. The Reinforced Safety Structure (RESS) frame was developed specifically for the new car. Proton employs the use of hot press forming (HPF), a process which was pioneered in Germany, during the frame's manufacturing process. Twelve incorporated HPF components help in the reinforcement of the passenger compartment for improved occupant safety. The end result is an increased tensile strength and torsional body rigidity of 19,000 Nm/degree. The usage of HPF in the Prevé's manufacturing process also helps in weight-saving, which translates into improved fuel efficiency, handling and performance. Proton is the only Original Equipment Manufacturer (OEM) in South East Asia to use Hot Press Forming in their manufacturing processes.

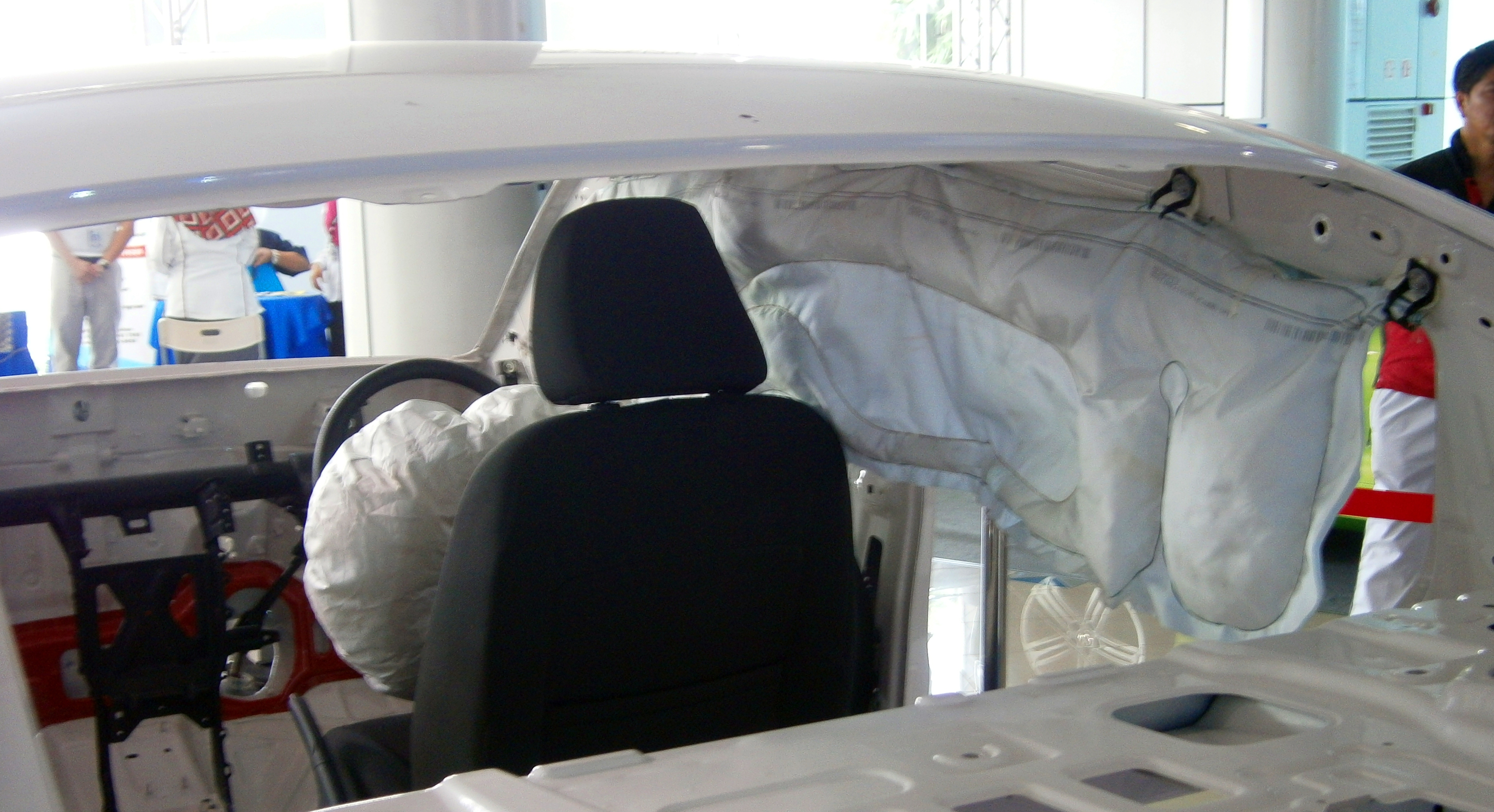
The RESS frame may encompass up to 6 SRS airbags; dual front, dual side and full-length curtain airbags. The inclusion of curtain airbags is a first for Proton.

The Proton Prevé has been developed to house a maximum of six SRS airbags, an anti-lock braking system (ABS) with electronic brakeforce distribution (EBD), Brake Assist (BA), Traction Control (TCS) and electronic stability control (ESC). However, the Prevé was only offered with a maximum of four airbags upon its April 2012 Malaysian debut. The maximum of six airbags were only offered upon the Prevé's Australian launch in October 2012. Later on 18 October 2013, Proton released the Prevé LE in its domestic market, offering exactly the same safety specifications as the Australian market Prevé models. The following month, Proton updated the Prevé range with all of its engineered safety features as standard equipment, thus standardising the Malaysian market Prevé as a 5-Star ANCAP-rated model.

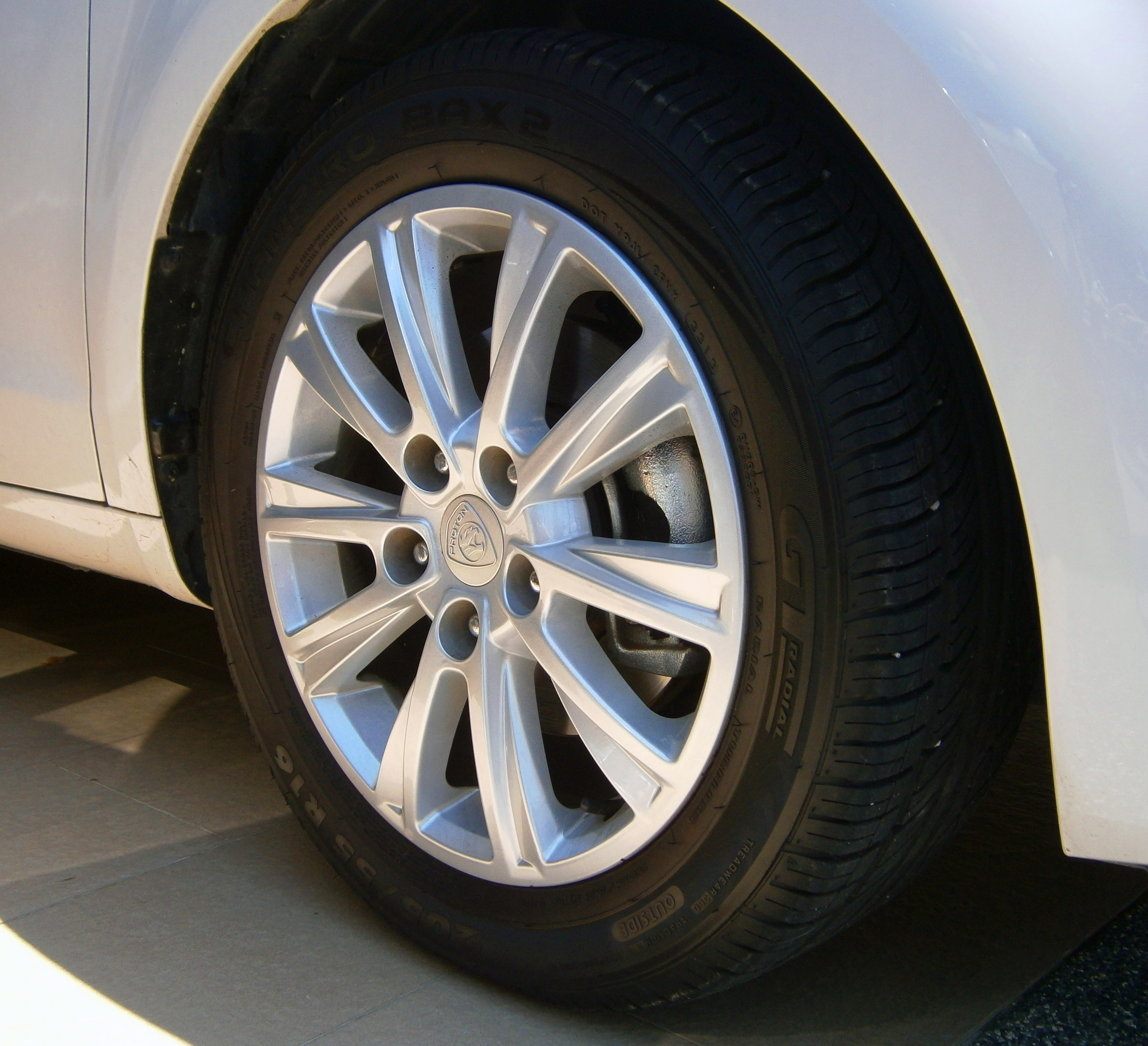
The 16-inch alloy rims on the Prevé.

Proton also tested the Prevé in different weather and road conditions during its development phase such as ice and snow in Sweden as well as intense heat in Spain. The suspension system consists of MacPherson struts for the front and a multi-link with stabiliser bar for the rear. The Prevé's suspension was tuned by Proton's British subsidiary, Lotus for superior ride & handling attributes. The setup has also been developed specifically for the 205/55 GT Radial Champiro Bax 2 tyres equipped with the car for increased grip. All Proton Prevés are fitted with front and rear 15-inch disc brakes as well as 16-inch alloy rims.

As of January 2014, Proton has prioritised safety as one of their main unique selling propositions (USP) and has been aggressively promoting their achievements with the Prevé and Suprima S. The company has promised that all new Protons launched from 2014 onwards will come with extensive safety equipment and feature a 5-Star ANCAP rating.

ANCAP test results* Proton Preve (2013)
Test	Score
Overall	5 /5 stars
Frontal offset	14.53/16
Side impact	15.72/16
Pole	2/2
Seat belt reminders	2/3
Whiplash protection	Good
Pedestrian protection	Marginal
Electronic stability control	Standard

== Powertrains ==
Manufacturer's claims, unless stated otherwise
Engine	CamPro IAFM+	CamPro CFE
Format	I4 DOHC 16V	I4 DOHC 16V
Total displacement (cc)	1,597	1,561
Bore × Stroke (mm × mm)	76.0 × 88.0	76.0 × 86.0
Maximum Output [hp(kW)/rpm]	107 (80) / 5,750	138 (103) / 5,000
Maximum Torque (Nm/rpm)	150 / 4,000	205 / 2,000 ~ 4,000
Maximum Speed (km/h)	180 (MT) / 170 (CVT-AT)	210 (CVT-MN)
Acceleration 0–100 km/h (sec)	12 (MT) / 12.5 (CVT-AT)	9.6 (CVT-MN)
Fuel tank capacity (litres)	50	50

The Proton Prevé is sold with a choice of two petrol engines: the CamPro IAFM+ and CamPro CFE. IAFM+ is an acronym for Intake Air Fuel Module Plus, whereas CFE stands for Charged Fuel Efficiency. Both engines are indigenously designed by Proton and Lotus.

The 1.6L CamPro IAFM+ I4 normally aspirated engine is capable of 107 horsepower (80 kW) at 5,750 rpm and 150 Nm of torque at 4,000 rpm. It can be mated to a five-speed Getrag manual transmission or a Punch Powertrain VT2 CVT. This CamPro IAFM+ is also used in the Proton Saga FLX SE.

The superior 1.6L CamPro CFE I4 engine incorporates a low-pressure intercooled turbocharger that delivers 138 horsepower (103 kW) at 5,000 rpm and 205 Nm of torque between 2,000 and 4,000 rpm. This engine is limited to a Punch Powertrain VT3 CVT, also known as ProTronic, Proton's version of a manumatic transmission. Proton claims the turbocharged 1.6-litre CamPro CFE is equivalent to a naturally aspirated 2.0-litre engine. The CamPro CFE consumes 6.6 litres of fuel per 100 km, while running at 90 km/h and was designed to conform to Euro V emission standards.

Proton is currently developing an all-new 3.1cc with 600hp 770Nm- turbocharged engine for the Prevé and Suprima S duo. A six-speed manual transmission option is also in development.

== Reception ==
Proton Prevé sales & production between 2012 and Q2 2016
Country	Total	Q2 2016	Q1 2016	2015	2014	2013	2012
Malaysia		1,126	1,305	7,750		40,000+	
Australia	1,048	33	65	336	344	270	
Indonesia	491	0	8	41	128	314	
Thailand	410	11	16	85	43	248	7
Chile	3	3					
Brunei							
Mauritius							
Singapore							
Total global sales						30,387 (Note: Includes sales of the Proton Suprima S, which account for an estimated 2,000 units in 2013.)	20,765
Total produced	66,244	1,578	514	10,164	9,282	18,403	26,303
Notes: Q1 2016 applies for the months of January, February & March 2016. Q2 2016 applies for the months of April, May & June 2016. Total applies for units sold in the specified country between sales inception and June 2016. Total global sales applies for combined units sold in all active markets. Total produced applies for all units produced between February 2012 and June 2016.

=== Malaysia ===
The Prevé has received generally favourable reviews from critics in its domestic market. Malaysian automotive journalist Danny Tan from paultan.org commended the Prevé's looks, practicality, ergonomics and NVH attributes. The ride comfort and handling characteristics were exceptionally praised, in which Tan claimed was "unrivaled in the Asian C-segment sedan class". However, the CamPro IAFM+ variants of the Prevé were not as well received in comparison with the turbocharged CamPro CFE model. The lack of power and torque from the IAFM+ engine was held responsible for poor acceleration and overall performance, but nonetheless competent in normal driving conditions. Tan also criticised some design flaws on the interior, such as the poorly designed head unit and instrument panel.

Live Life Drive gave the Prevé 4 out of 5 stars, praising the ride and handling, refinement and roominess of the Prevé, while pointing out several flaws which included the CVT powertrains, interior fit & finish, and the troubled Proton brand image. Autoworld.com.my shared similar impressions on the Prevé, where the authors declared it as Proton's best product to date, owing much to its ride and handling attributes, standard equipment and value for money appeal. The CVT powertrains and build quality were pointed out as its major let downs. Popular Malay-language automobile news portal funtasticko.net echoed generally positive sentiments, in which the reviewers concluded that the Prevé symbolised the beginning of a 'new Proton' intent on shedding its negative brand image, on the domestic and global stages alike.

=== Australia ===
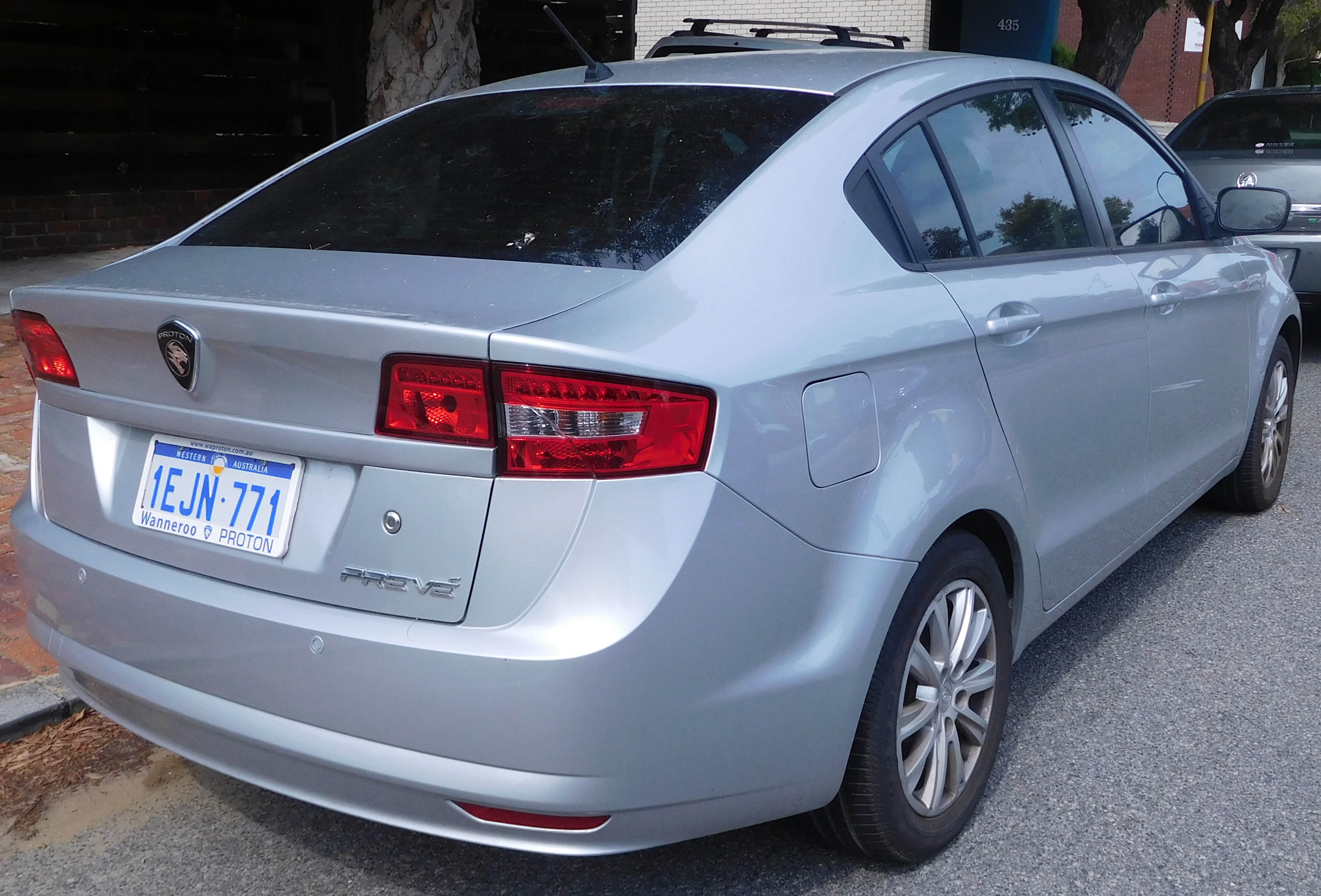
Proton Prevé GX (Australia)

Table of reviews on C-segment cars sold in Australia (Note: This table ranks (in alphabetical order) C-segment cars (but excludes luxury models like the Audi A3, BMW 1 Series, Mercedes-Benz A-Class etc.) based on web reviews (dated 2012 and later only) from professional Australian automotive journalists, who award a 'starred' or 'numbered' summarised rating. As such, it is not a definitive or holistic ranking, as there are many other reviews which do not fit this table's criteria. This table is intended to be used for rough or quick referencing and comparisons, and not as a means for definitive conclusions.)
Country	Car	Type	CarAdvice	TMR	CarsGuide	CarShowroom	Drive
(China)	Chery J3	Hatch	5/10	N/A	3/5 stars	N/A	N/A
(United States)	Ford Focus	Both	9/10	4/5 stars	4/5 stars	4/5 stars	N/A
(Australia)	Holden Cruze (SRi)	Hatch	N/A	4/5 stars	N/A	4/5 stars	N/A
(Australia)	Holden Cruze (SRi)	Sedan	8/10	N/A	3.5/5 stars	N/A	N/A
(Japan)	Honda Civic	Hatch	6/10	3.5/5 stars	4/5 stars	4/5 stars	N/A
(Japan)	Honda Civic	Sedan	6/10	3/5 stars	3/5 stars	4/5 stars	3.5/5 stars
(South Korea)	Hyundai Elantra	Sedan	7/10	3.5/5 stars	4/5 stars	4/5 stars	4/5 stars
(South Korea)	Hyundai i30 (SR)	Hatch	7/10	4/5 stars	4/5 stars	4/5 stars	N/A
(South Korea)	Kia Cerato	Hatch	8/10	3.5/5 stars	4/5 stars	4/5 stars	4/5 stars
(South Korea)	Kia Cerato	Sedan	8/10	3.5/5 stars	3.5/5 stars	4/5 stars	N/A
(Japan)	Mazda3	Hatch	8.5/10	4.5/5 stars	4/5 stars	4/5 stars	N/A
(Japan)	Mitsubishi Lancer	Both	5/10	2.5/5 stars	3.5/5 stars	3.5/5 stars	N/A
(Japan)	Nissan Pulsar	Hatch	7/10	N/A	N/A	4/5 stars	3.5/5 stars
(Japan)	Nissan Pulsar	Sedan	7/10	N/A	3/5 stars	N/A	N/A
(Malaysia)	Proton Prevé	Sedan	4/10	2.5/5 stars	3/5 stars	3/5 stars	2.5/5 stars
(Malaysia)	Proton Suprima S	Hatch	6/10	2.5/5 stars	N/A	N/A	N/A
(France)	Renault Mégane	Hatch	7/10	N/A	N/A	4/5 stars	N/A
(Czech Republic)	Škoda Octavia	Sedan	9/10	4.5/5 stars	4/5 stars	N/A	N/A
(Japan)	Subaru Impreza	Hatch	7/10	4/5 stars	3.5/5 stars	4/5 stars	3.5/5 stars
(Japan)	Subaru Impreza	Sedan	7/10	4/5 stars	4/5 stars	4/5 stars	3.5/5 stars
(Japan)	Toyota Corolla	Hatch	7/10	4/5 stars	4/5 stars	4/5 stars	4/5 stars
(Germany)	Volkswagen Golf (90TSI)	Hatch	10/10	4/5 stars	4.5/5 stars	4.5/5 stars	N/A
(Germany)	Volkswagen Jetta	Sedan	8/10	4/5 stars	N/A	4/5 stars	3.5/5 stars

The Proton Prevé has garnered mixed reviews from critics in Australia. Daniel DeGasperi from CarAdvice gave the Prevé GX 2 out 5 stars. The five-year warranty, free servicing and roadside assistance as well as the roomy interior, steering and handling were well-received and complemented the Prevé's five-star ANCAP rating. However, the car was met with severe criticism in terms of its expensive pricing, poor performance and fuel economy, lackluster build quality and refinement, uncomfortable urban ride quality and detail design flaws. Daniel commented "The Proton Prevé should be priced at least $4,000 cheaper, to be reasonably competitive against light sedans such as the Holden Barina and Nissan Almera. It is better than the Chery J3 that sells for $6000 less, but the Proton isn't necessarily 35 per cent better, and it certainly shares some of the Chinese-made hatchback's quality and refinement shortfalls." Proton Cars Australia however responded swiftly and positively, and the Prevé GX received a major $3,000 price cut on 1 August 2013, 2 months after the review was published. The 5-speed manual and CVT variants are currently priced at $15,990 and $17,990 driveaway, down from $18,990 and $20,990, respectively. Both variants are still offered with 5 years' warranty and 5 years' roadside assist, but 5 years' free servicing is no longer offered and has been replaced with a 5-year capped-price servicing scheme. Nonetheless, Proton Cars Australia bills the Prevé as "Australia's most affordable small car" with all things considered.

Since the price cut, the Proton Prevé GX has received more positive reviews from Australian critics. Ewan Kennedy and Peter Barnwell from CarsGuide awarded the 2014 Prevé GX 3 out of 5 stars and greatly emphasised its value-for-money appeal. Brad Leach from CarShowroom.com.au gave the car 3 out of 5 stars as well. Adam Davis from motoring.com.au and Grant Edwards from APN Australian Regional Media also praised the Prevé's pricing. However, the price cut did little to help in other cases, such as Toby Hagon's review from Drive.com.au in which the Prevé GX was awarded two-and-a-half stars out of five.

The Proton Prevé GXR CVT was finally launched in Australia between November and December 2013, almost a year after the Prevé GX Australian début. The GXR offers all the exclusive kit first seen on the Malaysian-market Prevé Premium trim and is priced at $23,990 drive-away, with an early bird $1,000 factory bonus. Australian-market Prevé GXRs are fitted with a Turbo badge in place of the usual CFE on the rear bootlid to emphasise the new turbocharged engine and to better distinguish the GXR from the GX variants. Additionally, a 6-speed manual variant of the Prevé GXR will launch in the second quarter of 2014 with an estimated price of $20,990, or $2,000 less than the GXR CVT currently on sale. Additionally, a more luxurious LE variant and a sportier R3 model will join the Prevé line-up later in 2014. The Prevé will also be offered with an all-new 2.0 litre turbocharged engine in early 2015.

Proton has sold 270 Prevé GX units in Australia for 2013. Beginning 2014, Proton has targeted 1% of Australia's small sedan segment with the updated Prevé range, which equates to around 74 sales per month.

=== Thailand ===
The Prevé has been met with critical acclaim in Thailand. Bangkok Post praised the pricing of the Prevé, where the author cited "In range-topping Premium form at 759,000 baht, not a single player in the Thai C-segment can match it for price." Manager Daily regarded the Prevé as a large improvement over Proton's previous offerings in many aspects, including design and build quality. The author went so far as to liken the turbocharged Prevé CFE to a Lotus Evora. Motortrivia pointed out Proton's confidence in the Prevé, citing the 5-year warranty and affordable pricing compared to its Thai-assembled Japanese counterparts. Thanathep Thanesniratsai of popular HeadLight Magazine applauded the Prevé and claimed it was on par with cars from European manufacturers in the ride and handling aspect.

=== Indonesia ===
The Proton Prevé has garnered overwhelming approval from critics in Indonesia. Automotive journalists from Dapurpacu, Okezone and various other Indonesian media representatives organised a test drive session on 27 June 2013, in which a convoy of five Proton Prevés were driven between Jakarta and Bandung via a mountain pass. The ride & handling, performance, safety standards, interior equipment, looks and pricing were well received by the critics. BeritaSatu shared similar views, placing extra emphasis on the relationship between Lotus and the Prevé.

Despite the warm welcome, only 7 Prevés were sold in Indonesia in the 14 days following its debut. Nonetheless, Proton Edar Indonesia regarded this as a positive response and was confident of achieving their sales target of 20 units per month. Due to the market circumstances, demand for MPVs far outweigh saloons in Indonesia, which account for just 1% of Total Industry Volume. Proton intends to capture 2% of this saloon segment, which would equate to a mere 200 to 220 units sold each year.

== Sales ==
Year	Malaysia (Note: Figures based on registration)
2012	17,987
2013	21,266
2014	12,095
2015	9,573
2016	4,067
2017	2,231
2018	3,039
2019	242
2020	11

== See also ==
- Proton Suprima S, the 5-door hatchback complement.

== Award ==
- Best Local Assembled Family Car - Asian Auto Allianz Auto Industry Awards 2012
- Value For Money Car of the Year (1.3L and above) - Frost & Sullivan 2013 Best Practices Award
- Debut Model of the Year - Frost & Sullivan 2013 Best Practices Award
- Best Adult Occupant Protection (AOP), Medium Family Car Category - ASEAN NCAP Grand Prix Awards 2014
- Value For Money Car of the Year (1.3L and above) - Frost & Sullivan 2014 Best Practices Award
- Most Affordable 5-Star Car in Thailand - ASEAN NCAP Grand Prix Awards 2016
