= Proton Suprima S =

Compact hatchback

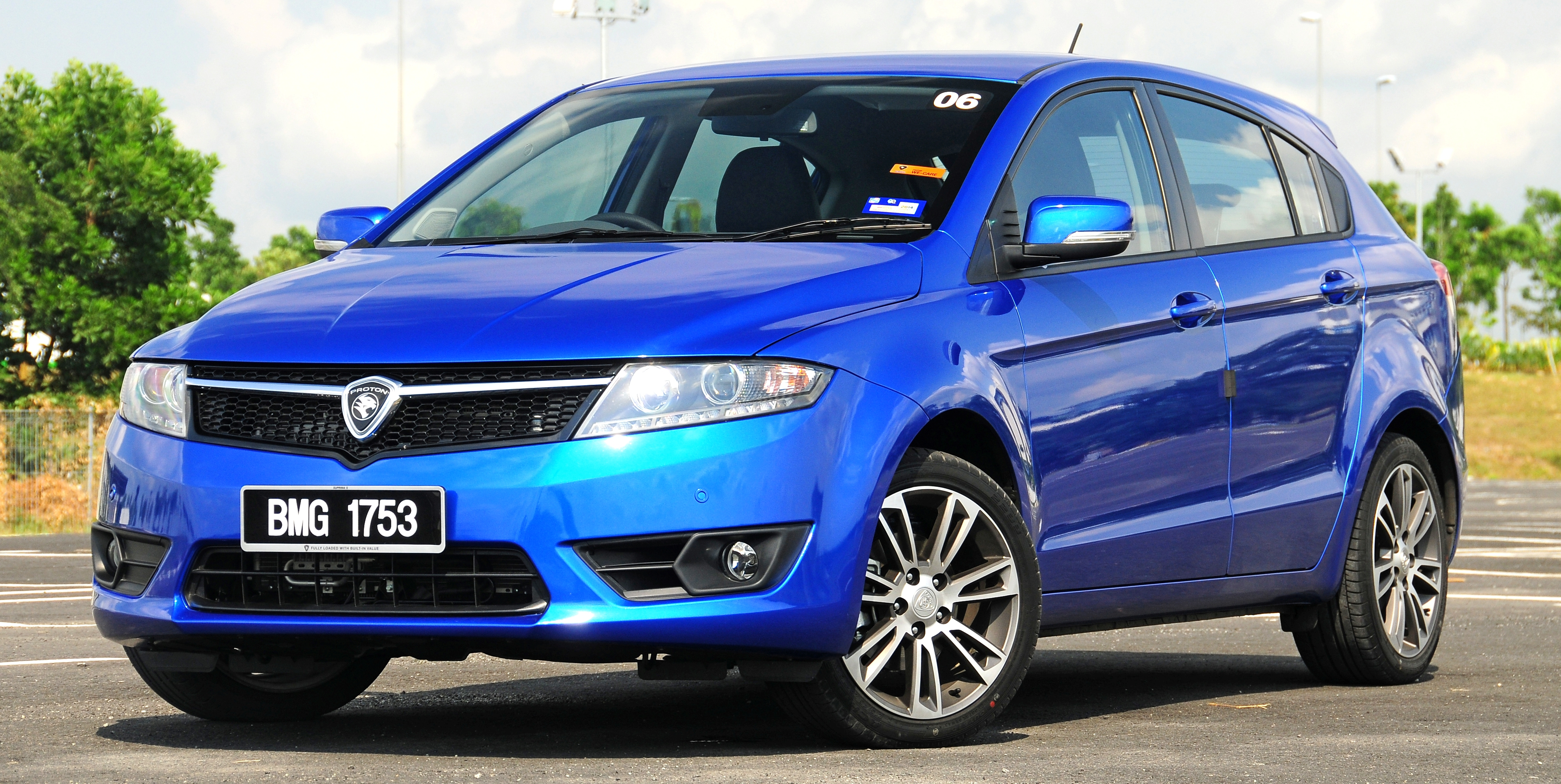

Overview
- Manufacturer: Proton
- Also called: Proton P3-22A
- Production: August 2013 – August 2019
- Assembly: Malaysia: Proton City, Perak (Tanjung Malim Plant)
- Designer: Italdesign Giugiaro S.p.A. Azlan Othman

Body and chassis
- Class: Compact car (C)
- Body style: 5-door hatchback
- Layout: Front-engine, front-wheel drive
- Platform: Proton P2
- Related: Proton Prevé

Powertrain
- Engine: 1.6 L CamPro Turbo DOHC I4
- Transmission: CVT manumatic

Dimensions
- Wheelbase: 2,650 mm (104.3 in)
- Length: 4,436 mm (174.6 in)
- Width: 1,786 mm (70.3 in)
- Height: 1,524 mm (60.0 in)
- Kerb weight: 1,375–1,395 kg (3,031–3,075 lb)

Chronology
- Predecessor: Proton Gen-2

The Proton Suprima S, codenamed P3-22A is a five-door compact hatchback engineered by Malaysian automobile manufacturer Proton. It was released on 17 August 2013 and is based on Proton's next generation P2 platform. The Suprima S complements the Proton Prevé saloon and has been designed with larger emphasis on international markets.

The name Suprima has its roots in the English word, Supreme. The S suffix stands for Sports.

== History ==
=== Pre-launch ===
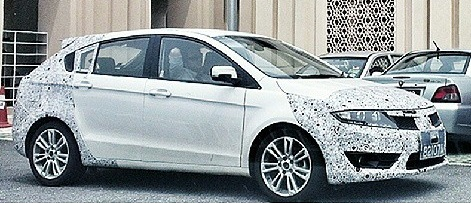
Proton P3-22A prototype with camouflage taping.

The Proton P3-22A has been in development alongside its sister car, the Proton Prevé, then code named Proton P3-21A since 2009. The first spyshot of a P3-22A prototype, taken on 14 December 2012 received high publicity from local online media. Although heavily masked, the prototype revealed that the majority of exterior panels and features with the exception of the area to the rear of the C-pillar have been carried over from the Prevé. 8 days later, another different prototype was sighted, revealing larger seven-spoke alloy rims, compared to the 16-inch ten-spoke alloy rims of the Prevé. Multiple P3-22A prototypes have since been spotted on Malaysian highways, all of which wore masking or camouflage tape. On the 4th of July, more spyshots went viral online and clearly showcased new features not offered in its sedan counterpart such as front parking sensors, additional interior speakers and a new dark blue paint colour option. The most revealing of all spyshots were taken on 30 July 2013 during the P3-22A's television commercial (TVC) shooting in the heart of Kuala Lumpur. In addition to the fully redesigned rear and aforementioned features, the photos clearly displayed a revised honeycomb front grille and foglight housings, brighter LED DRLs and a reverse camera. A couple of days later, a trailer was caught transporting several P3-22A production units, hinting at an imminent August 2013 launch.

On 14 August 2013, a spyshot of a P3-22A test drive unit confirmed the final product name, Proton Suprima S along with its tagline, Fully-loaded with built-in value. Proton had previously filed Proton Suprima for trademark status under the Intellectual Property Corporation of Malaysia (MyIPO) in January 2013. Proton Suprima was initially speculated to be the product name of the Proton Perdana Replacement Model, the company's upcoming D-segment luxury saloon. The full brochure of the Proton Suprima S was leaked online on 15 August 2013, approximately 2 days before its scheduled launch.

=== Post-launch ===
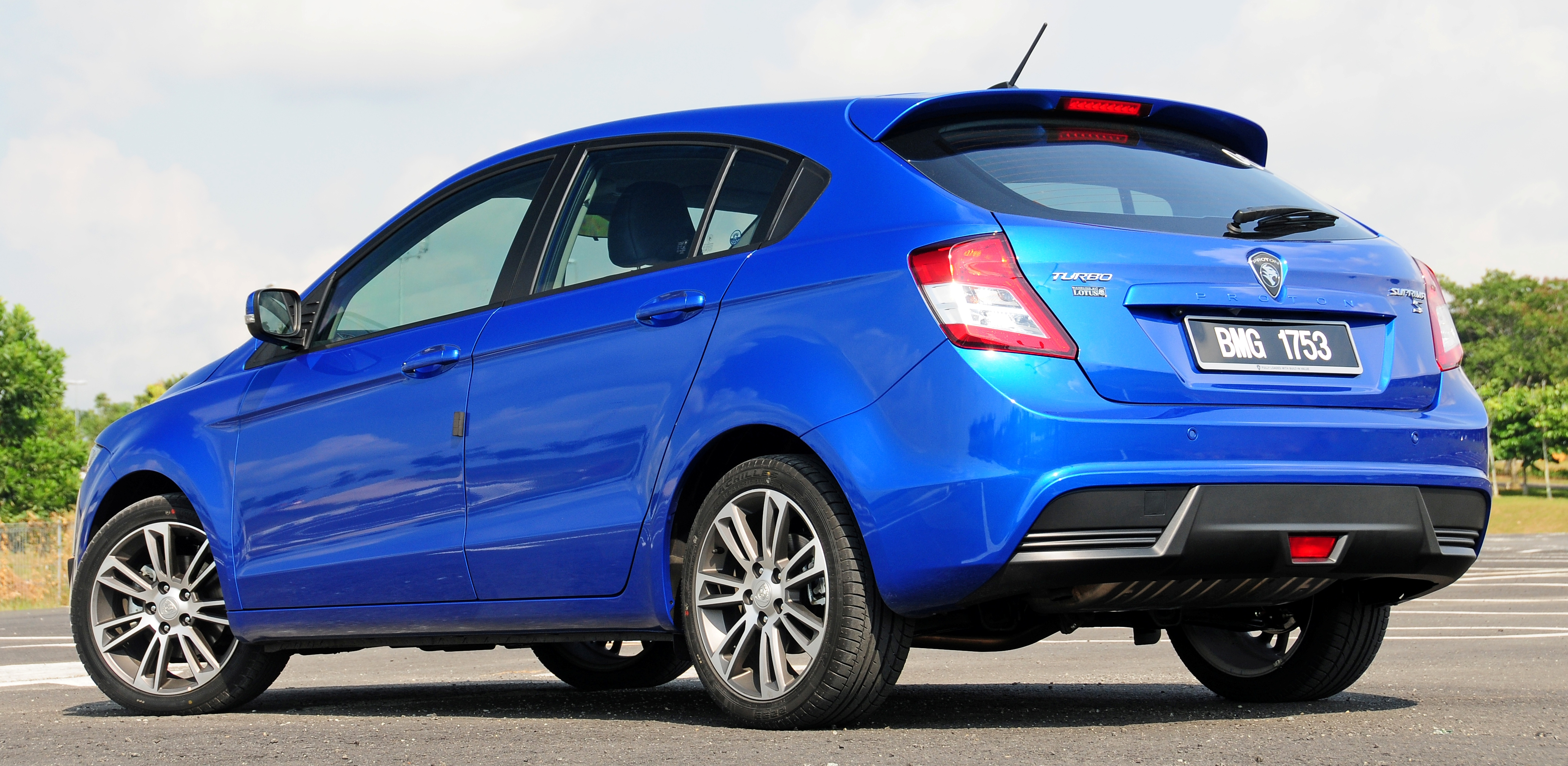
2013 Proton Suprima S in Malaysia.

The Proton Suprima S was finally unveiled on 17 August 2013 at two locations in Kuala Lumpur, the first being the VIP launch at the Matrade Exhibition & Convention Centre which was endorsed by the founder of Proton, Tun Dr. Mahathir Mohamad, and the second being the public launch at Pavilion KL. The VIP launch was covered in an exclusive live stream on YouTube by the popular Malaysian automotive news portal, paultan.org.

The Suprima S shares a large majority of its body panels and parts with the Prevé saloon, its sister car which launched approximately 16 months prior, on 16 April 2012. The Suprima comes in a choice of five colours and two trim variants, the Executive and Premium trims respectively. Both variants are powered by Proton's 1.6L CamPro Turbo engine, paired to a ProTronic CVT, Proton's version of a manumatic transmission. All Suprimas come standard with 6 SRS airbags, an Anti-lock Braking System (ABS) with Electronic Brakeforce Distribution (EBD), Brake Assist (BA), Traction Control (TCS) and Electronic Stability Control (ESC). Also standard is the Proton Infotainment System, an advanced Android OS-powered 7" LCD touchscreen GPS head unit with DVD, Bluetooth, USB, iPod & 4G WiFi compatibility. The Premium trim is equipped with exclusive kit such as Anthracite-shade leather seats, two tweeter speakers, front parking sensors, a reverse camera and brighter LED daytime running lamps (DRLs) in addition to features previously offered in the Prevé's Premium trim, namely the steering-mounted paddle shifters, automatic headlights and wipers, climate control, cruise control and push-start engine ignition. The Suprima S is priced between RM76,338 and RM79,988 respectively. Proton has since sold more than 835 Suprima S units between mid-August and the month of September.

On 30 October 2013, Proton unveiled the Suprima S Premium in Jakarta, Indonesia, the car's first export market. The launch comes approximately 4 1/2 months after the Prevé's Indonesian debut, and Proton Edar Indonesia targets sales of 150 Suprima units per year, compared with 240 for the Prevé. Proton Edar Indonesia sold 11 units of the Suprima on its launch date alone, more so than the Prevé which managed 7 units in the first two weeks. Another 4 Suprimas were sold in the month of November.

A couple of weeks later on 15 November 2013, Proton previewed the Suprima S GX and GXR at Sydney Harbour, Australia. Specifications for the GX automatic, priced at AUD$21,790 and the GXR automatic, AUD$26,590 reflect the Malaysian market Executive and Premium trims respectively. Additionally, a 6-speed manual transmission option has been confirmed for the Suprima S GX and GXR for the Australian market, priced at AUD$19,790 and AUD$24,990. The Suprima S is covered by Proton Cars Australia's '5-Star Service', and will officially go on sale beginning 1 January 2014, with the 6-speed manual variants slated for a later 2014 launch.

The Suprima S was launched in Bandar Seri Begawan, Brunei on 19 November 2013, approximately four days after its Australian premiere. It is available in a single high-end trim line which mirrors the Premium variant in Malaysia in terms of specifications. In addition, Bruneian Suprima S owners are entitled easy access to parts and services in neighbouring Sabah, Sarawak and Labuan as part of an agreement between the Proton distributors of Malaysia and Brunei, Proton Edar Sdn. Bhd. and United Motors Sdn. Bhd. respectively.

On 29 November 2013, Thailand became the fourth export market for the Suprima S upon its début at the 2013 Thailand International Motor Expo in Bangkok. Like Brunei and Indonesia, it's exclusively sold in the Premium guise, priced at 805,000 baht. The launch of the Suprima in Thailand comes approximately 12 months after the Prevé's Thai launch, and like its sister car, the Suprima has also been tuned to run on E20 fuel.

Proton introduced the Suprima S Super Premium on 18 January 2014, at the Proton Sales Carnival in Malacca, Malaysia. The Super Premium offers a new Race.Rally.Research. (R3) bodykit and seven-spoke 17-inch R3 alloy rims at an RM8,350 increment over the Premium variant. Apart from the new bodykit and rims, the Super Premium is mechanically identical to the Premium, and is only sold in two colours; Fire Red and Solid White respectively. The Super Premium effectively succeeds the Premium trim as the range-topping model in its domestic market.

On 6 December 2014, Proton introduced the Suprima S Standard, a new base model variant which undercuts the Suprima S Executive by as much as RM6,900. The Suprima S Standard loses some equipment and trim, including several safety features, and offers several new, albeit downgraded components to achieve its lower pricing. The omissions include several interior components like the Android OS-powered Proton Infotainment System in favour of the more basic head-unit from the Proton Prevé Executive variant, as well as the lack of steering audio switches, YES 4G internet connectivity, and the rear lid on the floor console between the two front seats. On the exterior, the Suprima S loses the front foglights, engine cover and the black tape on the B-pillar sashes. The Suprima S Standard is fitted with the ten-spoke alloy rims first seen on the Proton Prevé, and not the hubcaps from the Proton Exora Bold Standard CFE as speculated from spyshots several days prior to the launch. The most significant omissions in the Suprima S Standard are its safety features; it is only equipped with dual front airbags, ABS and EBD, and is not equipped with side and curtain airbags, electronic stability control (ESC), traction control (TCS) and brake assist (BA), which are all offered in the Suprima S Executive. The anti-trap feature in the front power windows, front reactive headrest, driver-side overhead handle grip and seat belt reminder for the front passenger have also been omitted. Nonetheless, the Suprima S Standard comes with a new Panther Grey finish for the front dashboard panels and front position lamps which are of the bulb type, instead of the L.E.D. type on the Executive trim. The rest of the specifications, including the powertrain were left largely unchanged, and the Proton Suprima S Standard is priced at RM69,438 and RM69,888 for the solid and metallic paint options respectively, both on-the-road prices with insurance. Proton hopes to triple sales of the Suprima S with this new base model.

The Proton Suprima S had a planned mid-2014 launch in the United Kingdom as well as a later 2014 launch in Turkey, Egypt, the GCC states and South Africa. Due to market circumstances, Malaysia will not be the lead market of the Suprima, as Proton only targets sales of just 750 units per month here. The Suprima has thus been primed for export where the majority of its sales will be derived from. Furthermore, a performance oriented R3 edition of the Suprima S has been confirmed by Proton's Deputy CEO. A masked Proton Suprima was also spotted on British roads in early September 2013. It bore the number plate AU13 FLW, where AU is the area code for Norwich, East Anglia. Additionally, ten Proton Suprima S units were formally registered with the DVLA in 2014, of which nine units were registered as 'Suprima S GLS CVT', with the sole remaining unit being a 'Suprima S GSX CVT'. The ten examples are presumed to be testing units owned by Proton Cars UK.

In the first half of 2018, the Executive trim was dropped and the Standard trim gained ESC in the Malaysian market. In the second half of 2018, the Standard trim was dropped.

Despite various spyshots, an updated Suprima S never materialised and finally in 2019, the Suprima S was removed from Proton's official website.

== Design ==
=== Exterior ===
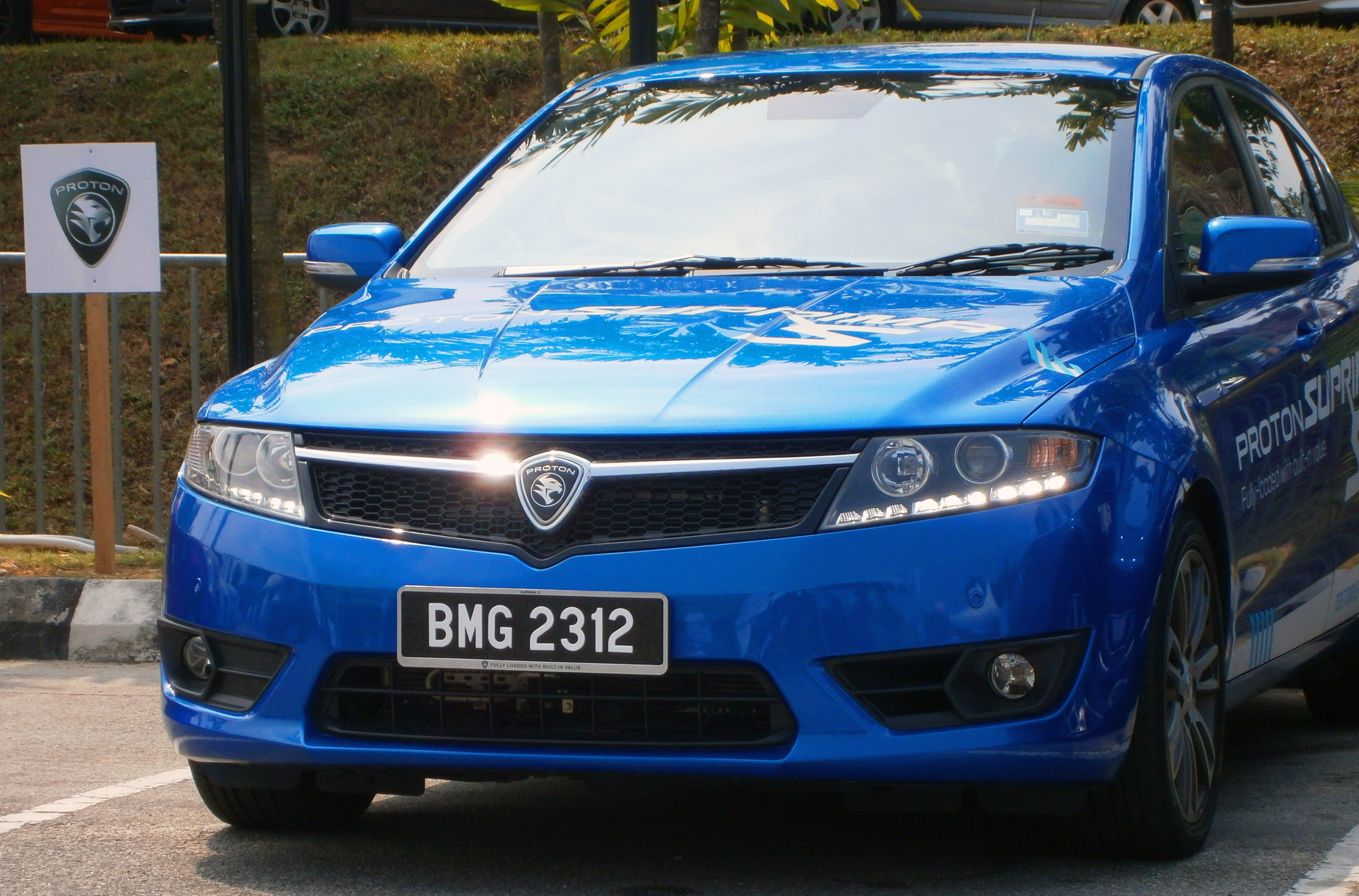
A Suprima S with LED daytime running lights (DRL) illuminated.

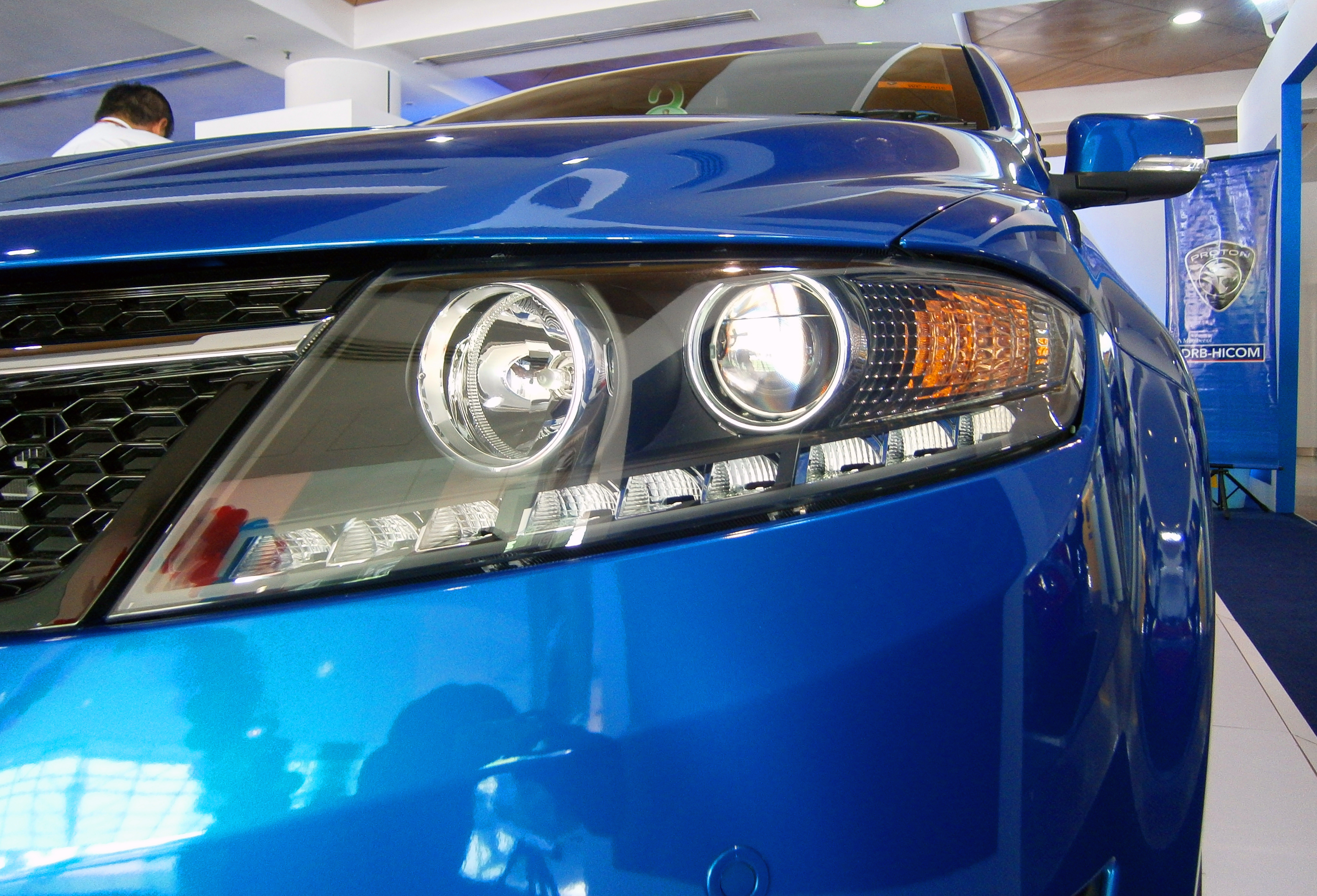
The headlights on the Suprima S are identical to those on the Prevé, bar the addition of LED DRLs.

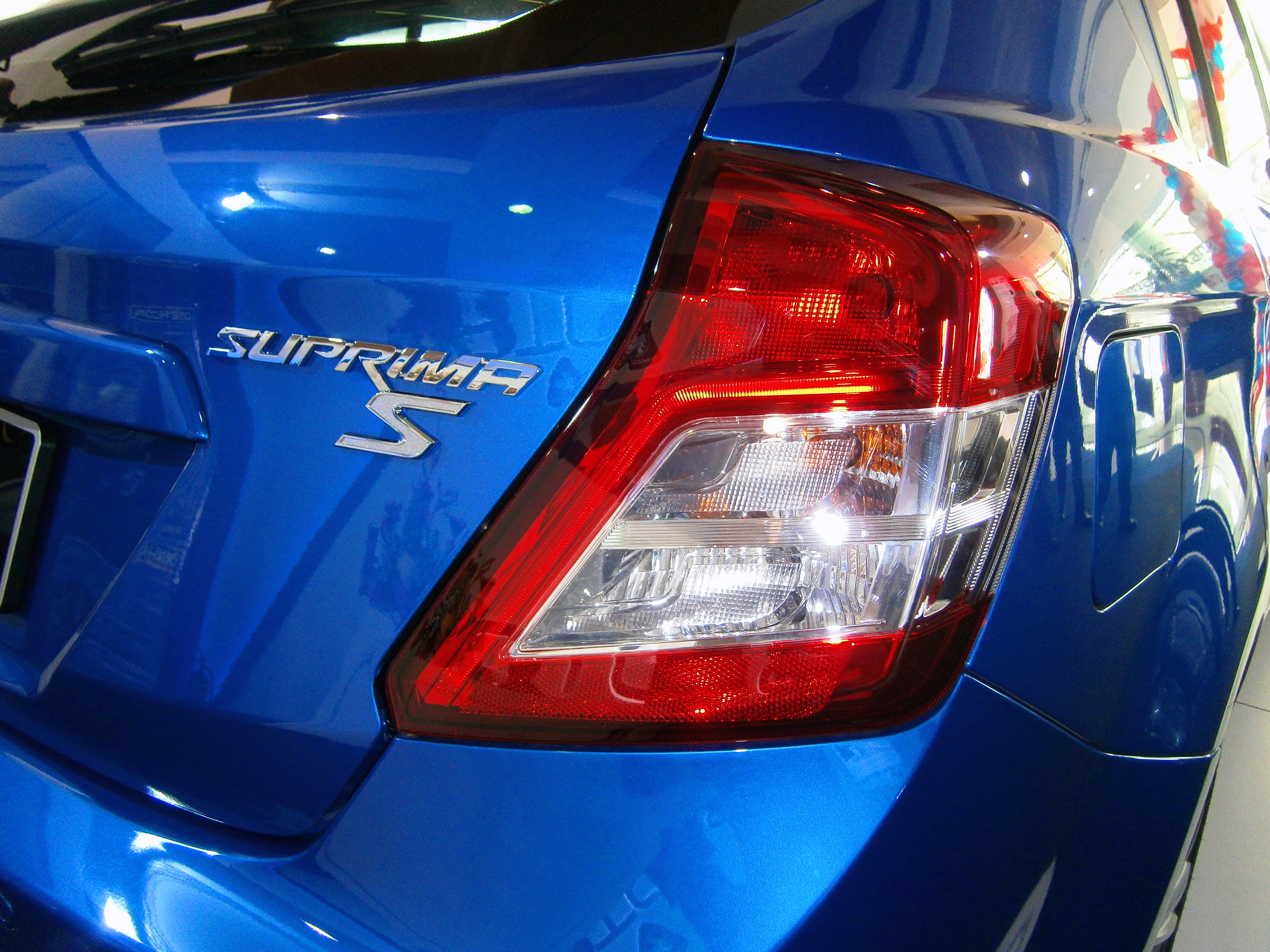
The rear lights on the Suprima S feature guide lights, a first for Proton.

The Proton Suprima S lends largely and improves upon the design cues first seen on its sister car, the Proton Prevé which launched 16 months prior, on 16 April 2012. Apart from the fully redesigned rear, the Suprima is almost identical to the Prevé in terms of its exterior design, bar the new diamond-cut seven-spoke alloy rims (17" and 16" on the Premium and Executive trims respectively), revised Proton Wings front grille, front air intake and foglight inserts. The Suprima was designed with more emphasis on sportiness in an effort to appeal to a younger audience. The styling was done by the PROTON Design team headed by Chief Designer Azlan Othman in Shah Alam, Malaysia.

Proton had previously collaborated with Italy-based Italdesign Giugiaro S.p.A. for the styling and likeness of the Prevé, which ultimately trickled down into the Suprima as well. The Prevé and to an extent, the Suprima was developed by an international consortium consisting of experts from Malaysia, Italy, France, Germany and South Korea. Additionally, several components of the car are also sourced from Japan, South Korea, Australia and Europe.

The Suprima is the second Malaysian-made car to be factory-fitted with LED position lamps and the first to be offered with LED Daytime running lights (DRL). The LEDs built into the projector headlights on the Suprima Executive trim are identical to those of the Prevé, whereas those on the Suprima Premium variant are true LED DRLs. The LED DRLs may improve the visual appeal of the Suprima, but more importantly help in improving road safety by increasing the conspicuity of the car during daylight conditions. The inclusion of daytime running lights on passenger cars are not compulsory in Malaysia, but they are mandatory equipment for all passenger cars marketed in European Union member states as of 7 February 2011 under the EU Directive 2008/89/EC. The Suprima also features a rear fog lamp which is mounted centrally on the rear diffuser, bringing the car up to ECE R38 compliance. Additionally, the rear lights on the Suprima feature guide lights, another first for Proton. The side view mirrors which sport built-in LED turn signal lights have remained physically unchanged over the Prevé's. However, both mirrors now fold and unfold automatically in the Premium trim, whereas in the Executive line, manual user input is required, though both mirrors are still fully electric in nature.

=== Interior ===
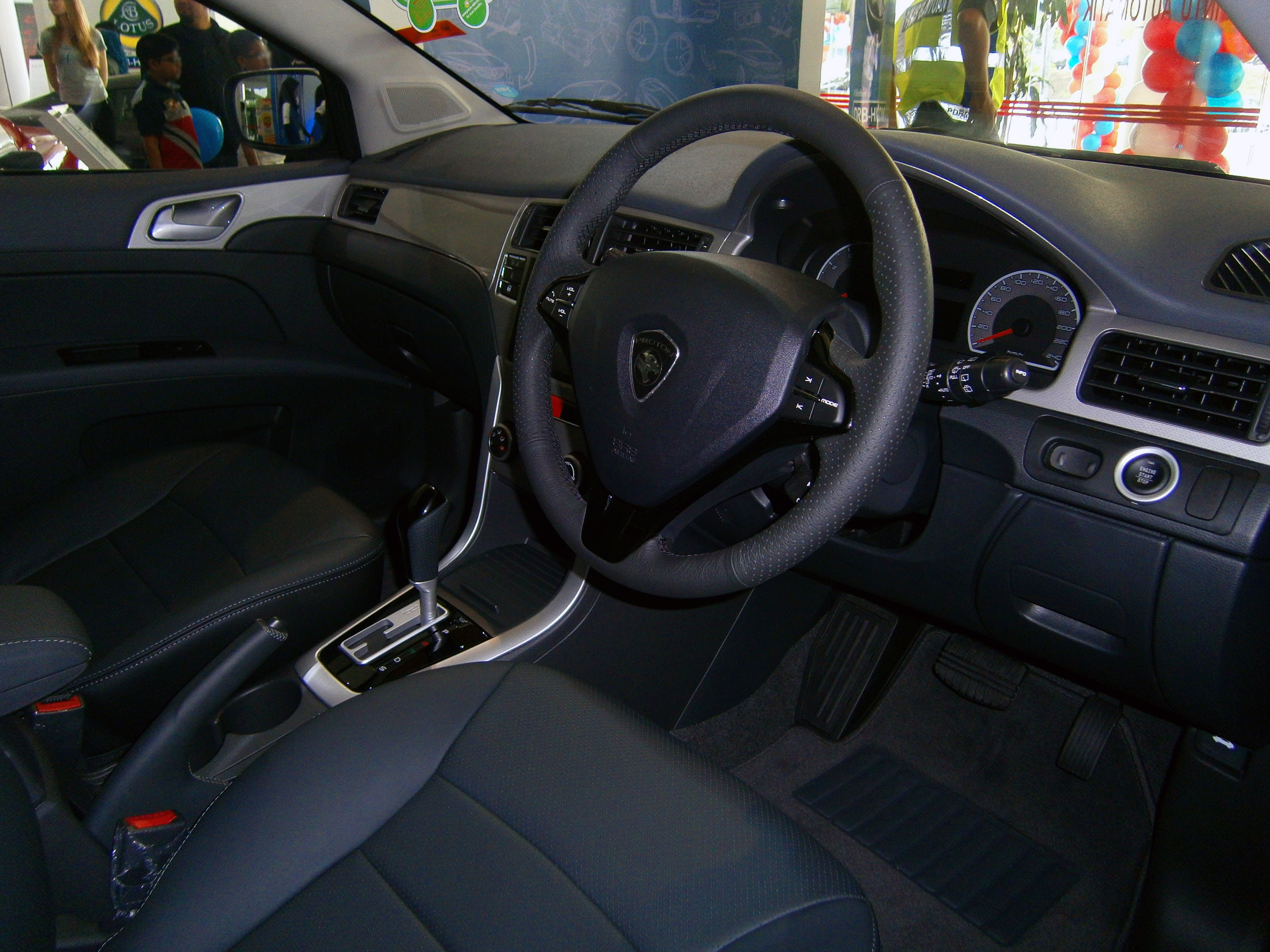
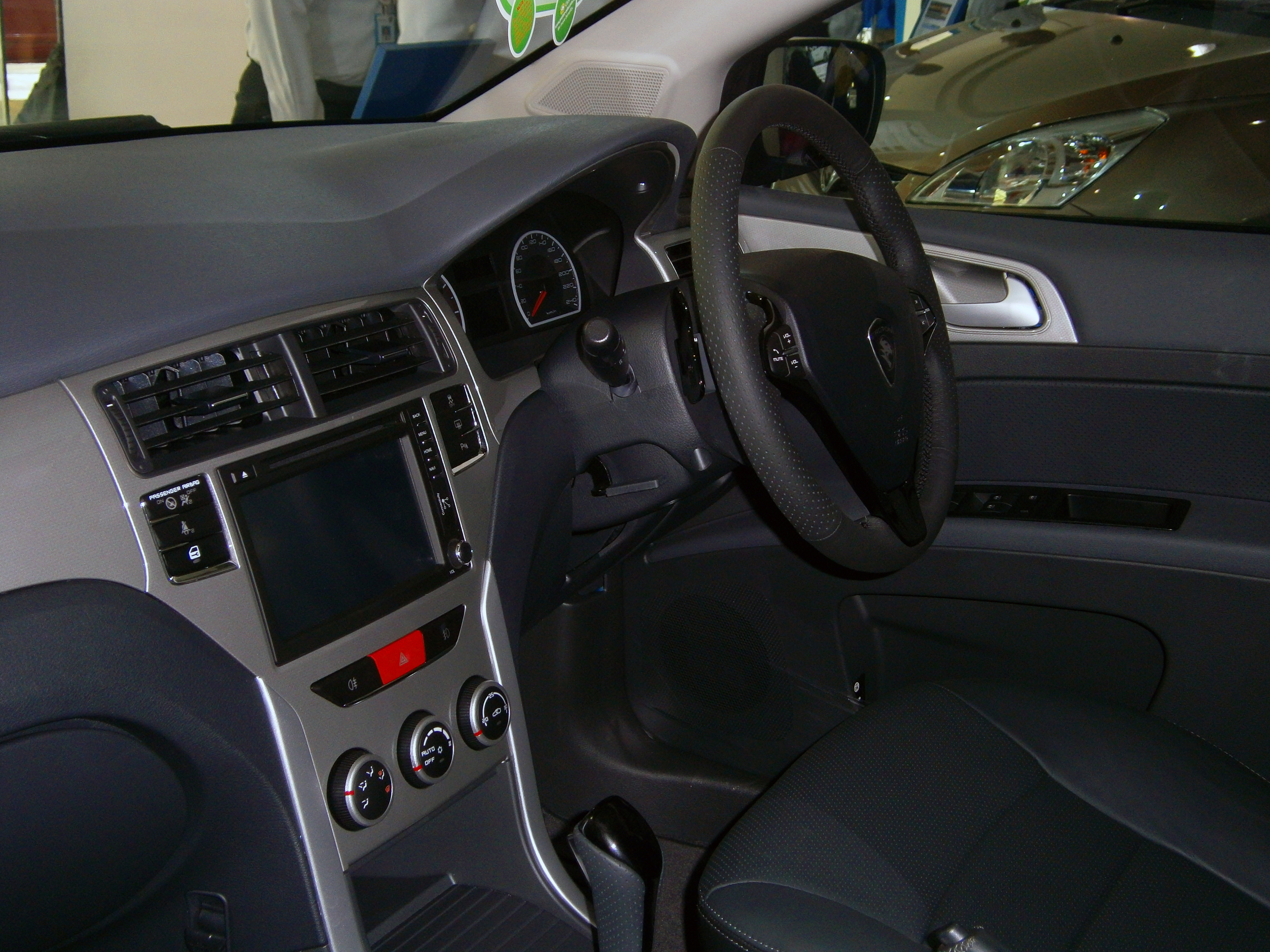
The interior of the Suprima S Premium / GXR.with an Android-based touchscreen unit.

The interior of the Suprima has remained largely unchanged when compared to the Prevé's. Nonetheless, several improvements were made which contributed to an overall increase in the Suprima's visual and ergonomic appeal. The new Proton Infotainment System, equipped standard in all Suprimas is an advanced Android OS-powered 7" LCD touchscreen head unit which doubles as a GPS/SatNav system, DVD player and in-car web browser. The system also has Bluetooth, USB, iPod and WiFi compatibility. However, the user can only browse the internet, access YouTube, watch DVDs and play Android-based games when the handbrake is engaged, as a safety precaution. Audio output is channelled to four speakers in the Executive trim, but the Premium trim offers an additional two A-pillar mounted tweeters, bringing the grand total up to six speakers. The whole system is connected to the internet over a WiMAX network under an agreement between Proton and the Malaysian ISP, Yes 4G. A WiFi dongle provided with the Suprima is used to set up a wireless local area network (WLAN) within the car itself, thus offering on-the-go broadband with coverage in all major Malaysian cities and towns as well as across the Malaysian Expressway System, with download speeds of up to 20 Mbit/s. However, the broadband services may cease if the car is driven into areas without Yes 4G coverage, or into neighbouring Singapore or Thailand. Nonetheless, Proton has made up for this with the ability to divert or bridge an internet connection using a smartphone or another portable hotspot instead. Furthermore, the built-in GPS system does not require an internet connection to function, as it operates independently over Telekom Malaysia's Lokatoo service. The Suprima is the third Proton car to offer internet based services, the first being a limited edition of the Proton Inspira, and the second being its sister car, the Prevé.

The Premium variant of the Suprima comes with exclusive interior kit not offered in the Executive trim, in particular the Anthracite-shade leather seats, front parking sensors and a built-in reverse camera. It also receives several features previously offered in the Prevé's Premium trim, namely the steering-mounted paddle shifters, automatic headlights and wipers, climate control, cruise control and push-start engine ignition.

== Safety ==
Safety features (Note: Legend Blue : Standard across all trim levels. Green : Available on selected trim level(s) only, full package. Yellow : Available on selected trim level(s) only, but is not the full package. Red : Not available on selected trim level(s), or is the no-frills package.)
| Trim Variant | Standard (2013-2017) | Standard (2018) | Executive/GX | | Premium/GXR | | | | | SP |
|---|---|---|---|---|---|---|---|---|---|---|
| Market | (Malaysia) | (Malaysia) | (Malaysia) | (Australia) | (Malaysia) | (Indonesia) | (Thailand) | (Brunei) | (Australia) | (Malaysia) |
| ABS with EBD | ✔ | | | | | | | | | |
| BA, TCS and ESC | ✘ | ✔ | ✔ | ✔ | ✔ | ✔ | | | | ✔ |
| Airbags | 2 | 2 | 6 | 6 | 6 | 6 | | | | 6 |

- (Australia) / (New Zealand) - ANCAP -
- (United Kingdom) - MIRA -
- (Malaysia) - MyVAP -

The Suprima S became the second Proton car after the Prevé to claim the full 5-Star safety rating of the Australasian New Car Assessment Program (ANCAP) of Australia and New Zealand. The Suprima has not been officially crash tested by the ANCAP, but it has been thoroughly crash tested and assessed by the MIRA of the United Kingdom, an independent organisation which is recognised by the ANCAP. The Malaysian Vehicle Assessment Programme (MyVAP) of the Malaysian Institute of Road Safety Research (MIROS) had previously rated the Malaysian Domestic Market (MDM) Prevé five-stars, but has yet to officially assess the Suprima. However, the Suprima offers curtain airbags on top of all the safety equipment previously offered in the MDM Prevé, effectively making the Suprima safer than its sister car and thus deserving of the five-star rating as well.

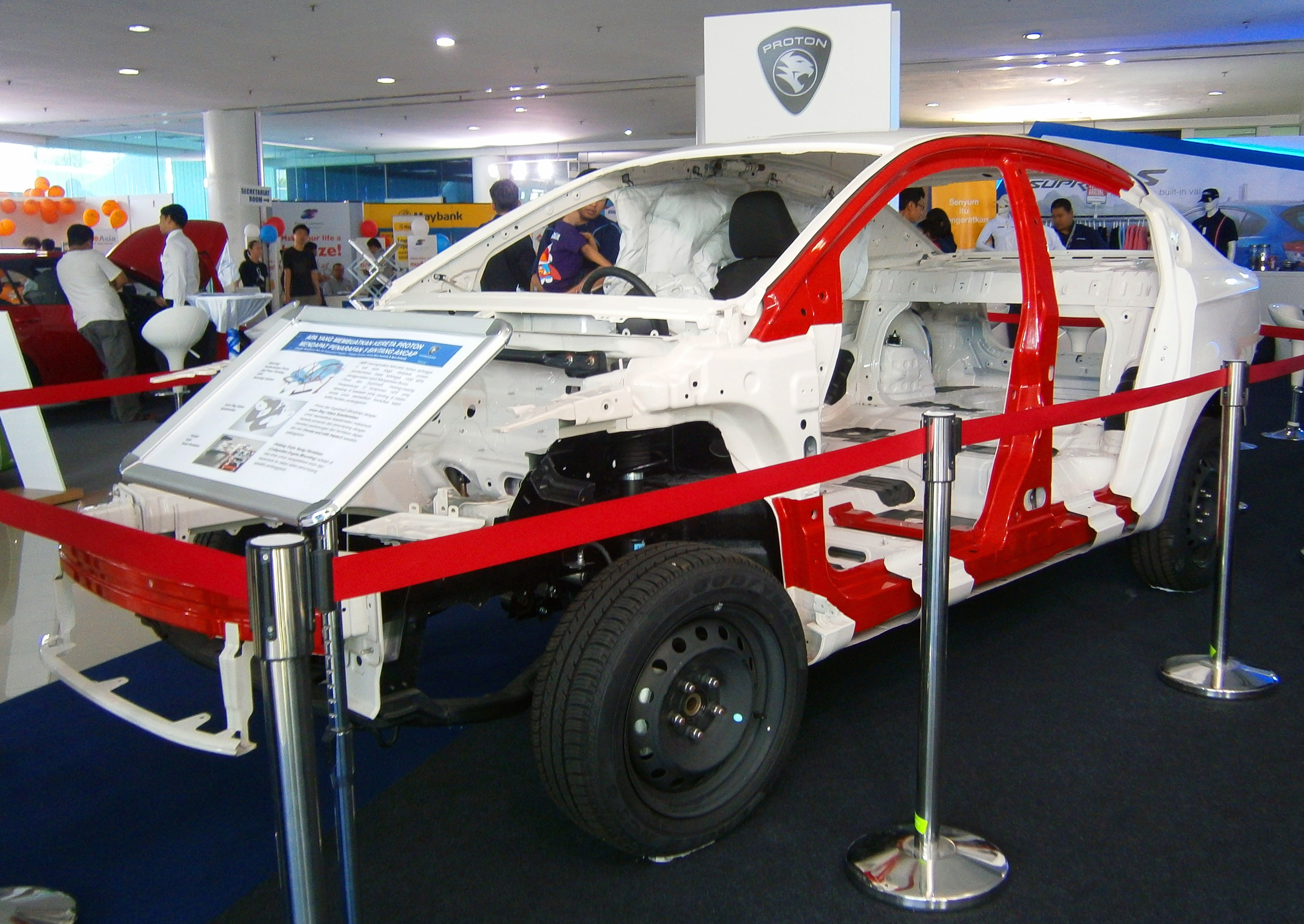
The Reinforced Safety Structure (RESS) was developed specifically for the Prevé & Suprima S duo.

Like the Prevé, the Suprima S has also been developed to house a maximum of 6 SRS airbags, an Anti-lock Braking System (ABS) with Electronic Brakeforce Distribution (EBD), Brake Assist (BA), Traction Control (TCS) and Electronic Stability Control (ESC). However, unlike the Prevé, all Suprima units came standard with all of its engineered safety features at launch, whereas the MDM Prevé Premium trim was only offered with a maximum of 4 airbags with all electronic safety equipment, and the MDM Prevé Executive trim models were only fitted with 2 airbags without BA, TCS & ESC at launch. However, the MDM Prevé has since been updated for the 2014 model year and currently offers all of its engineered safety features as standard across all trim variants, without a hike in pricing. Additionally, the Suprima Premium variant offers front parking sensors, a reverse camera, Hill-Hold Assist, an Electronic Gear Shift Lock and brighter LED daytime running lights (DRL) which help contribute to an overall increase in safety standards.

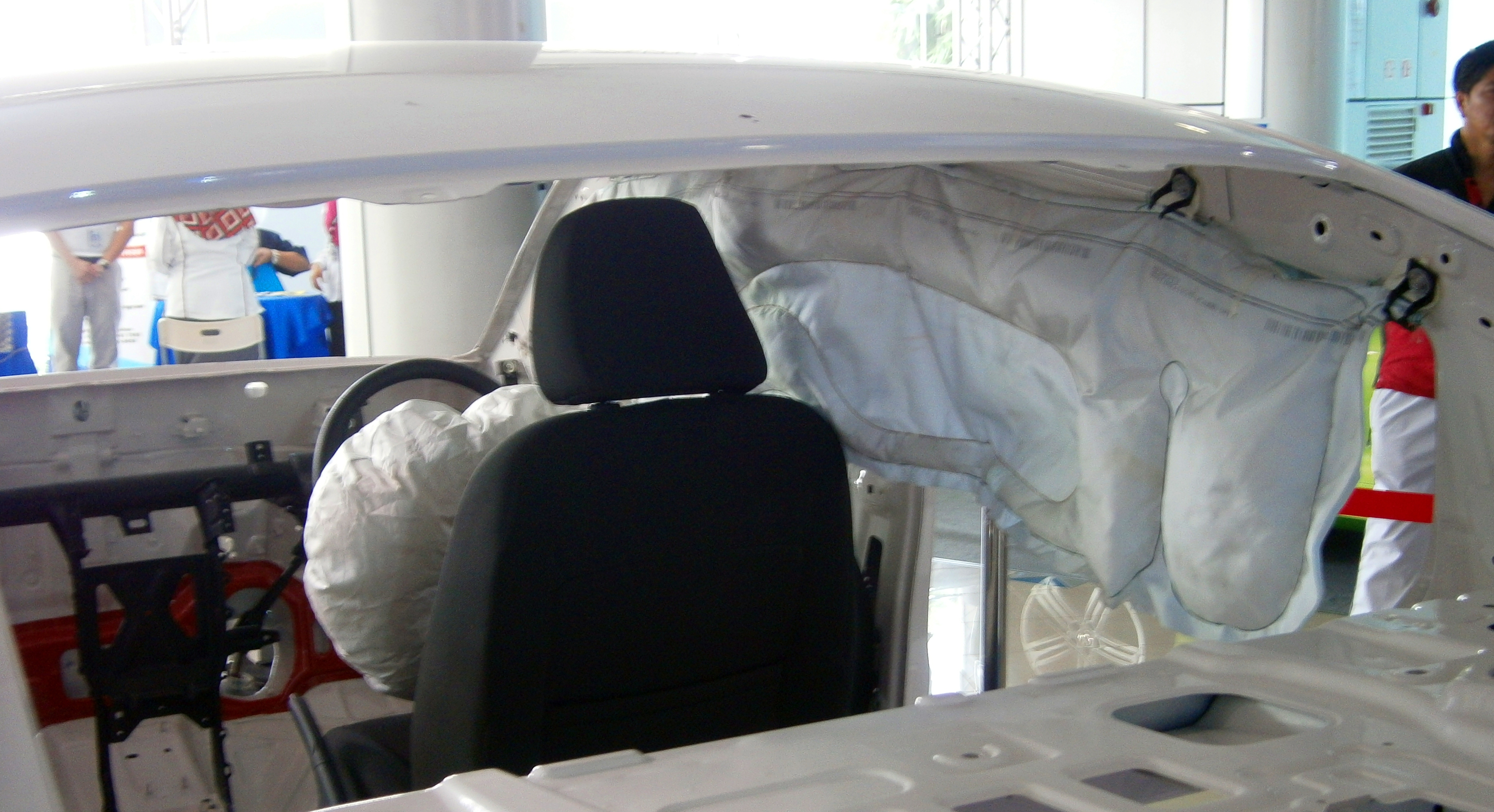
The RESS frame may encompass up to 6 SRS airbags; dual front, dual side and full-length curtain airbags respectively.

Prior to the launch of the Suprima S and Prevé duo, Proton cars suffered from a poor safety reputation. The Proton Jumbuck infamously scored one star out of a potential five in its ANCAP test in 2009. Proton responded by raising safety standards significantly during the development of the Prevé and Suprima S. The REinforced Safety Structure (RESS) frame was developed specifically for the duo. Proton employs the use of Hot Press Forming (HPF), a process which was pioneered in Germany, during the Prevé's and Suprima's manufacturing stage. Twelve HPF components help in the reinforcement of the passenger compartment for improved occupant safety. The result is an increased tensile strength and torsional body rigidity of 19,000 Nm/degree. The usage of HPF in the manufacturing process also helps in weight-saving, which translates into improved fuel efficiency, handling and performance. Proton is the only Original Equipment Manufacturer (OEM) in South East Asia to use Hot Press Forming in their manufacturing processes.

As of January 2014, Proton has prioritised safety as one of their main unique selling propositions (USP) and has been aggressively promoting their achievements with the Prevé and Suprima S. The company has promised that all new Protons launched from 2014 onwards will come with extensive safety equipment and feature a 5-Star ANCAP rating.

Despite Proton's prioritisation of high safety standards in their new models, the company recently introduced a new base model variant for the Suprima S on 6 December 2014, which had a large amount of safety features omitted in favour of reduced pricing.

The Suprima S borrows most of its ride & handling attributes from the Prevé, which was tested in various weather and road conditions during its development phase such as ice & snow in Sweden as well as intense heat in Spain. The suspension system consists of MacPherson struts for the front and a multi-link with stabiliser bar for the rear. The suspension setup, the result of a retune of the Prevé's was wholly done in-house by the local Ride & Handling team, and was subsequently approved by Proton's British sister company, Lotus during a short joint-test with the testing team. Unlike the Prevé, the Suprima S displays a Lotus Ride & Handling badge on the bootlid, whereas in the former, no such badging is offered, but Proton Ride & Handling is nonetheless used in the Prevé's promotional media.

ANCAP test results* Proton Suprima S (2013)
| Test | Score |
|---|---|
| Overall | 5 /5 stars |
| Frontal offset | 14.53/16 |
| Side impact | 15.72/16 |
| Pole | 2/2 |
| Seat belt reminders | 2/3 |
| Whiplash protection | Good |
| Pedestrian protection | Marginal |
| Electronic stability control | Standard |

== Powertrains ==
Manufacturer's claims.
| Engine | CamPro Turbo |
|---|---|
| Format | I4 DOHC 16V turbo |
| Total displacement (cc) | 1,561 |
| Bore x Stroke (mm x mm) | 76.0 x 86.0 |
| Maximum Output [hp(kW)/rpm] | 138 (103) / 5,000 |
| Maximum Torque (Nm/rpm) | 205 / 2,000 ~ 4,000 |
| Maximum Speed (km/h) | 190 (CVT-MN) |
| Acceleration 0–100 km/h (sec) | 9.9 (CVT-MN) |
| Fuel tank capacity (litres) | 50 |

The Proton Suprima S is only offered with the 1.6 litre CamPro Turbo I4 petrol engine which has been indigenously designed by Proton and Lotus. The CamPro Turbo was previously known as the CamPro CFE, in which CFE stood for Charged Fuel Efficiency. Proton opted to rename the engine in favour of clarity & conciseness. The CamPro Turbo incorporates a low-pressure intercooled turbocharger that delivers 138 horsepower (103 kW) at 5,000 rpm and 205 Nm of torque between 2,000 and 4,000 rpm. Proton claims the turbocharged 1.6 litre CamPro Turbo is equivalent to a naturally aspirated 2.0 litre engine, and it has also been designed to conform to Euro V emission standards. The CamPro Turbo in the Suprima is mated to the Belgian-made Punch Powertrain VT3+ CVT, also known as ProTronic, Proton's version of a manumatic transmission. The VT3+ transmission has been refined and revised to offer a sportier and more spirited driving experience. The CamPro Turbo and VT3 CVT were first used in the 2011 Proton Exora Bold and 2012 Proton Prevé Premium respectively.

Proton is currently developing an all-new 2.0-litre turbocharged engine for the Prevé and Suprima S duo. A six-speed manual transmission option is also in development.

== Reception ==
Proton Suprima S sales & production between 2013 and Q2 2016
| Country | Total | Q2 2016 | Q1 2016 | 2015 | 2014 | 2013 |
|---|---|---|---|---|---|---|
| Malaysia | | 56 | 54 | 914 | | 2,000+ |
| Indonesia | 621 | 1 | 11 | 71 | 458 | 80 |
| Thailand | 226 | 0 | 2 | 8 | 197 | 19 |
| Australia | 125 | 9 | 7 | 44 | 62 | 3 |
| Brunei | | | | | | |
| Mauritius | | | | | | |
| Total global sales | | | | | | 2,100+ |
| Total produced | 6,967 | 12 | 36 | 1,918 | 712 | 4,289 |
Notes: Q1 2016 applies for the months of January, February & March 2016 respectively. Q2 2016 applies for the months of April, May & June 2016 respectively. Total applies for units sold in the specified country between sales inception and June 2016 respectively. Total global sales applies for combined units sold in all active markets. Total produced applies for all units produced between July 2013 and June 2016 respectively.

=== Malaysia ===
On 28 August 2013, the Proton Suprima S received its first comprehensive review from Hafriz Shah of the popular Malaysian automotive news portal, paultan.org. It was generally well-received, more so than its sister car, the Prevé which launched 16 months prior. Hafriz commended the looks, improved NVH properties and its value for money proposition. However, the author specifically singled out the refined VT3+ drivetrain as the Suprima's most improved-upon feature which, paired together with the already excellent ride & handling first seen in the Prevé, contributed to a sportier and more spirited driving experience, all without upsetting the balance between handling performance and driving comfort. Nonetheless, several aspects of the car were less well-received, including the slightly flawed head unit, disproportionate driving position, build quality and top-end refinement. In Hafriz's words, “Proton can now compete realistically without leaning too heavily on price advantage alone. It's just up to you to believe that it can.” Daniel Wong from Live Life Drive echoed similar sentiments, but placed extra emphasis on the improved ride & handling and questionable quality control. In Daniel's words, “Engineering-wise, Proton should be proud of the Suprima S, it is a better car in most respects than the Prevé, I just wish they built them better.”

== Sales ==
| Year | Malaysia (Note: Figures based on registration) |
|---|---|
| 2013 | 1,579 |
| 2014 | 2,663 |
| 2015 | 1,171 |
| 2016 | 953 |
| 2017 | 477 |
| 2018 | 324 |
| 2019 | 5 |

== See also ==
- Proton Prevé, the 4-door saloon complement.

== Awards ==
- People's Choice Award 2013 (NST-Maybank Car Of The Year Awards 2014)
