= Proton RESS =

Automotive safety body construction system

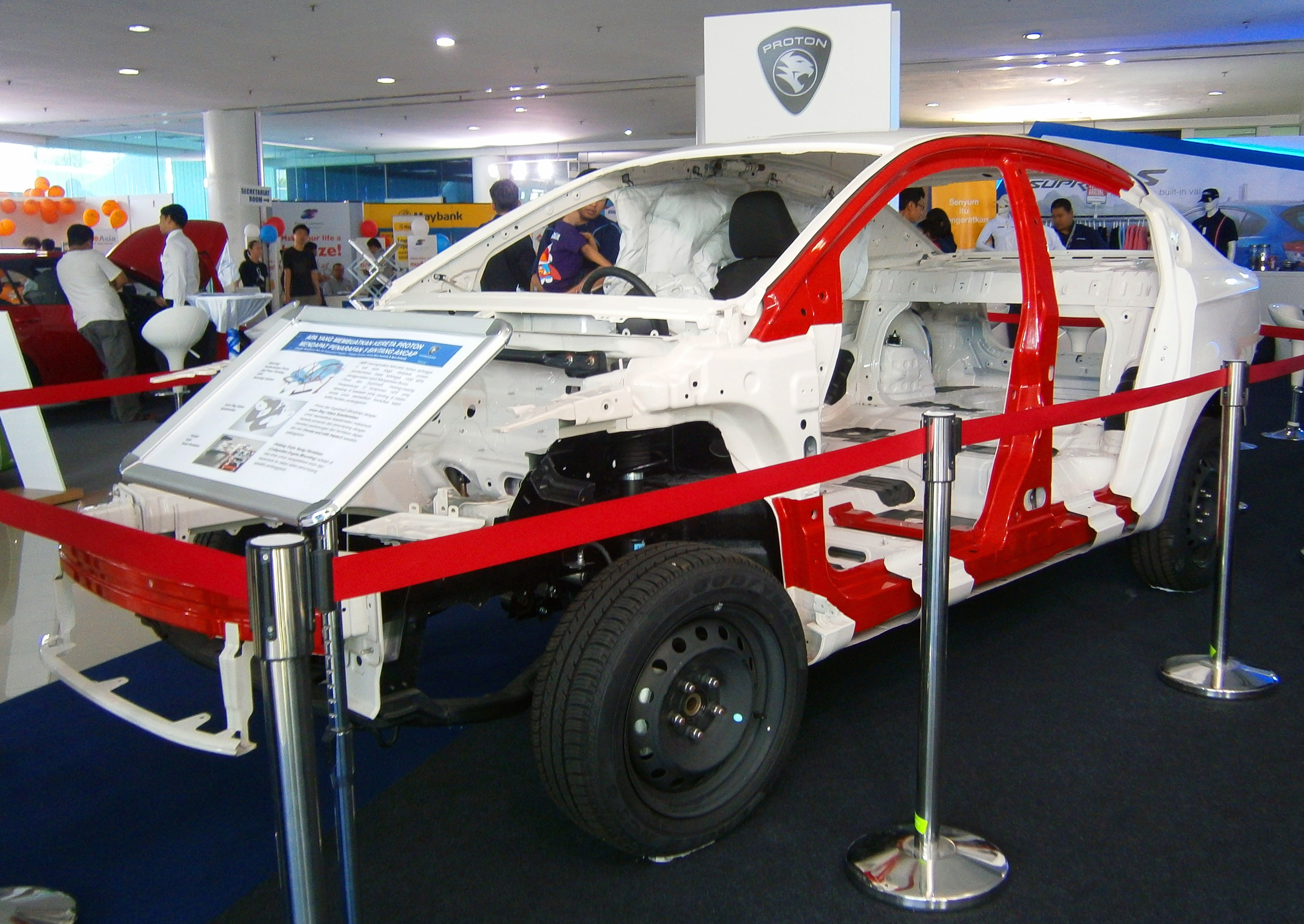
The Reinforced Safety Structure (RESS) helped the Prevé score 34.25 points out of 37 in its ANCAP crash test

Reinforced Safety Structure (RESS) is the brand name of an automotive safety body construction system by the Malaysian carmaker, Proton. Debuting in 2012 with the Proton Preve, the RESS was developed to meet tougher global crash safety regulations through the application of heat treatment and hot press forming (HPF) technology.

== Overview ==
Prior to the launch of the Prevé and Suprima S, Proton cars suffered from poor safety ratings, with the Proton Jumbuck scoring one out of five stars in its 2009 ANCAP safety rating. The Waja was the first and thus far only Proton car to be officially crash tested by the Euro NCAP in 2002, where it scored three out of five stars. The Proton Exora was the only pre-2012 car model that scored four stars in both ANCAP and Malaysia's own MyVAP (Malaysian Vehicle Assessment Program).

To develop the RESS, Proton acquired Hot Press Forming (HPF) technology, making it the first carmaker in the ASEAN region and the sixth in the world to acquire Hot Press Forming technology. In the HPF technology, steel pieces are heated to 900°C before they are stamped into shape and quenched at 4°C, converting the steel from austenite to martensite. The process increases the strength of steel parts from the original 500 MPa to 1,500 MPa.

In the RESS frame, the structure is reinforced by applying the parts made from the HPF process to the main cabin structure to make the cabin more rigid. There are nine major structural parts that are made from the HPF process, namely:

1. Reinforcement Front Pillar Upper LH/RH
2. Reinforcement Centre Pillar Inner LH/RH
3. Reinforcement Centre Pillar Outer LH/RH
4. Reinforcement Side Sill LH/RH
5. Reinforcement Front Pillar Inner Lower LH/RH
6. Panel Front Pillar Inner Upper LH/RH
7. Front Impact Beam
8. Reinforcement Crossmember Dash Lower RH
9. Crossmember Front Floor Rear LH/RH

Proton car models with RESS body structure that have scored the maximum five-stars in both the ANCAP and ASEAN NCAP include the 2012 Preve, the 2013 Proton Suprima S, the 2014 Iriz, and the 2016 Persona.

== See also ==
- Proton Prevé - the first model with RESS body structure
- Proton Suprima S
- Proton Iriz
- Proton Persona
