= Chery A3 =

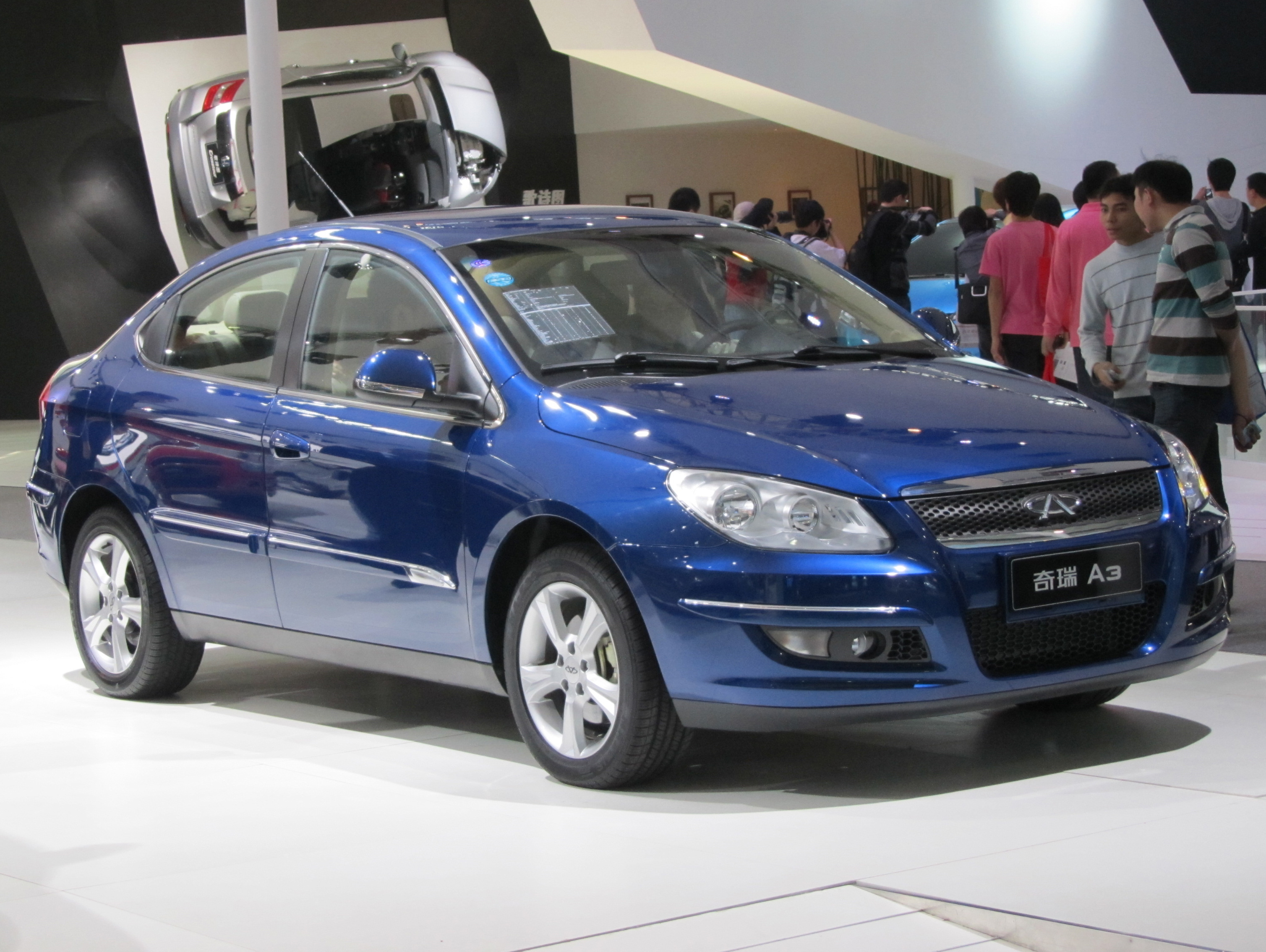
- Chery A3 4-door sedan

Overview
- Manufacturer: Chery
- Also called: Chery J3; Chery M11; Chery Apola; Chery Chance/Niche; Chery Cielo; Chery Tengo; Chery Skin/Skin Sport; Chery Orinoco; Speranza M11/M12; Chery Cruise
- Production: 2008–2015
- Assembly: Wuhu, Anhui, China; Taichung, Taiwan; Cairo, Egypt (Speranza); Aragua, Venezuela; Warsaw, Poland (FSO)
- Designer: Goran Popović at Pininfarina

Body and chassis
- Class: Compact car
- Body style: 4-door sedan 5-door hatchback
- Layout: Front-engine, front-wheel-drive
- Platform: Chery M1X

Powertrain
- Engine: petrol: 1.6 L SQR481F I4; 1.6 L EG416 I4; 1.8 L SQR481FC I4; 2.0 L SQR484F I4
- Transmission: 5-speed manual 4-speed automatic

Dimensions
- Wheelbase: 2,550 mm (100.4 in)
- Length: 4,352 mm (171.3 in) (sedan); 4,282 mm (168.6 in) (hatchback)
- Width: 1,794 mm (70.6 in) (sedan); 1,792 mm (70.6 in) (hatchback)
- Height: 1,464 mm (57.6 in) (sedan); 1,467 mm (57.8 in) (hatchback)
- Curb weight: 1,355 kg (2,987 lb); 1,395 kg (3,075 lb)

Chronology
- Successor: Chery Arrizo 7

The Chery A3 is a compact car built by the Chinese manufacturer Chery between 2008–2015, offered as a 4-door sedan and as a 5-door hatchback. It was revealed for the first time as a concept car at the 2006 Beijing Motor Show and production car two years later which went on sale in September 2008. The car was designed by the Italian studio Pininfarina.

In South America, Eastern Europe and Oceania it is marketed numerous different names, including: Chery M11 (in Ukraine and Russia), Chery Tengo (in Serbia and nearby countries), Chery Chance/Niche (in Turkey), Chery Cielo (in Brazil), Chery Skin/Skin Sport (in Chile), Chery Orinoco (in Venezuela), Chery Cruise (in Indonesia) and Chery J3 (in Australia and New Zealand).

== Safety and equipment ==
The car comes in standard with driver and front passenger airbags and additionally it can offer side airbags and as well front and rear curtain airbags. Also standard equipment includes ABS and EBD and optional there is TCS. The body structure is made 40% of high strength steel sheet. Standard equipment also includes power steering, electric windows, air conditioning, 205/55 R16 tyres with aluminium alloy rims, remote central locking or cd/mp3-player.

In December 2008, A3 received a five-star China-NCAP safety rating, becoming the first indigenous car to achieve such a high-test rating. The process consists in three different tests; 100% front crash test with a wall (like the U.S. National Highway Traffic Safety Administration (NHTSA) test), a 40% offset test (like the EuroNCAP) and a side crash test like the EuroNCAP.

The results of the A3 were 11,22 points in the 100% frontal crash test, 15.03 points in the 40% offset crash test and 16 points in the side crash test. Another Chinese car that received five stars in the testings was the Roewe 550.

== Reception ==
The Chery A3 is regarded as "a turning point for the Chinese automotive industry" for its understated yet original design, when at its release many Chinese cars used designs heavily borrowing from established foreign brands.

== Europe ==
Rumors were raised in December 2010 that the car was about to be built at the struggling FSO plant in Poland, when a Chery A3 was spotted coming out of the factory's gates in Warsaw and bearing a label marked with the FSO logo in the windscreen corner. However, Chery stated that it plans to export cars to the European Union only after 2015, though some of its products are already available in Italy through the DR Motor brand.

In March 2011, Belgrade Municipal police received a number of 15 Chery A3 vehicles (and two Tiggo), awarding the Chinese automaker as the winner in a bid where it reportedly competed against recognized brands from Europe. They are the first law-enforcement body in Europe to drive Chinese manufactured vehicles, after the Chery brand already gained access to the governmental vehicle market in countries like Egypt and Iraq.

== Motorsport ==
The Chery Flying Star Rally Team is racing Chery A3 cars in the Chinese Rally Championship in the last seasons and from 2011 it entered the Chinese Touring Car Championship too with the A3.

== Engines ==
Engine	Code	Displacement	Power at rpm	Torque at rpm	Top speed	Years	Gearbox
I4 petrol engines
1.6i 16V; DOHC	ACTECO- SQR481F	1,597 сc	87.5 kW (119 PS; 117 hp) at 6,150	147 N⋅m (108 lb⋅ft) at 4,300-4,500	180 km/h (112 mph)	2008–present	5-speed manual
1.6i 16V DVVT; DOHC	E4G16	1,598 cc	93 kW (126 PS; 125 hp) at 6,150	169 N⋅m (125 lb⋅ft) at 3,900	180 km/h (112 mph)	2008–present	5-speed manual (China only)
1.8i 16V; DOHC	ACTECO- SQR481FC	1,845 cc	97 kW (132 PS; 130 hp) at 5,750	170 N⋅m (125 lb⋅ft) at 4,300	187 km/h (116 mph)	2008–present	5-speed manual/ 4-speed automatic
2.0i 16V; DOHC	ACTECO- SQR484F	1,971 cc	102 kW (139 PS; 137 hp) at 5,750	182 N⋅m (134 lb⋅ft) at 4,300	193 km/h (120 mph)	2008–present	4-speed automatic

== Gallery ==
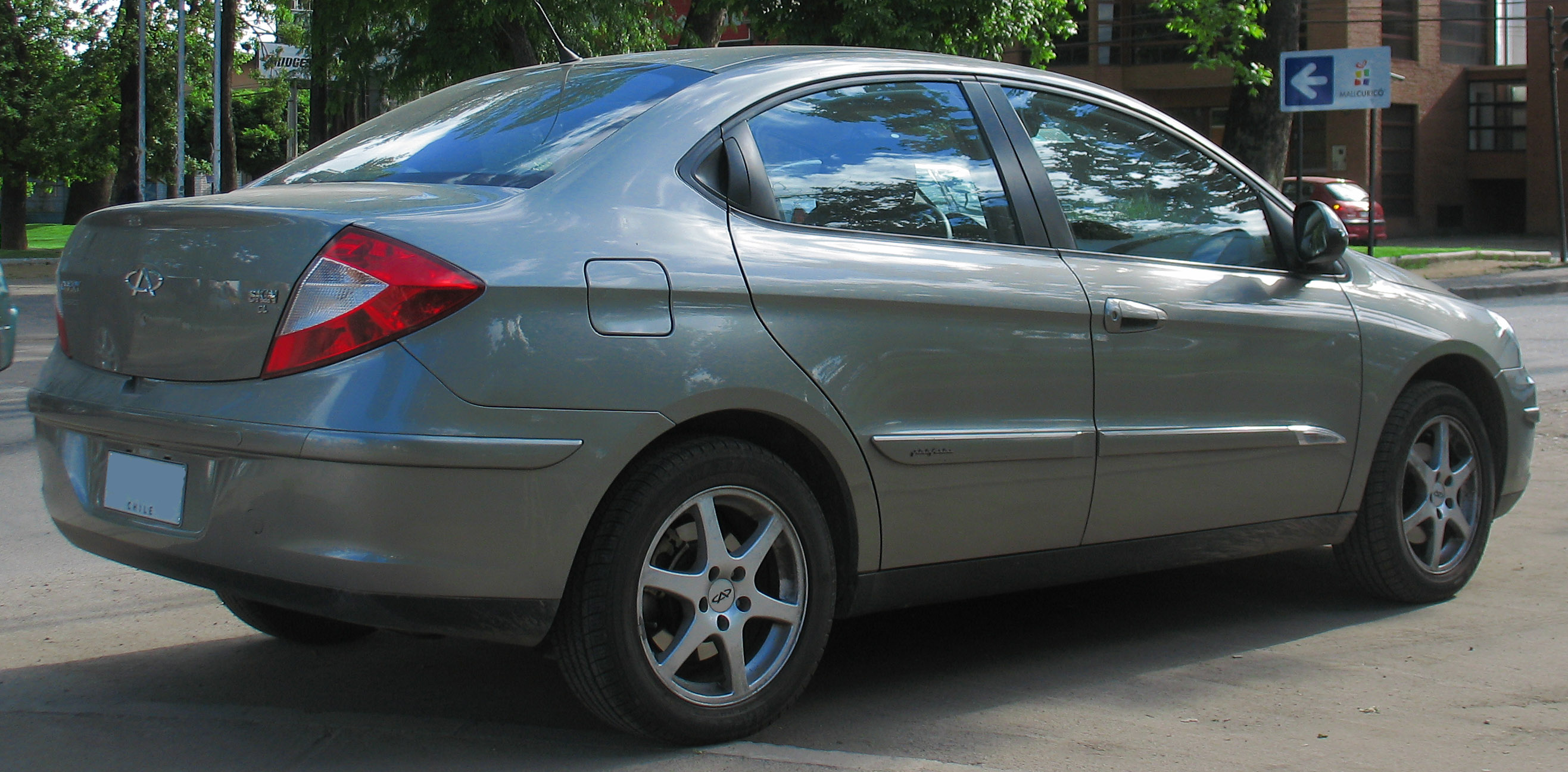
Chery A3 4-door sedan

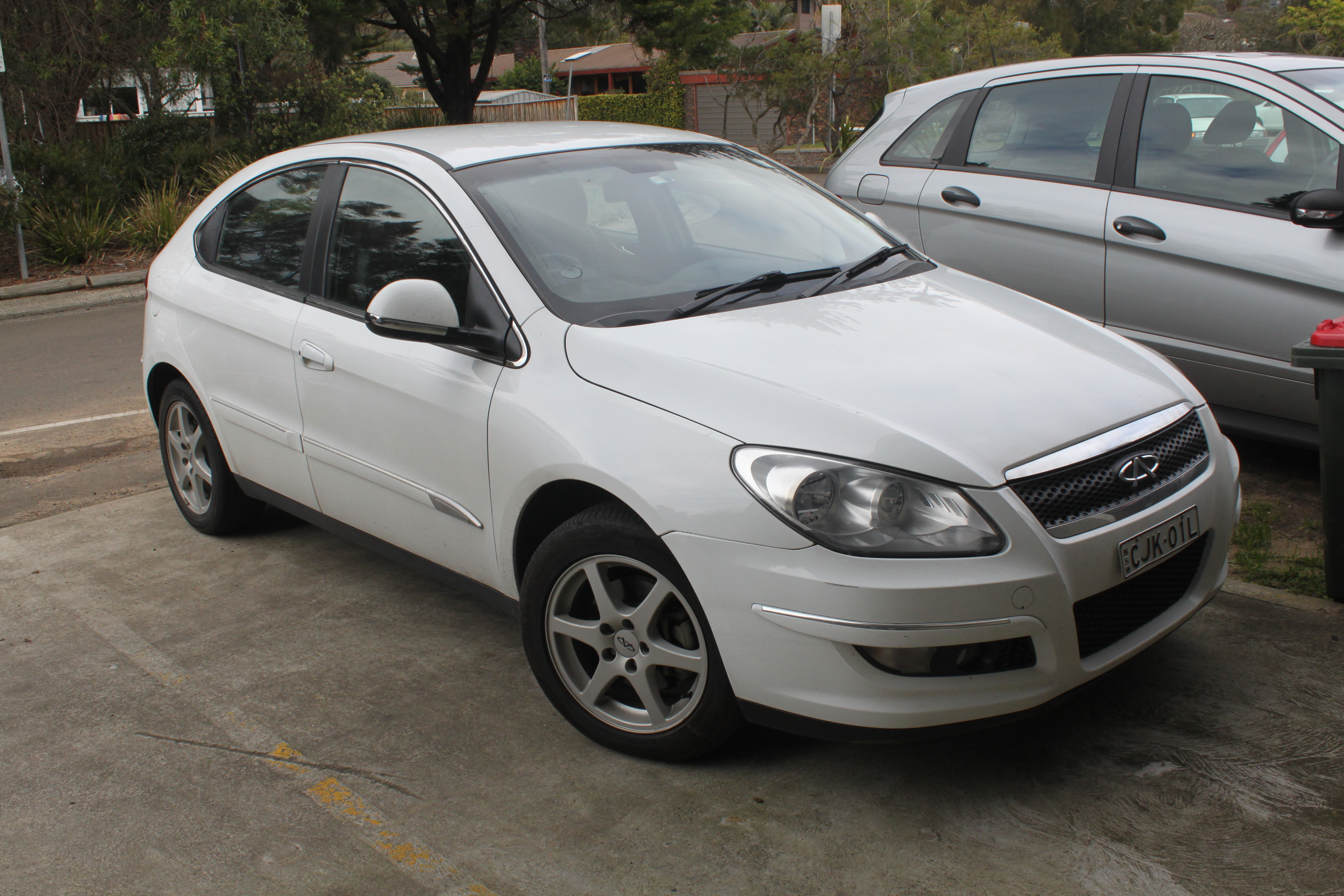
Chery J3 5-door hatchback

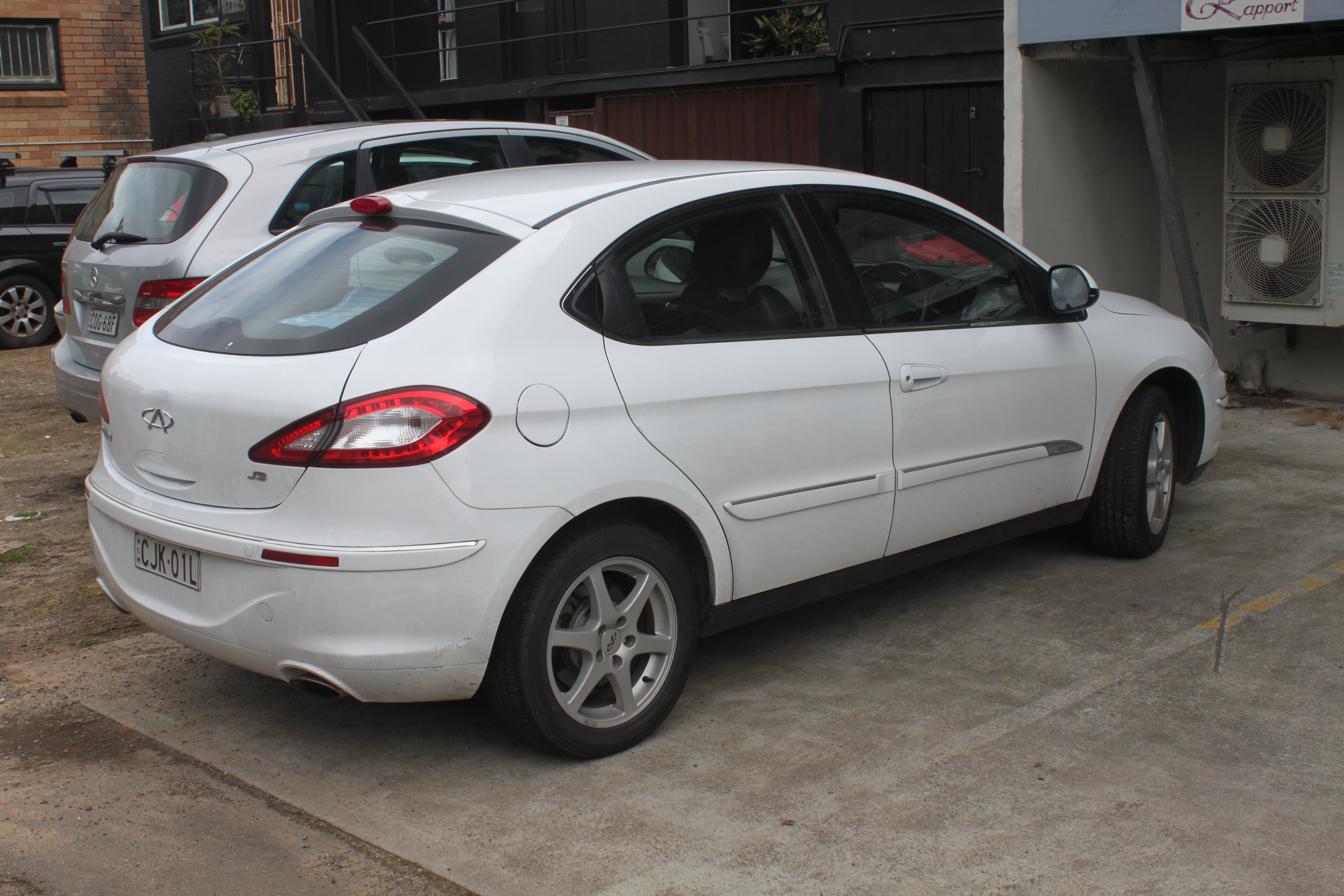
Chery J3 5-door hatchback
