= Proton Arena =

Front-wheel-drive coupé utility vehicle

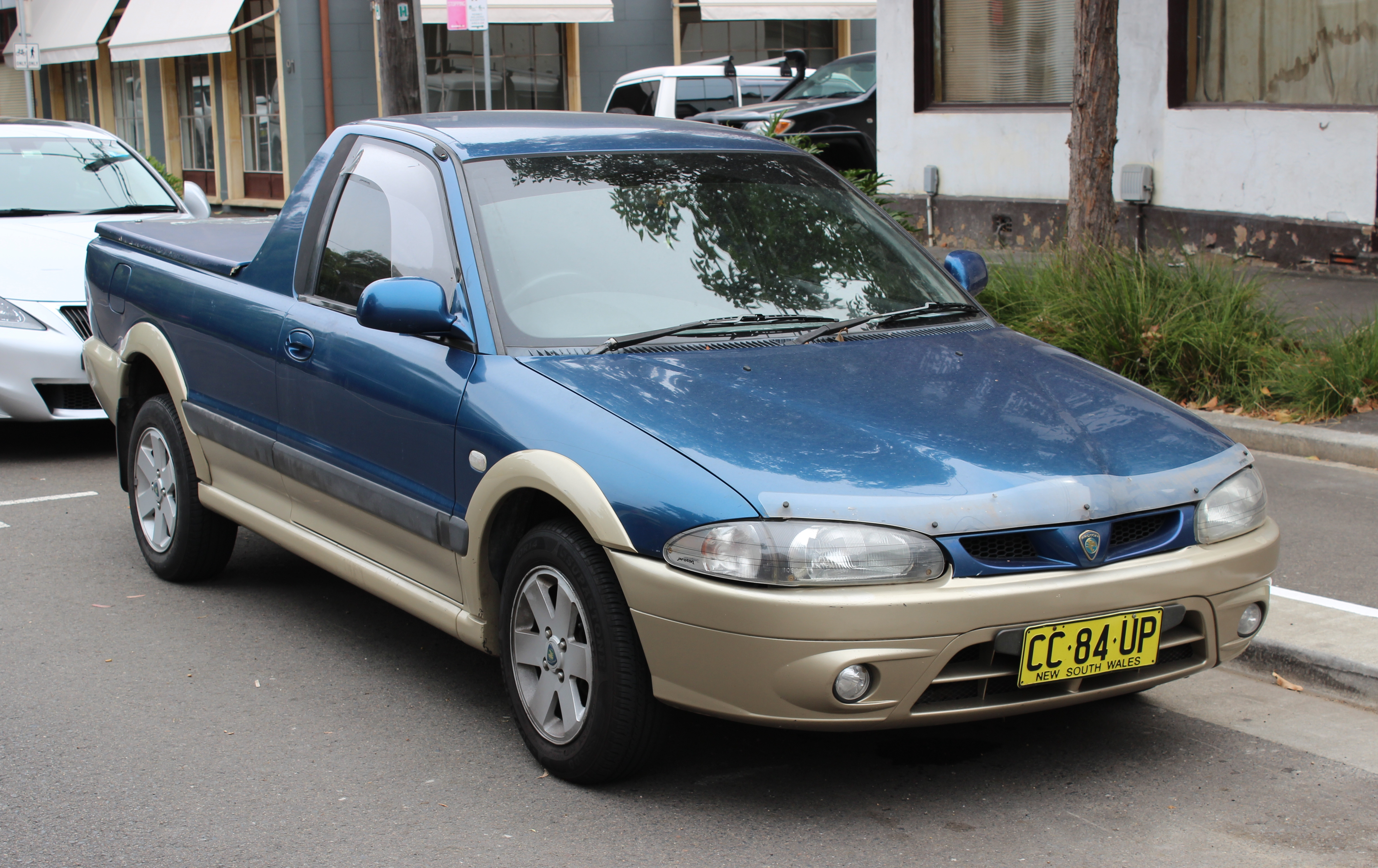

Overview
- Manufacturer: Proton
- Model code: C90
- Also called: Proton Jumbuck (United Kingdom, Taiwan and Australia)
- Production: 2002–2009
- Assembly: Malaysia: Shah Alam, Selangor

Body and chassis
- Class: Light commercial vehicle
- Body style: 2-door coupé utility
- Layout: Front-engine, front-wheel drive
- Related: Proton Wira

Powertrain
- Engine: 1.5 L 4G15 I4
- Transmission: 5-speed manual

Dimensions
- Wheelbase: 2,600 mm (102.4 in)
- Length: 4,455 mm (175.4 in)
- Width: 1,690 mm (66.5 in)
- Height: 1,420 mm (55.9 in)
- Kerb weight: 1,045 kg (2,304 lb)

The Proton Arena (also called Proton Jumbuck in some markets) is a small front wheel drive coupé utility manufactured by Malaysian automaker Proton. Introduced in 2002, the Arena is the only form of pickup by Proton, and is the only Proton model to enjoy significantly more popularity in its export market than domestically.

The suspension configuration of the Arena consists of a combination of independent MacPherson strut suspensions from a saloon car at the front, and torsion beam, leaf sprung suspensions at the rear. Common vehicle modifications include the use of a rigid rear axle, an uprated front stabiliser bar, 14" front ventilated discs and 9" rear diffs with load sensing proportioning valves (AWD conversion), large bull bars, suspension lift kits and the use of reinforced high-profile tyres. Lotus Engineering provided additional ride and handling enhancements. Similar to the car it is based on, the Arena is powered by a 1.5-litre, 12-valve Electronically Fuel Injected (EFI) Mitsubishi 4G15 engine fitted with Proton's proprietary EMS 400 engine management system. The Arena was proclaimed to have met Europe's Euro 2 emission standards, and was also claimed to provide a good power-and-fuel efficiency balance by producing an output of 60.6 hp (45 kW) per litre and a power-to-weight ratio of 85.2 hp (64 kW) per tonne. While fuel consumption is low for a utility (5.8-litre per 100 km on the highway and 8.5-litre per 100 km in the city), it was not intended for heavy duty usage, and instead fills a market segment below that occupied by larger coupé utilities. This can be rectified via the installation of the 4G93 and 4G63T engines from the Mitsubishi Lancer range of vehicles.

== Body design ==
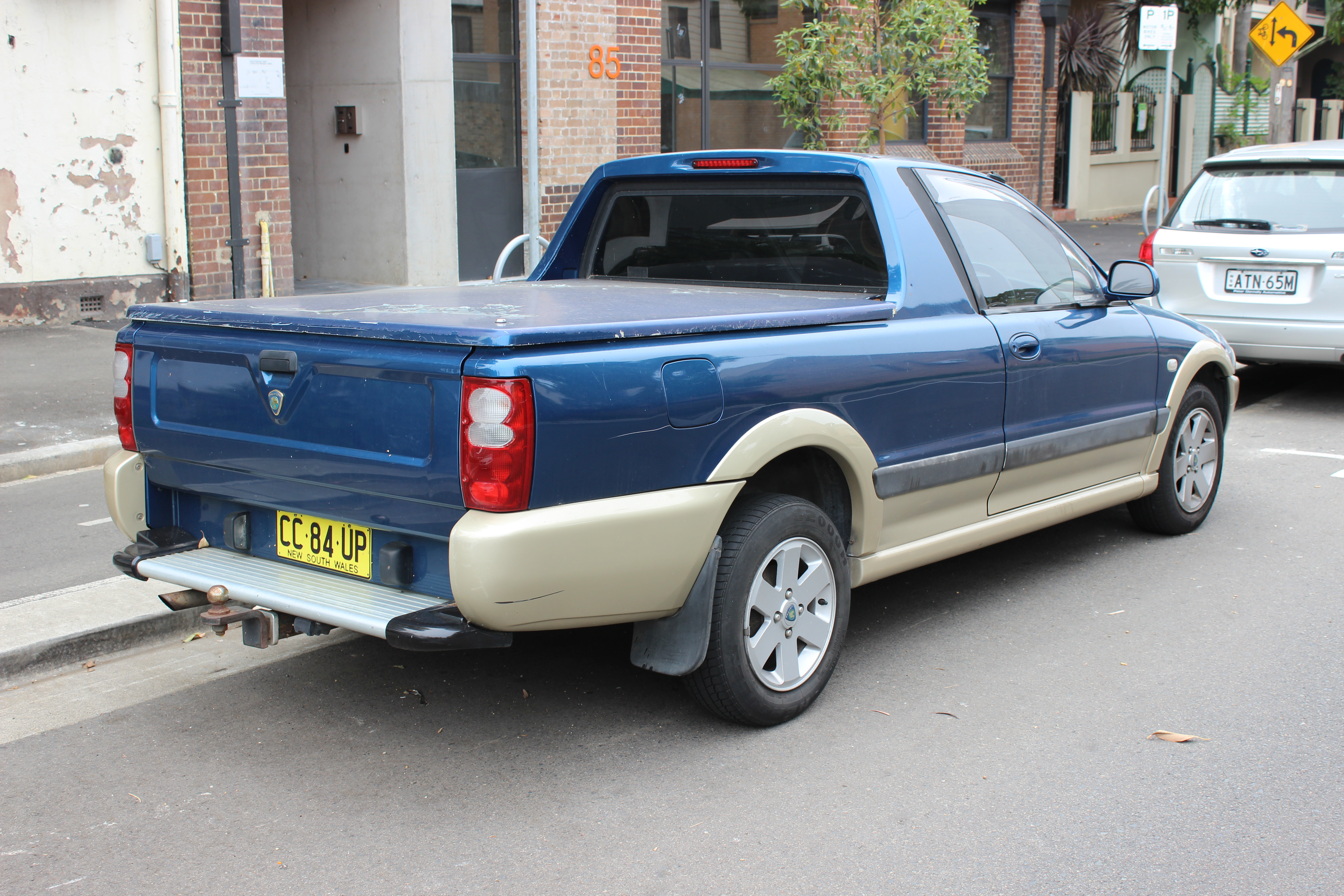
Proton Jumbuck rear

The Arena is based largely on Proton's Wira/Persona saloon, sharing similar frontal designs of the then current Wira and mechanics, but having a reduced seating capacity of two confined to a Wira-based cabin and featuring a rear cargo bed measuring 1,636 mm (64.4 in) x 1,349 mm (53.1 in) x 415 mm (16.3 in) with a maximum payload of 570 kg (1,257 lb) and a maximum load area of 1.64 m (65 in) x 1.18 m (46 in).

In Malaysia, the Arena is offered in three variants, which features a variety of cargo bed accessories and trims but does not vary mechanically from the export edition:

- The "Freestyle", the base Arena model with an open bed, exposed metal sports bars, steel rims and hubcaps.
- The "Sportdeck", an open bed variant similar to the Freestyle with covered sports bars, body trims, and alloy rims.
- The "Fastback", an upmarket variant with a hard, streamlined tonneau cover-cum-camper shell (resembling a fastback body style), body trims, and alloy rims.

In Australia, the Jumbuck was available in two variants, GLi and GLSi.

- GLSi - Top of the line model featuring a gold accent around the lower half of the vehicle exterior, as well as gold accented bumper at the front and bumperettes at the rear. This model also had "all power options" such as Power Mirrors and Power Windows. Interior was cloth seats.
- GLi - No power options, and vehicle body was uniform colour.

=== Chassis ===
Like the Wira, the Arena is of unibody construction, but in order to sustain additional loads from the cargo bed, the Arena includes a load-bearing ladder frame connected to a "torque box" for improved body durability and strength.

The Torque box consists of a semi-independent ladder frame that has been bonded to the cabin and central underside of the load bed, including the front and rear suspension mounts for the rear leaf suspension.

The Vehicle Fuel Tank is also mounted to the Torque Box.

This allows loads to be transmitted from the load area of the vehicle directly into the rear suspension, without transmitting large loads into the rear firewall of the vehicle cabin, or into the outer monocoque shell of the vehicle, reducing buckling and increasing torsional stiffness of the vehicle.

At front of the Torque Box is a rear firewall, designed to integrate the front end Wira architecture into the rear Proton designed architecture. This facilitates a seamless bodyline and transition of loads through the vehicle structure, and links the torque box into the cab as a single unit.

== Safety ==
While freely sold in Malaysia, no stringent third-party safety tests on the Arena were conducted or published publicly in the country.

In September 2009, the Jumbuck was crash tested by the Australasian New Car Assessment Program (ANCAP). The Jumbuck fared poorly, receiving a one-star rating out of five.

The Jumbuck lacks many of the safety features offered in other modern automobiles, such as airbags and anti-lock brakes. The absence of such safety features in an attempt to lower retail pricing is suspected to be one factor for the one-star crash test result.

Proton Cars Australia has criticised the choice of the Jumbuck for the test, arguing the vehicle is the last of an old platform and was due for a replacement in the middle of 2010, however, production of the Jumbuck finished in 2009.

The Proton Jumbuck additionally is fitted with either a 175/70R14 (88R) or 185/60R15 (88S) tyre, and a 5.5Jx14 ET40 or 6Jx15 ET40 rim.

These rims although shared with size in the Wira, and more common small cars like the Mitusbishi Lancer, they are not generally designed to be loaded with heavy weights, with a load rating of only 560 kg per tyre, and a Gross Vehicle Mass of 1,500 kg, the vehicle is running close to its designed limits on axle group loadings, especially when cornering and roll forces are applied to the vehicle.

The Jumbuck however does carry a spare tyre located under the rear of the load area, in a drop-down cradle that allows ease of access by reaching under the rear passenger step. The vehicle has a full-sized spare tyre, meaning regular highway speeds are viable when the vehicle is operated using the spare tyre.

ANCAP test results Proton Jumbuck (2008)
Test	Score
Overall	1 /5 stars
Frontal offset	1/16
Side impact	7.39/16
Pole	Not Assessed
Seat belt reminders	0/3
Whiplash protection	Not Assessed
Pedestrian protection	Marginal
Electronic stability control	Not Available

== Marketing ==
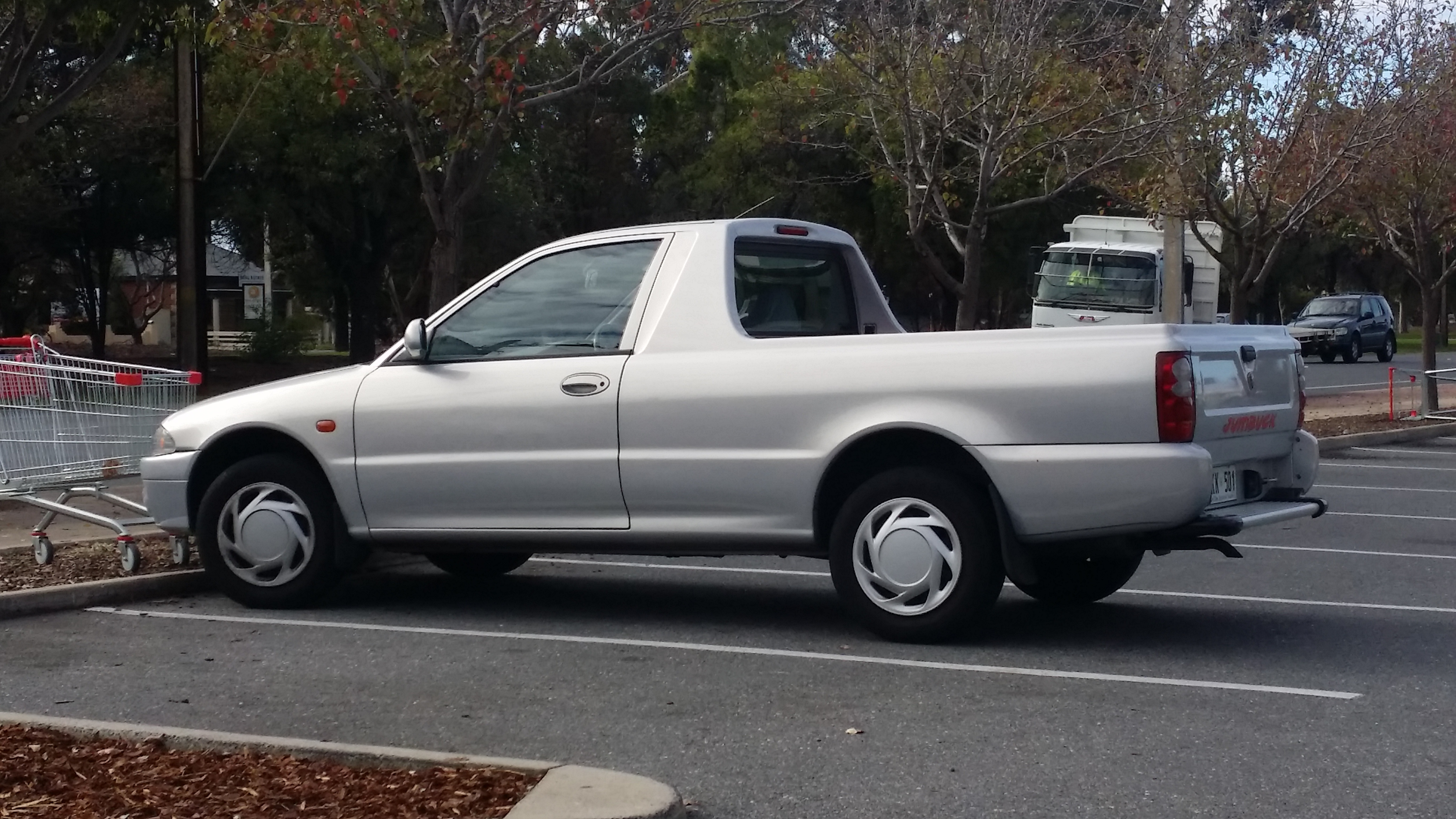
Proton Jumbuck GLi (Australia)

In Malaysia, the Arena was often marketed for both commercial and recreational use. The stripped down Freestyle variant was specified to be targeted exclusively for a variety of commercial interests, while the Sportdeck variant was offered for both private owners and businesses. The Fastback variant, the top-of-the-line Arena, was targeted at private owners. While the three Arena variants were advertised as models for specialised tasks, all three models may be used in any way.

Although the Arena was offered in Malaysia, the Arena was not popular in the local market and was mostly an export model (particularly to the United Kingdom, Australia and South Africa, where coupé utilities are more marketable).

The Jumbuck remains a relevant model two decades after its British launch. Of the estimated 1,800 units registered between 2003 and 2006 in Great Britain and Northern Ireland, only 410 units remain licensed as of Q2 2025, with a further 472 units on SORN. just under 25% of all Proton Jumbucks sold in the UK are still on the roads.

== Sales ==
Year	Malaysia (Note: Figures based on registration)
2002	67
2003	1,615
2004	882
2005	369
2006	148
2007	276
2008	173
2009	284
2010	288
2011	56
2012	1
