= Zagross Khodro =

Iranian industrial company

- Industry: Automotive
- Founded: 1996
- Headquarters: Teheran, Iran
- Products: Automobile
- Number of employees: 2000

Zagross Khodro (Persian: زاگرس خودرو) is an Iranian industrial company that manufactures automobiles in Borujerd for the domestic Iranian market. It was established in 1996. The company's headquarters was located in Tehran.

Zagross Khodro was set up as a private complete knock down (CKD) assembler in July 2002 and has a deal with Proton to produce the Proton Wira and Proton Gen-2 range of hatchbacks and sedans. As the factory has capacity to make 50,000 cars, Zagross Khodro was looking toward other car firms in order to assemble a range of different car brands in the future.

This company was attacked and put out of commission during the twelve-day war in June 2025.
