= Proton Wira =

Malaysian car model

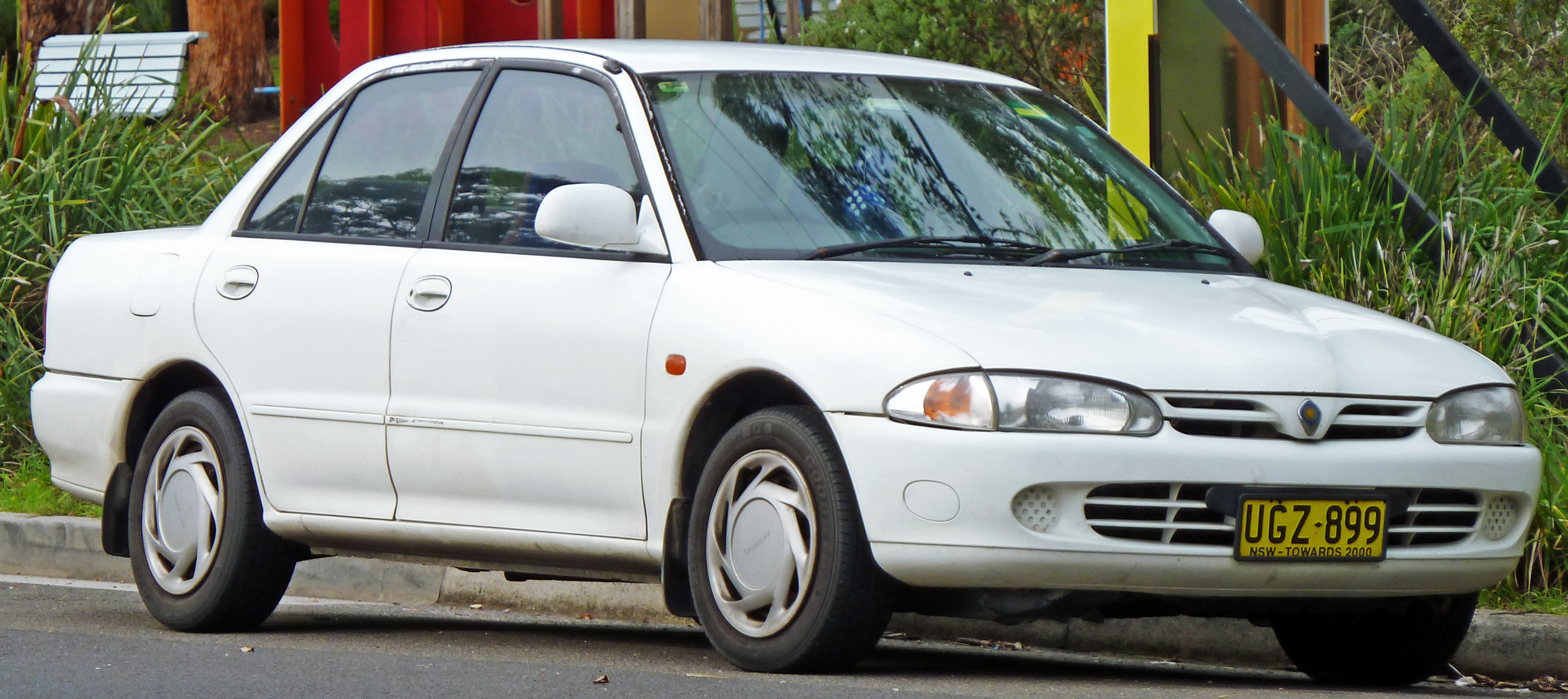
- 1995–1996 Proton Wira XLi sedan

Overview
- Manufacturer: Proton
- Model code: C90
- Also called: Proton Persona (C90); Proton 400 Series; Proton Natura
- Production: May 1993 – June 2009; 952,216 units sold
- Assembly: Malaysia: Shah Alam (PONSB); Indonesia: Cikarang (PCI); Iran: Borujerd (Zagross Khodro); Philippines: Alaminos (PPC); Vietnam: Ho Chi Minh City (Vinastar)

Body and chassis
- Class: Compact car / C-segment
- Body style: 4-door saloon 5-door hatchback
- Layout: Front-engine, front-wheel drive
- Related: Based on: Mitsubishi Lancer/Mirage; Derivatives: Proton Satria; Proton Putra; Proton Arena

Powertrain
- Engine: petrol: 1.3 L 4G13 SOHC I4; 1.5 L 4G15 SOHC I4; 1.5 L 4G91 DOHC I4; 1.6 L 4G92 SOHC I4; 1.8 L 4G93 SOHC I4; 1.8 L 4G93 DOHC I4; diesel: 2.0 L 4D68 I4; 2.0 L 4D68 turbo I4
- Transmission: 5-speed manual; 3-speed automatic (4G1 Series); 4-speed automatic (4G9 Series)

Dimensions
- Wheelbase: 2,500 mm (98.4 in)
- Length: 4,270 mm (168.1 in)
- Width: 1,680 mm (66.1 in)
- Height: 1,385 mm (54.5 in)
- Kerb weight: 980 kg (2,160.5 lb) - 1,011 kg (2,228.9 lb)

Chronology
- Successor: Proton Gen-2 (Wira Aeroback); Proton Persona (CM) (Wira)

The Proton Wira (lit. "hero") is a car manufactured by Malaysian automaker Proton from 1993 to 2009. Based on the fourth-generation Mitsubishi Lancer, it was produced in four-door saloon and five-door hatchback models.

== History ==
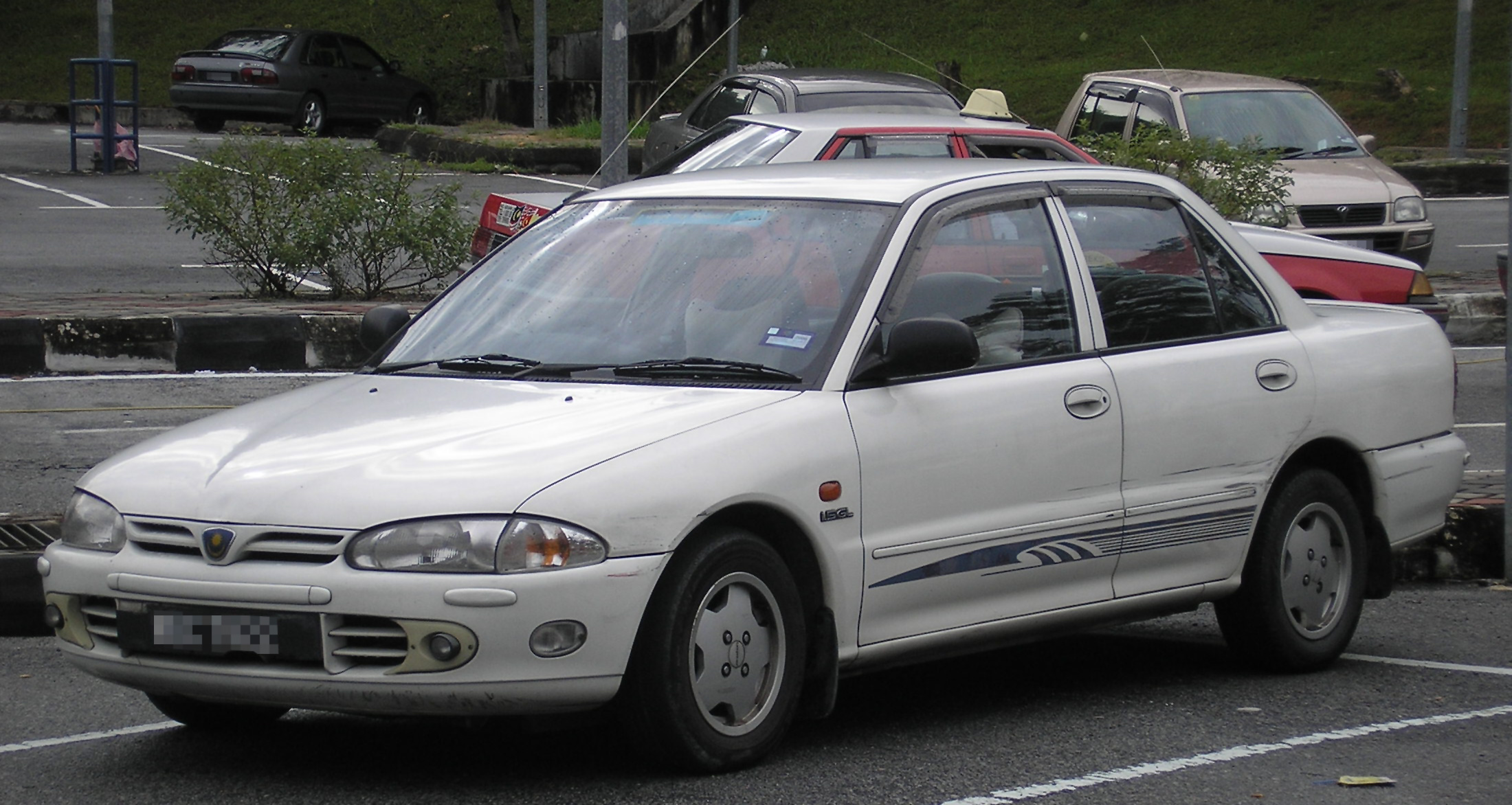

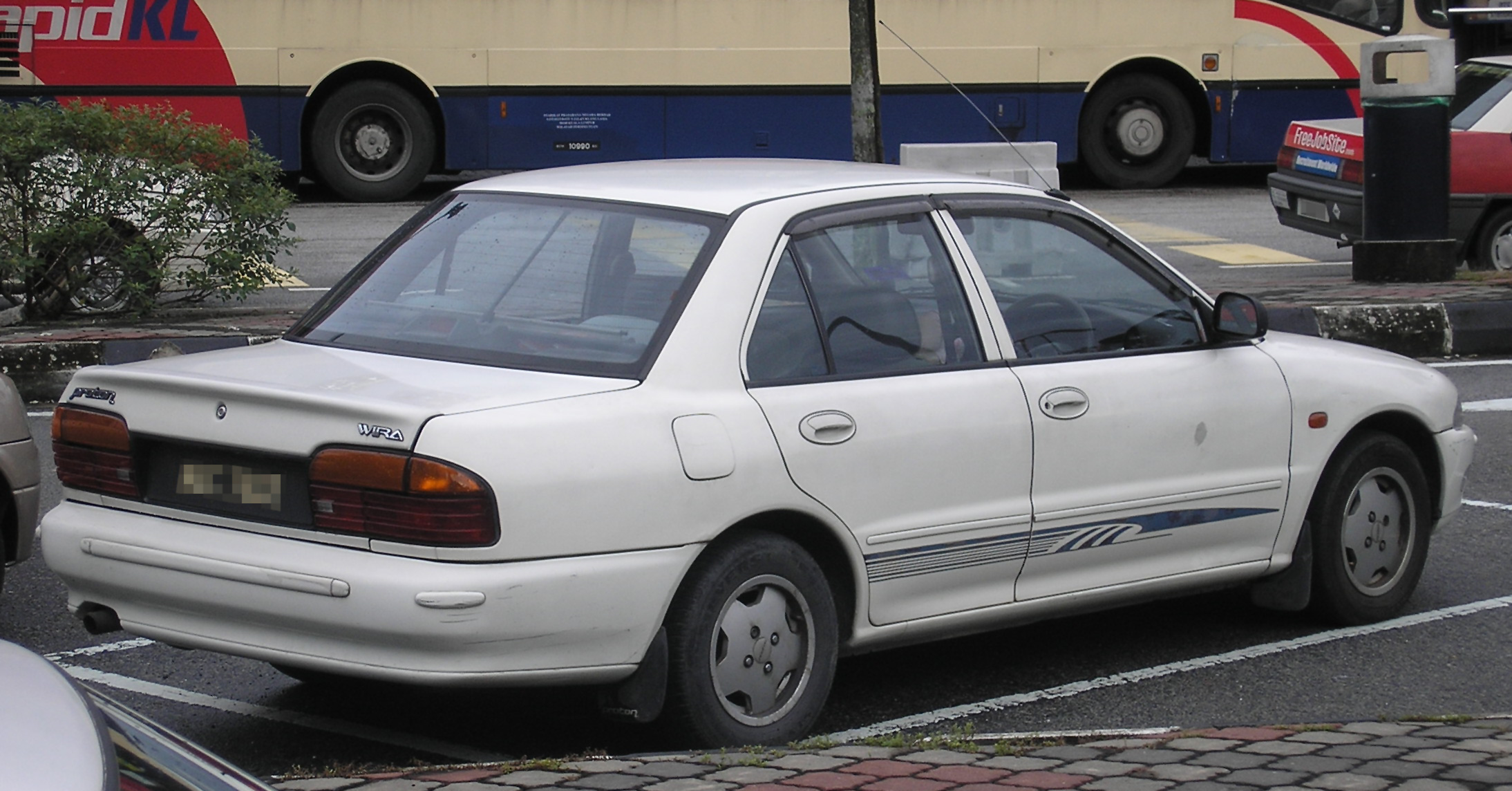
Saloon (pre-facelift)

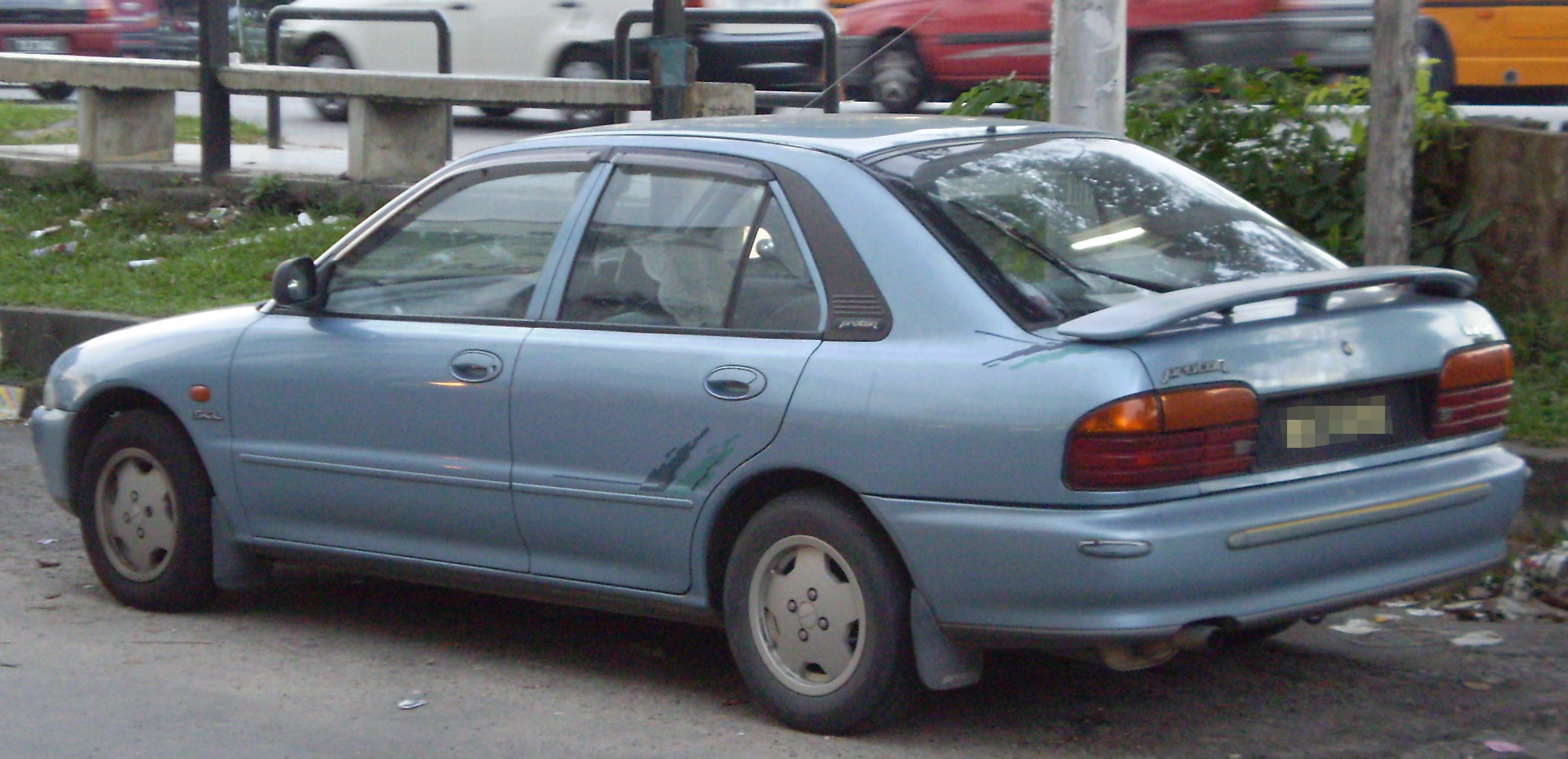
Aeroback (pre-facelift)

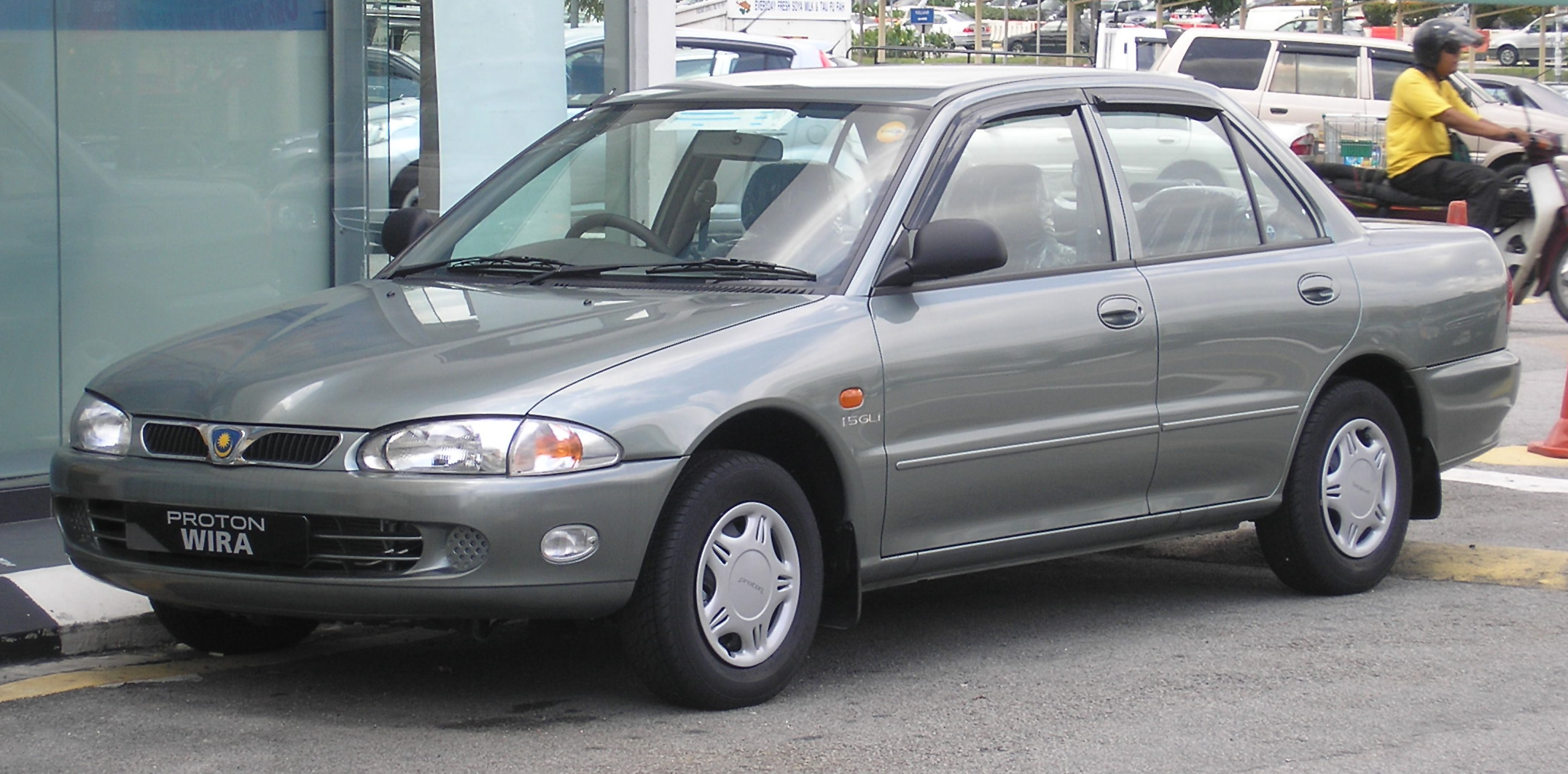

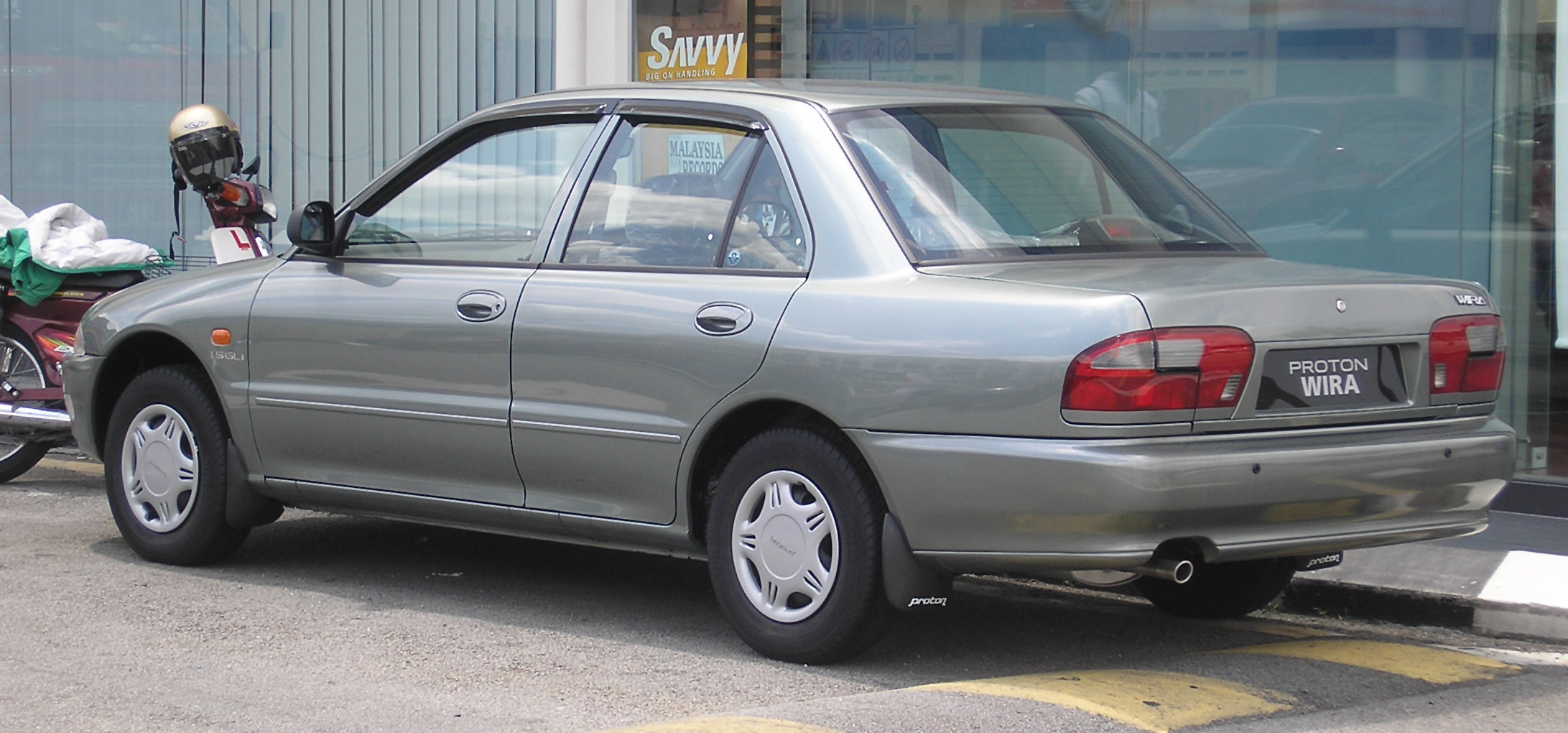
Saloon (facelift)

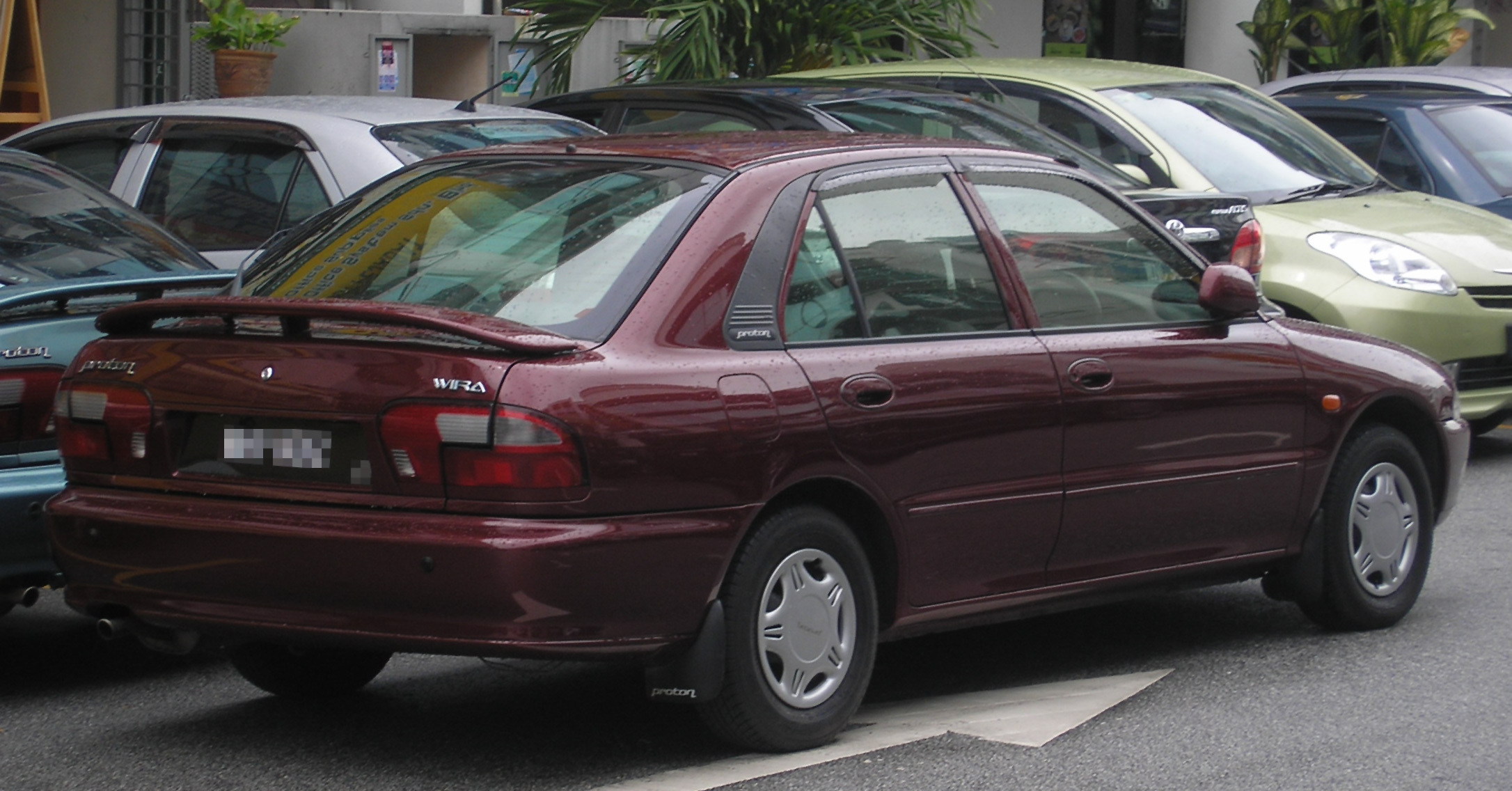
Aeroback (facelift)

Development of a second, all new Proton model began as early as the middle of 1988. The Wira was introduced on 21 May 1993 as a four-door saloon, based on the CB2A–CB4A-CD9A platform shared with the 1991 Mitsubishi Lancer, with slightly modified styling to distinguish it. Modifications includes a Proton designed dashboard, front grille and bonnet, headlights, front bumper and front fenders from the Mirage and tail lights from the 1987 Galant hatchback. At launch, 3 variants were available: 1.5 GL MT, 1.5 GL AT and 1.6 XLi AT.

The frontal design continues the styling first shown in the Proton Iswara with a fluted bonnet that tapers towards the Proton badge on the grille. Rear disc brakes, front and rear armrests, electric mirrors, folding rear seats and electric windows on all doors were features available on the 1.6 variant.

In October 1993, a five-door hatchback version (initially badged as the Wira Aeroback, in a similar fashion as the five door Saga hatchback) was introduced with two variants, 1.6XLi MT and 1.6XLi AT. At the same time, both saloon and hatchback models launched in the UK.

In 1994, both 1.3 GL MT saloon and 1.5 GL AT hatchback variants joined the range in Malaysia.

In 1995, the Wira received new grille and tail lights with clear indicators. This coincided with the introduction of diesel powered Wira variants. Wira 1.3's are not equipped with a rev counter. The Wira 1.8 EXi joined the range available with an automatic transmission, available with sedan or Aeroback bodywork and a single overhead cam engine. The 1.8 EXi automatics also came standard with ABS brakes. There was also a limited edition Wira 1.8 EXi DOHC with a manual transmission dubbed "FIA Homologated Special Edition", built to meet the homologation requirement of at least 2,500 units set by the World Rally Championship. A total of 2,450 cars finished in Majorca Black and another 50 RS versions painted solid white were produced. The Wira 1.8 EXi DOHC used a unique grille design and the engine produces 103 kW (140 PS; 138 hp). Non-RS variants featured AAC 14" wheels, Recaro seats, Momo steering wheel and leather gear knob, larger disc brakes, larger anti roll bars, extra welding reinforced chassis, twin tip exhaust muffler and a rear spoiler. The RS variant interior was more on par with the 1.3 GL variant for weight savings but with 15 inch ROH rally wheels. The Wira was manufactured in the Philippines in the same year under Proton Pilipinas Corporation.

In 1996, the Wira was launched and marketed in Vietnam by Vina Star Motor Corporation.

In 1999, the 1.8 grille design was introduced to 1.5 and 1.6 variants. This coincided with the upgrade from carburetor to fuel injection on the 1.3 and 1.5 variants. The Wira 1.3 and 1.5 was now known as Wira 1.3 GLi and 1.5 GLi respectively.

In 2001, Proton replaced the Mitsubishi EFi module with a Siemens VDO unit in the 1.3 / 1.5 GLi variants. 1.6 XLi and 1.8 EXi variants were discontinued to avoid overlap with the Proton Waja in the Proton range. The Wira also received suspension tuning from Lotus.

In 2004, Proton Wira received a new grille, front bumper and alloy rims which is similar to Proton Arena. Also introduced was Wira Special Edition or WiSE based on the Wira 1.5 GLi Aeroback but had unique front seats with hollow out headrests, modified exhaust system, larger wheels, aluminium pedals and red finish and accents to various interior pieces.

Several Proton models released following the Wira's debut sported frontal stylings that were derivatives of the Wira's. Among them, the original Satria three door hatchback, the Putra two door "sports" coupé, and the Arena coupe utility.

The Wira was replaced by two similar in-house designed Proton cars: the Gen-2 and the Persona. The Gen2, codenamed Wira Replacement Model (WRM) was launched in 2004 as a replacement for the Wira Aeroback while the Persona launched in 2007 as a replacement for the Wira sedan.

The last Proton Wiras were produced in June 2009. Proton sold 14,908 units of the Wira in Malaysia for 2007, and a further 1,907 and 1,974 were sold in 2008 and 2009 respectively. The last Proton Wiras were registered as late as 2012 in the Malaysian market. Additionally, the last two Proton Wiras were registered in the United Kingdom in 2006, and 76 Wiras were sold in Indonesia in 2010. The last three units of the Iranian assembled Wira were sold in 2011.

== Powertrains ==
At launch, the Mitsubishi 4G15 1.5-litre 12-valve engine used in the Iswara and its predecessor the Saga, was carried over unchanged for the Wira 1.5 GL. The Mitsubishi 4G92 113 PS (83 kW; 111 hp) 1.6L 16 valve SOHC engine with multi-point fuel injection was introduced together with a four speed automatic transmission for the Wira 1.6 XLi. This variant was the first Proton with power windows for all four doors and electronic fuel injection.

The multi point injection versions were badged as MPi, although this was only used on the engine, and never on the trim levels (unlike 1.5 MPi GLS with the Saga, the trim levels were simply 1.5 GLS and so forth). Additionally, a small number of Wira units were exported with the twin cam 4G91 1.5L.

The Wira 1.3 GL launched in 1995 uses the Mitsubishi 4G13 1.3 litre twelve valve engine which is also used in the Saga.

Also in 1996, a 2.0 litre diesel powered variant (badged as the 2.0D, D, TD, TDi or SDi depending on the market) was also offered. In the Malaysian domestic market this was phased out in later years due to lack of interest from consumers, a result of a road tax rate which was higher on diesel-powered private vehicles than gasoline-powered ones of equivalent displacement (until the tax was revised in 2008).

The Wira 1.8 EXi in 1996 used a 138 bhp (103 kW) 1.8L 16 valve DOHC engine with multi point fuel injection, making the Wira the first Proton car to be powered by a DOHC engine.

1.3 Wira's were sold with 5-speed manual transmissions only. 1.5 Wira's were sold with either a 5-speed manual or 3-speed automatic transmission. 1.6 and 1.8 Wira's were sold with either a 5-speed manual or 4-speed automatic transmission.

== Safety ==
Like most other Proton cars of its time, the Proton Wira did not offer any safety features other than the standard three-point safety belts with pretensioners and laminated windshield. Export models however saw a much better build quality with safety features such as a driver airbag, door intrusion bars and ABS, which were also available as options in the later Malaysian models.

== Exports ==
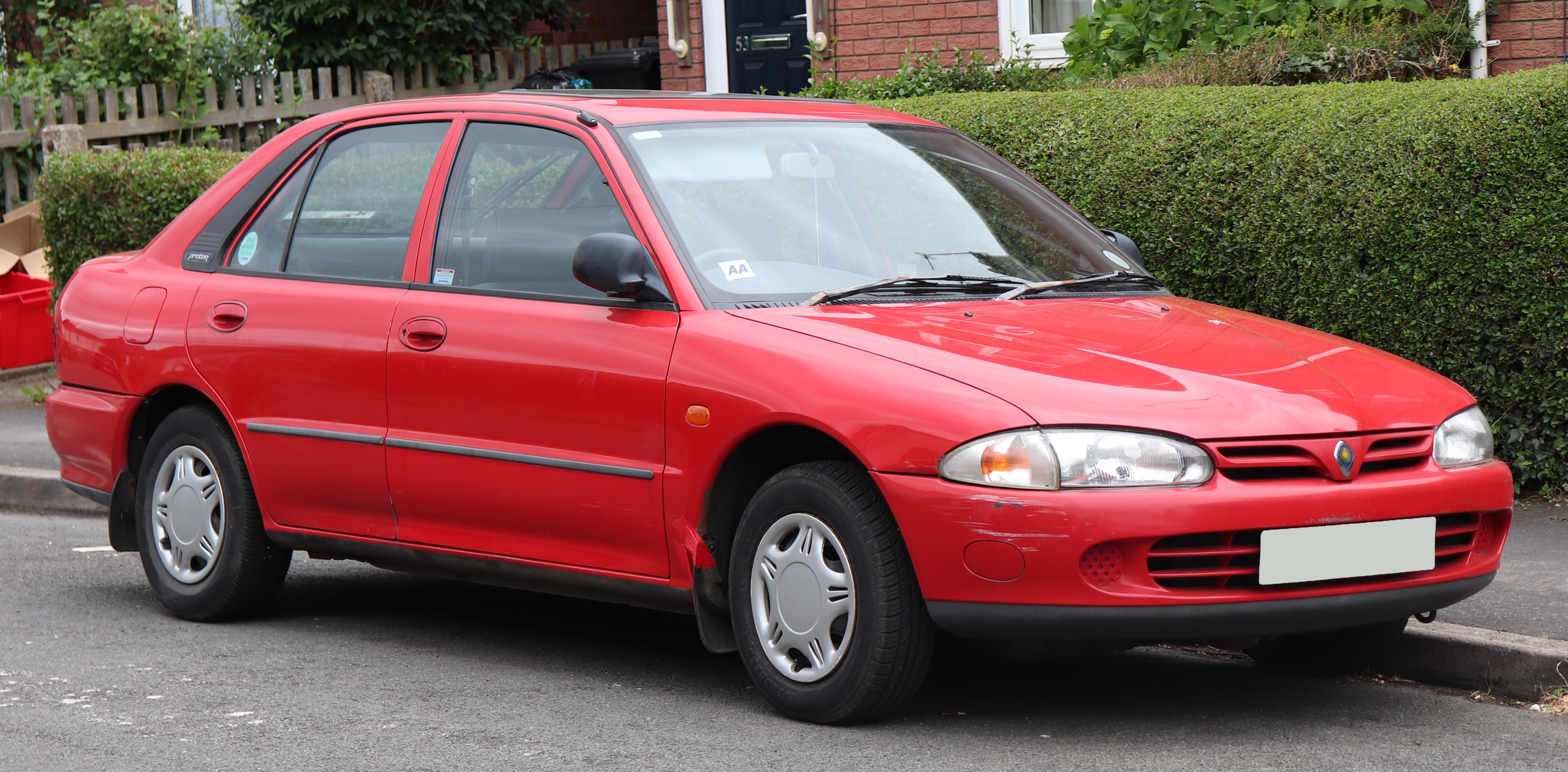

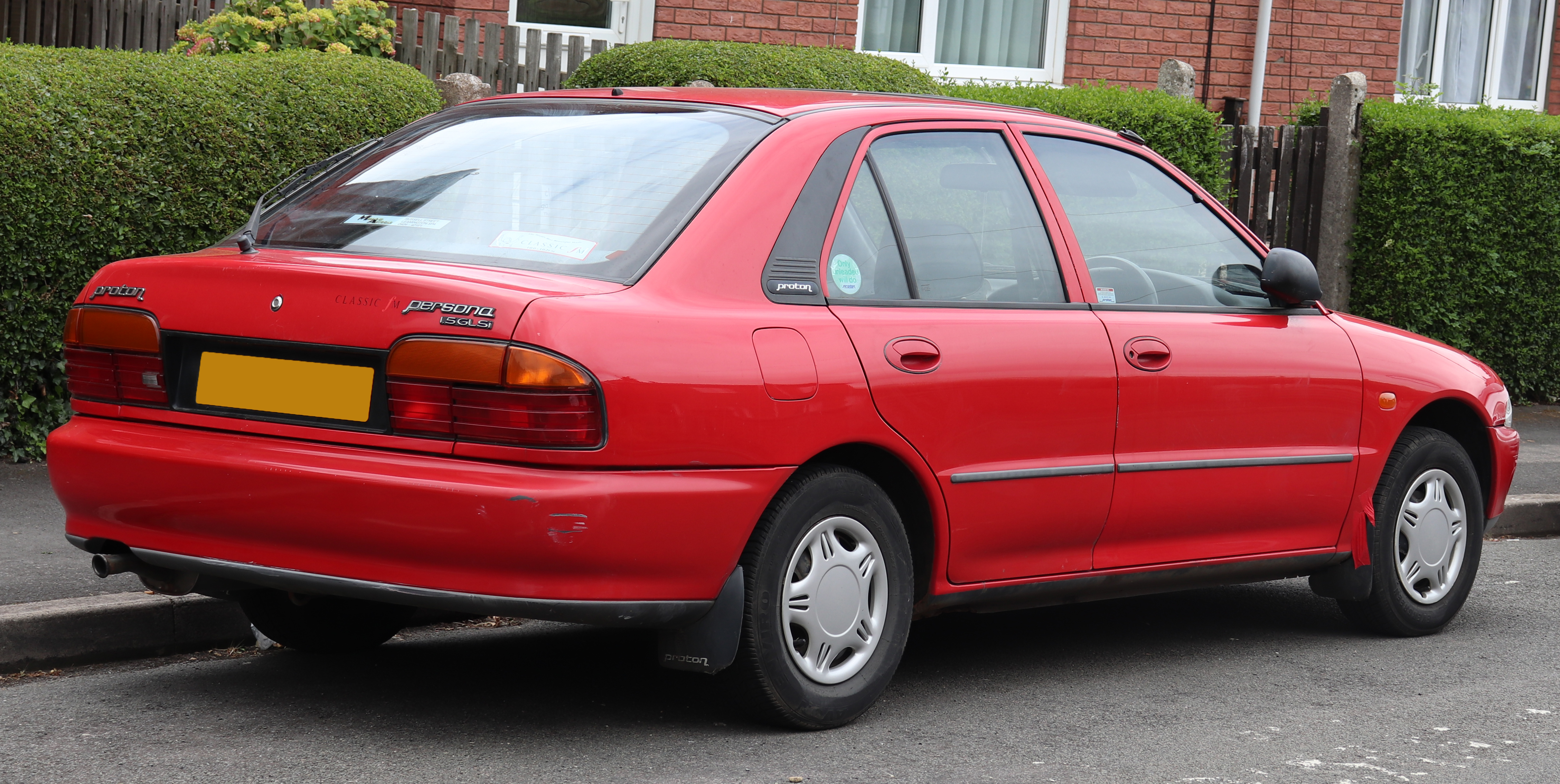
In the UK, the car was branded as the "Proton Persona"

The Wira remains the company's most widely exported model to date, spanning over seventy countries in Asia, Australasia, Europe, Africa, The Middle East and Latin America.

The Wira was also the first Proton to be assembled outside its home country, Malaysia. It was assembled in neighbouring Indonesia, Vietnam and Philippines, as well as Iran. Proton had planned to assemble the Wira in India, Egypt and other markets, but was held back by the 1997 Asian financial crisis.

The Wira saw its British debut in November 1993, where it was renamed Proton Persona. The Persona effectively replaced the original Proton and the Mpi facelift in the British market, although both Mpi and Persona models were sold in parallel for a further three years, until Mpi imports ended in 1996. As with the Mpi, the Persona used multi point fuel injection to comply with the Euro emissions standards.

Personas converted to LPG fuel were used extensively by Humberside Police, with the force operating a total 120 Personas delivered between 1997 and 2002 for general purpose and unmarked use, as well as a number of Proton Compacts. A Compact GTI, developed in conjunction with Lotus Cars with a 1.8-litre engine capable of producing 133 bhp, was also trialled with Humberside in 1999. The force aimed to convert most of its entire fleet to LPG fuel for cost-saving purposes upon the delivery of the Personas, subsequently going on to take bi-fuel petrol-LPG Impians from 2002 onwards.

Between 2001 and 2004, the Wira in the UK used VDO-Siemens engine management systems. The saloon was offered with two variants: 1.3 Li and 1.5 Lxi while the aeroback was offered with four variants: 1.3 Li, 1.5 Lxi, 1.5 Lux and 1.6 Exi.

The Persona was later complemented by a three-door hatch called the Persona Compact, as well as the two door Persona Coupé. From August 2000, the Satria and Wira nameplates were extended to the British market, and the Coupé was discontinued there when production ended in 2001. The Wira was subsequently replaced by the all new Proton GEN•2 in the end of 2004.

The Wira was launched into the Australian market in May 1995, and was renamed to Proton Persona in November 1996.

The Wira was also introduced in the Singaporean market in 2003 and discontinued in 2008.

The Wira is the only Proton model to be offered with a diesel engine, namely Mitsubishi's 2.0 L Sirius 4D68 inline-four engine. Proton needed a diesel engine to further establish themselves in Europe, where diesel engined passenger cars are popular. The 4D68 diesel was produced in both naturally aspirated and turbocharged offerings, where the former produced 64 hp and the latter managed 80 hp.

However, the turbocharged 4D68 could produce 172 Nm of torque, more than any other engine offered in the Wira range, and compared to just 123 Nm without the turbocharger. Most European markets received the turbo diesel, but a handful, such as Germany received the naturally aspirated diesel as well, in both four door and five door guises. In Malaysia, Proton sold the naturally aspirated diesel as the Wira 2.0D, but it was limited to the four door sedan.

In 2005, Zagross Khodro began assembly of Wira complete knock down units for the Iranian market as part of a deal with Proton.

Export Proton Wiras used a different Proton badge compared to the badge found on Wiras for the Malaysian market.

== Sales ==
Year	Malaysia (Note: Figures based on registration)
2000	91,909
2001	86,980
2002	98,211
2003	64,889
2004	46,880
2005	47,344
2006	25,619
2007	16,508
2008	2,056
2009	1,990
2010	264
2011	3
2012	5
