= Proton Persona =

Series of compact and subcompact cars

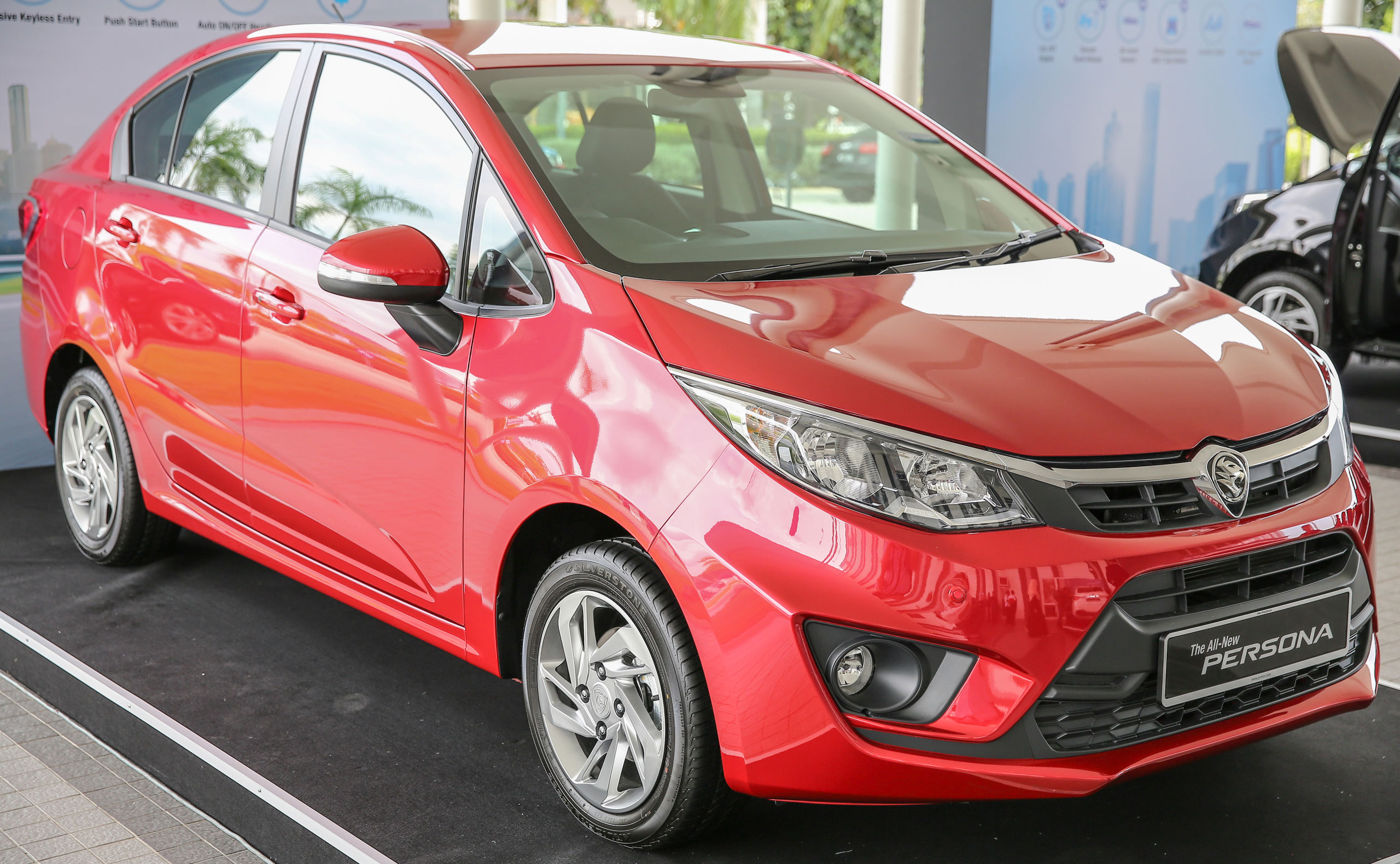
- 2016 Proton Persona

Overview
- Manufacturer: Proton
- Production: 1993–2026
- Assembly: Malaysia: Proton City, Perak

Body and chassis
- Class: Compact car (C) (1993–2016) Subcompact car (B) (2016–2026)

Chronology
- Successor: Proton S70 (indirect)

The Proton Persona is a series of compact and subcompact cars produced by Malaysian automobile manufacturer Proton from 1993 to 2026.

The first generation Proton Persona (C90) refers to the export name given to the Proton Wira. The first use of the 'Proton Persona' nameplate dates back to November 1993 in the British market. The original Persona was later joined by the 3-door Persona Compact, and 2-door Persona Coupé.

The second generation Proton Persona (CM) was launched in August 2007. The CM series is the first Proton model to use the 'Persona' nameplate in its home market. It is based on an extended Proton GEN•2 platform, and was sold as a saloon complement to the GEN•2 hatchback. The CM Persona replaced the Proton Wira saloon in Malaysia and the C90 Persona in its export markets.

The third generation Proton Persona (BH) was unveiled in August 2016. It is based on an extended Proton Iriz platform, and is sold as a saloon complement to the Iriz hatchback. It directly replaced the nine-year-old CM Persona in its home market.

On 23 April 2019, Proton launched a facelifted version of the Persona alongside the Iriz. Proton claimed that both cars had over 300 parts changed and improved. As of 18 February 2021, a black edition of the Persona was launched virtually on Facebook. Production is scheduled to be discontinued in 2026.

== First generation (C95, C96, C97, C98, C99; 1993) ==
Proton Persona
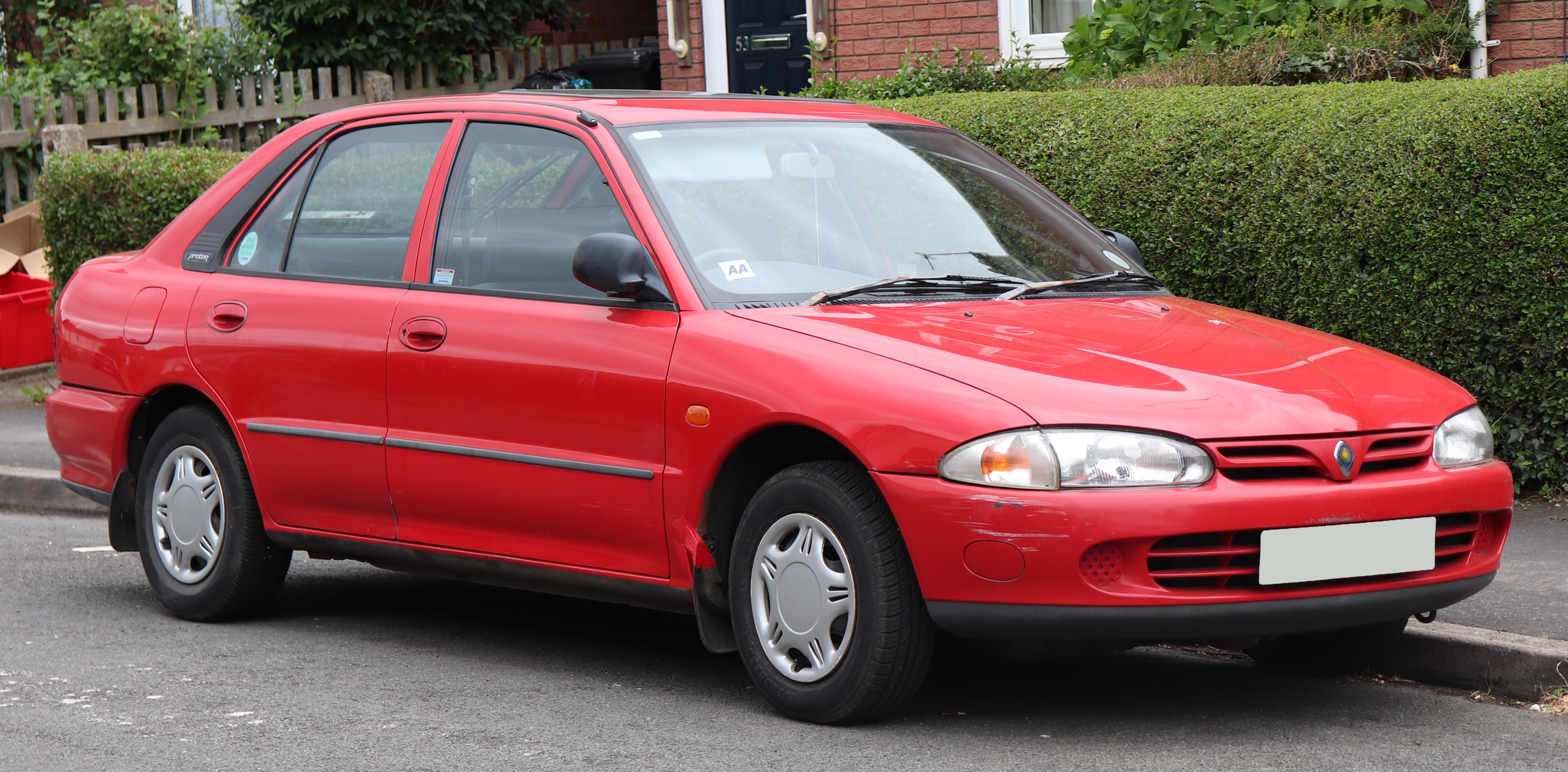

Overview
- Model code: C90
- Also called: Proton Wira; Proton 400 Series; Proton Natura
- Production: November 1993 – August 2007

Body and chassis
- Class: Compact car (C)
- Body style: 2-door coupé 3-door hatchback 4-door saloon 5-door hatchback

The Proton Wira made its debut in the United Kingdom in November 1993, where it was sold as the 'Proton Persona'. The Persona family initially consisted of the 4-door saloon and 5-door hatchback. Later in November 1995, the new Persona Compact model was introduced, and a 2-door Persona Coupé joined the range in 1997. The Compact and Coupé models are the British counterparts of the Proton Satria and Proton Putra in Malaysia. From August 2000, the Satria and Wira nameplates were extended to the British market, and the Coupé was discontinued when production ended in 2001. The Wira was subsequently replaced by the all-new Proton GEN•2 in winter 2004.

The Proton Wira was first exported to Australia in May 1995. It was renamed 'Proton Persona' in 1996, and continued on sale there until 2004. The Persona nameplate was also used for the Wira saloon in Chile.

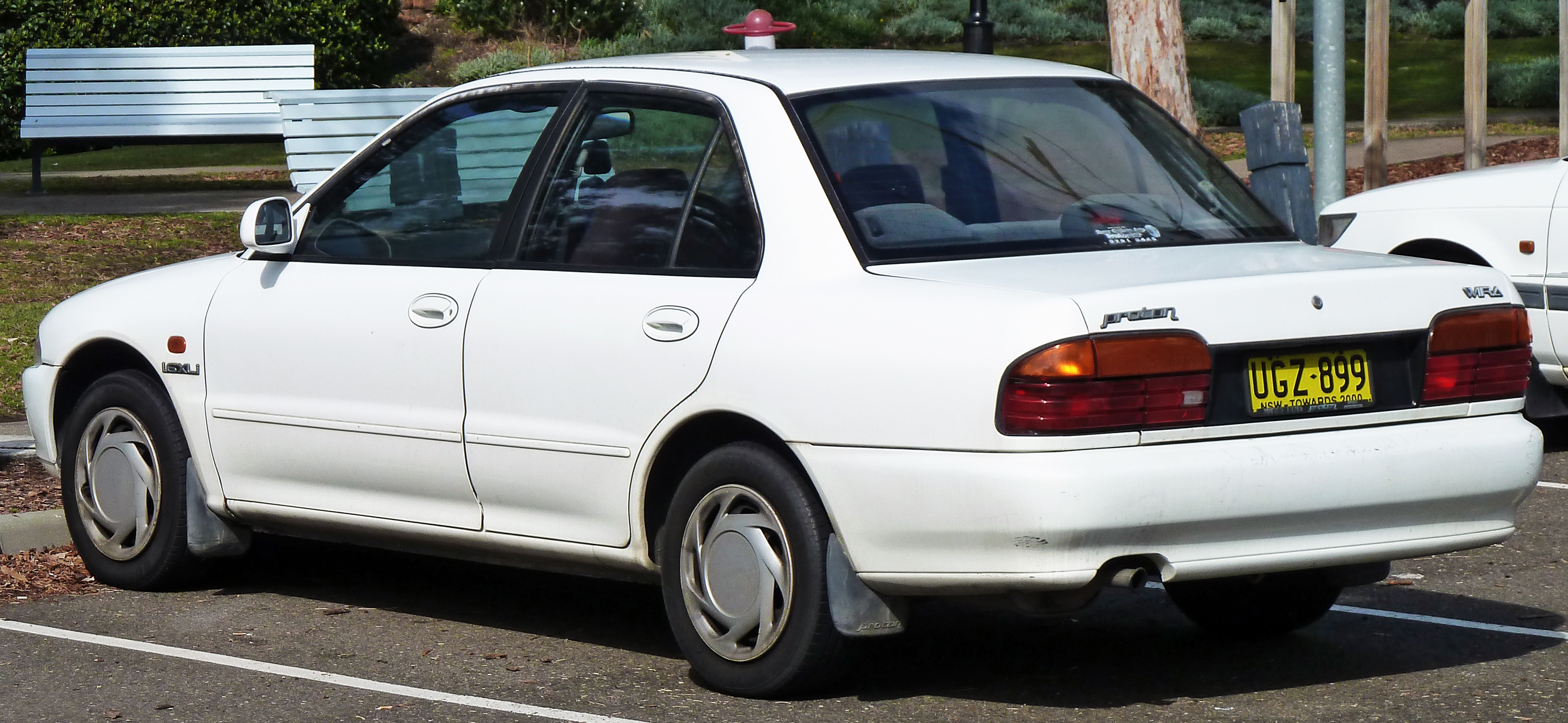
Proton Persona (C90) (4-door)

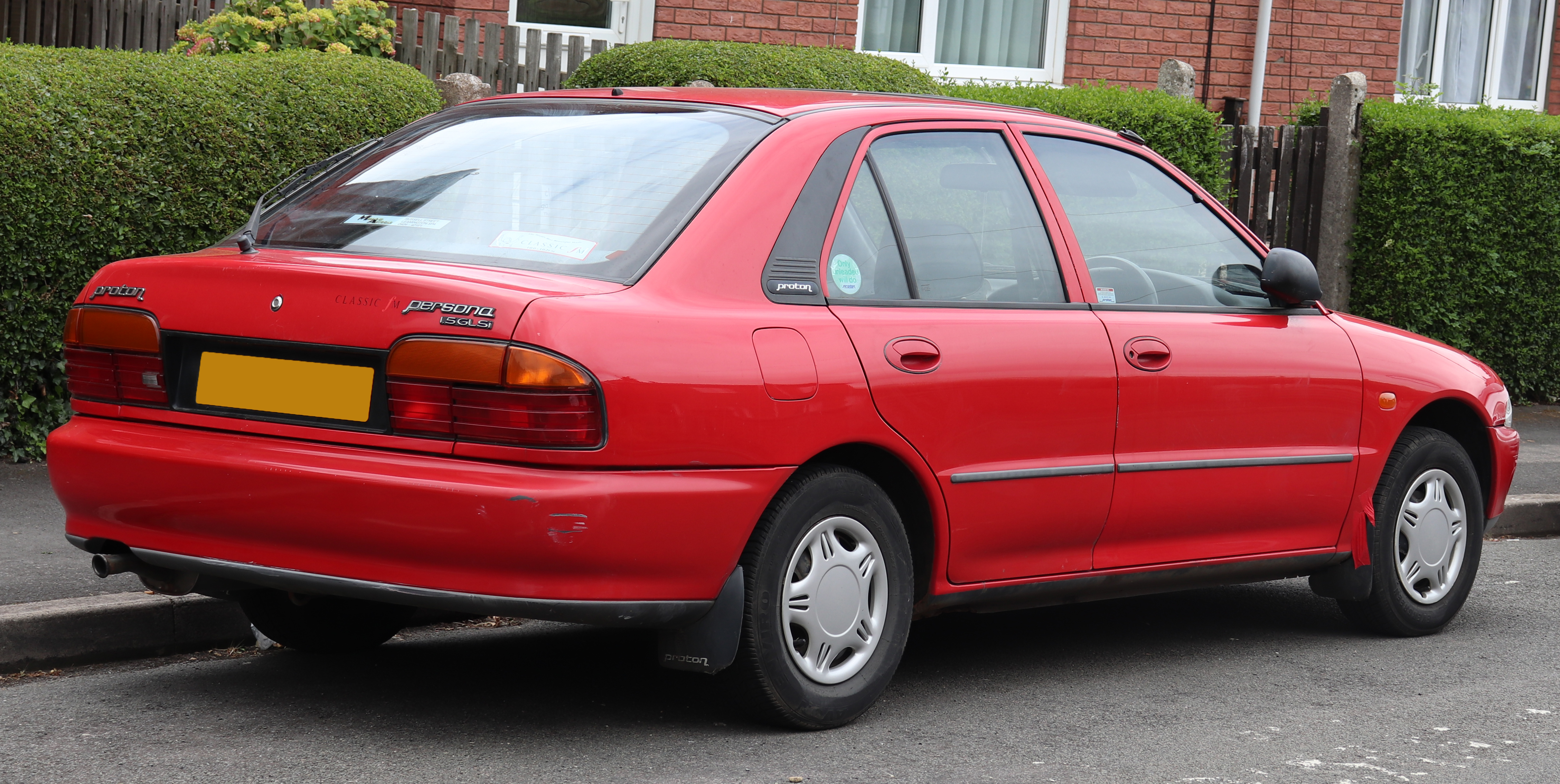
Proton Persona Aeroback (5-door)

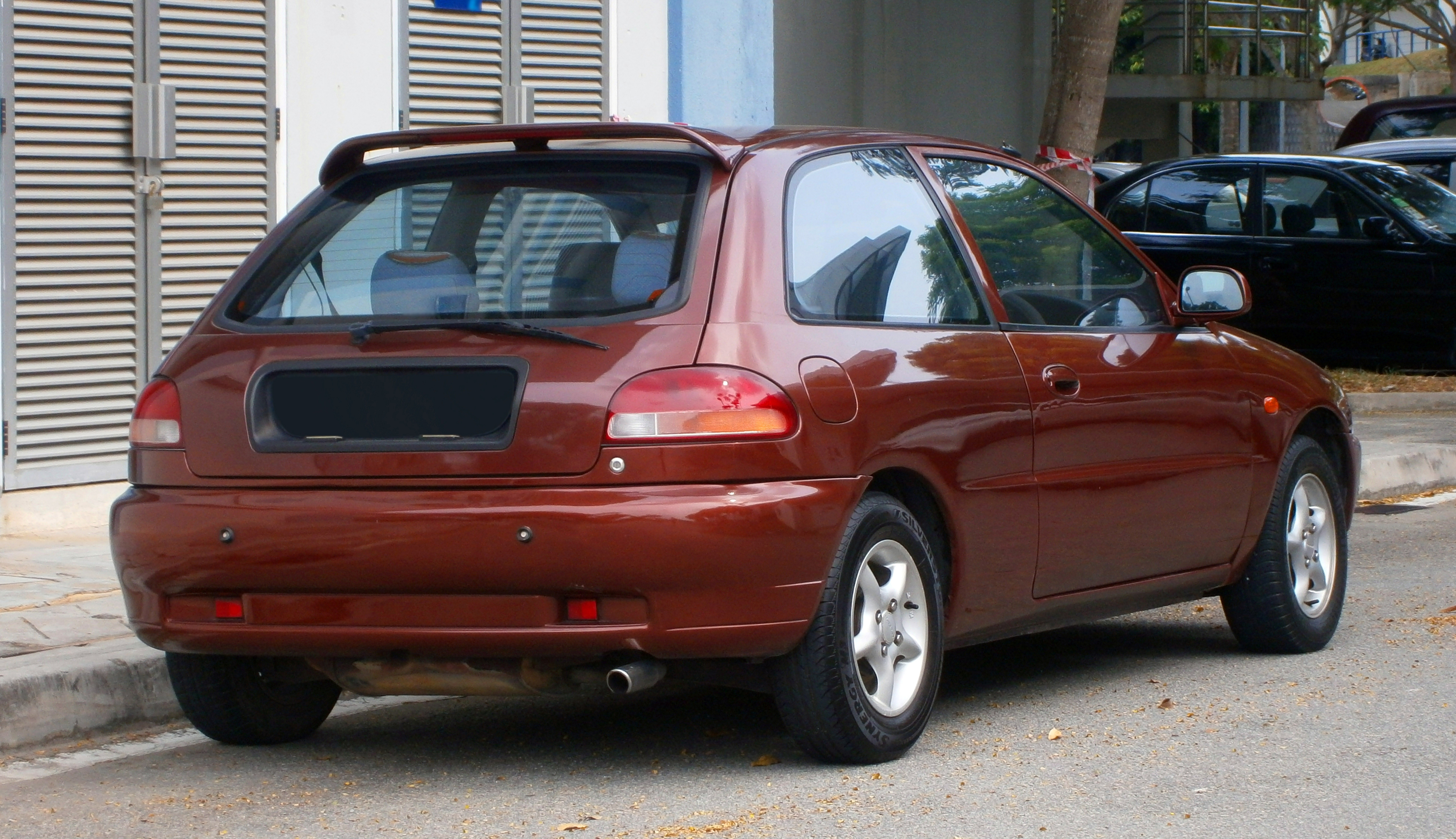
Proton Persona Compact (3-door)

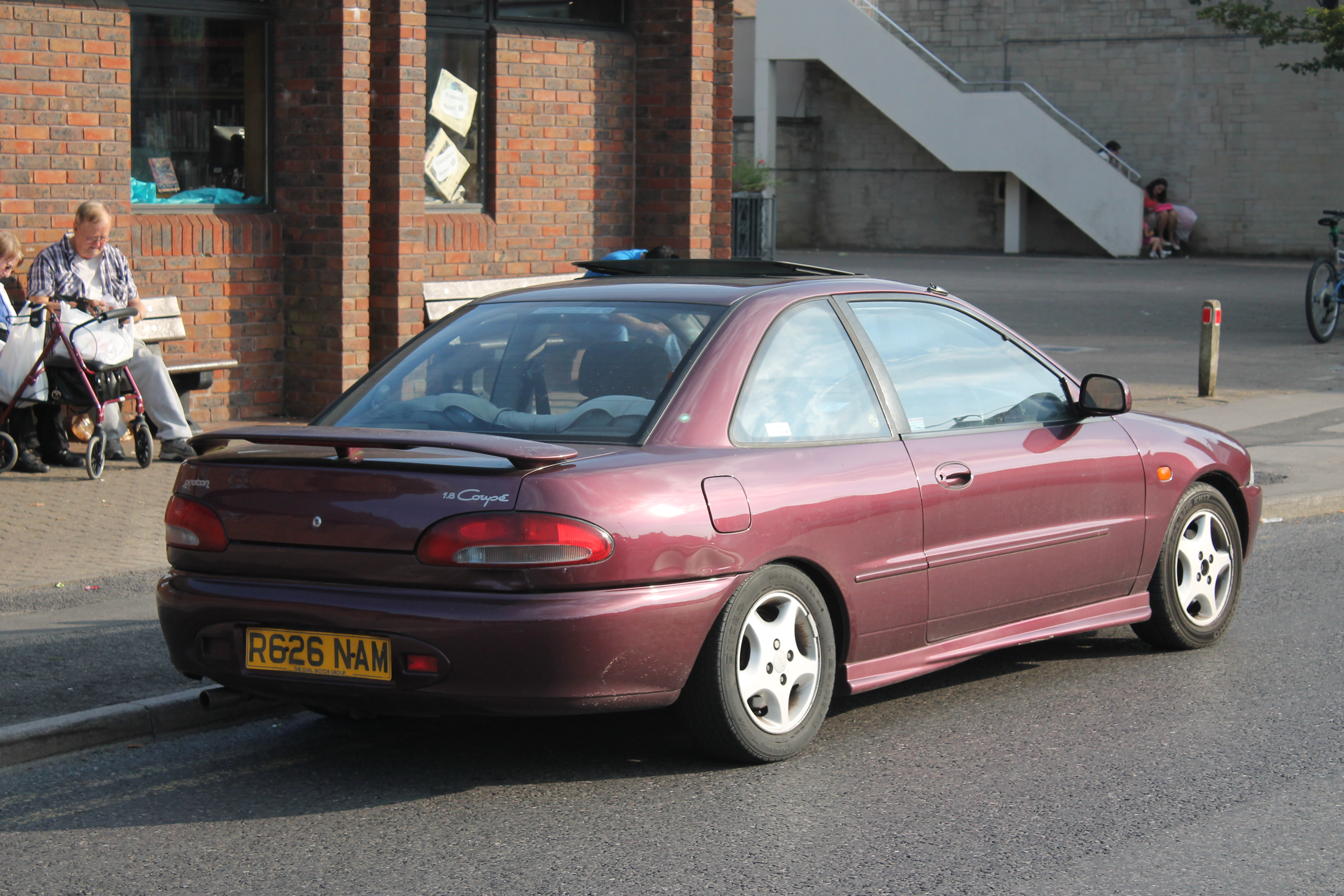
Proton Persona Coupé (2-door)

== Second generation (CM6; 2007) ==
Proton Persona
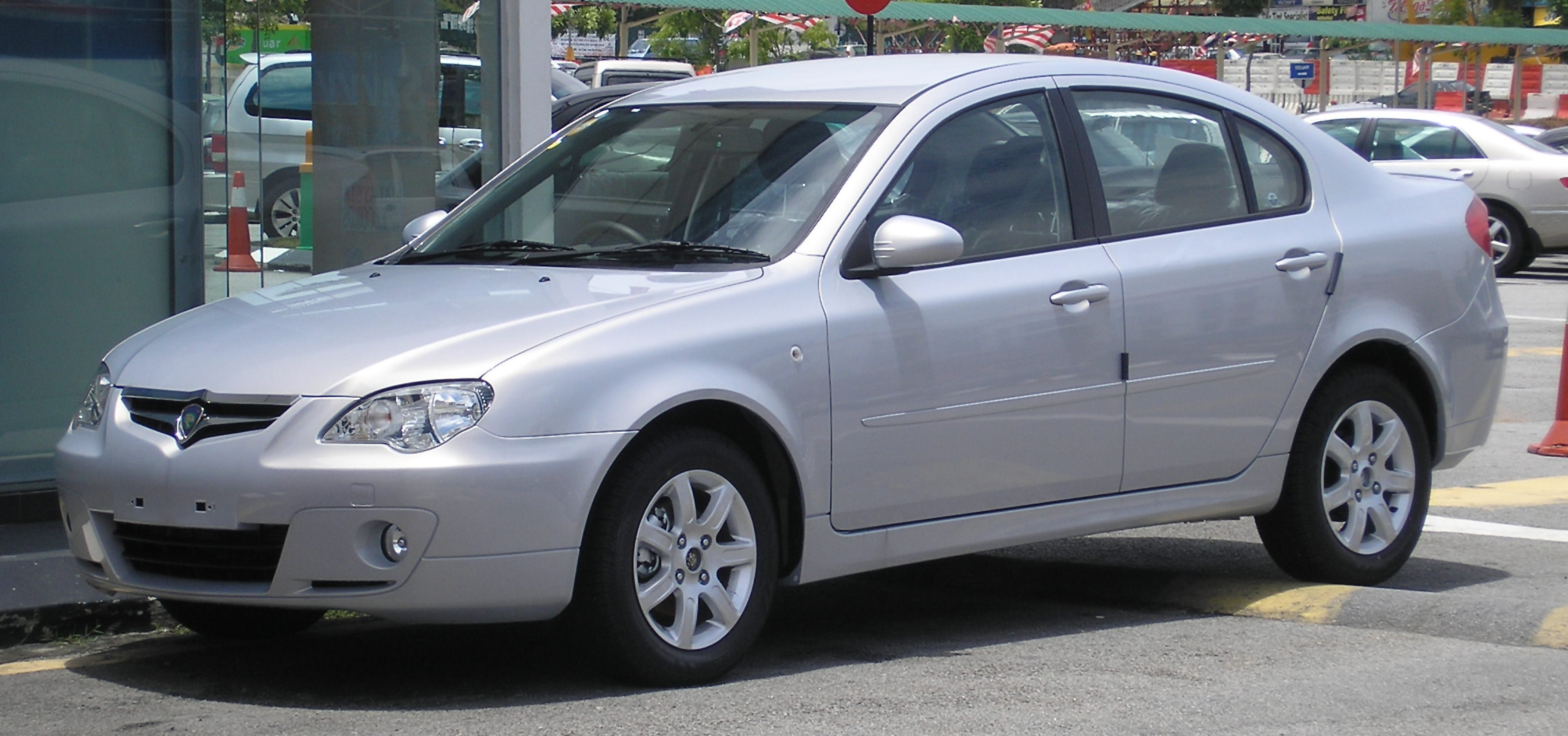

Overview
- Model code: CM
- Also called: Proton GEN•2 Persona
- Production: August 2007 – August 2016

Body and chassis
- Class: Compact car (C)
- Body style: 4-door saloon

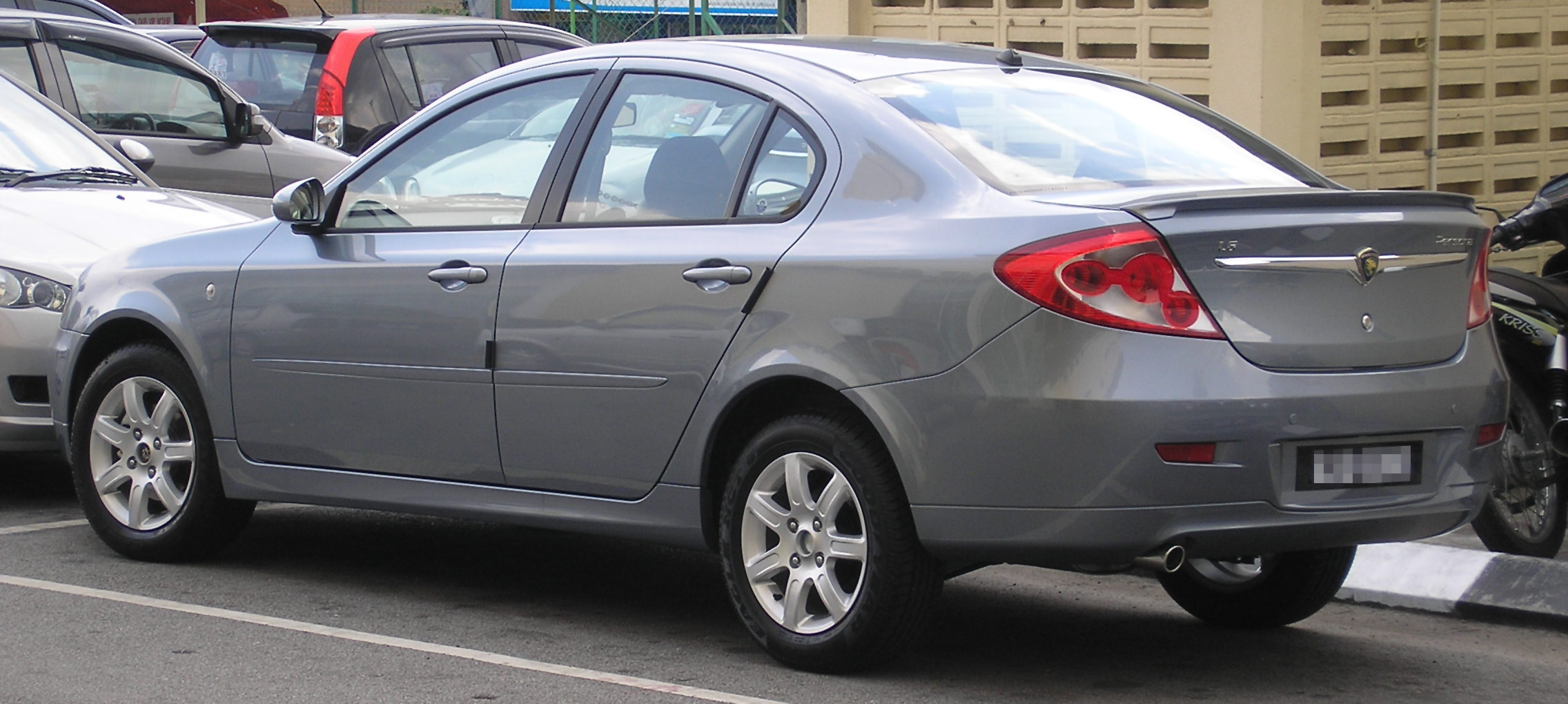
2007–2010 Proton Persona (CM)

The second generation Proton Persona (CM) was unveiled on 15 August 2007. It is the first Proton model to use the 'Persona' nameplate in its home market.

The CM Persona is based on an extended Proton GEN•2 platform, and was sold as a saloon complement to the GEN•2 hatchback. The entire section aft of the B-pillar was re-engineered, and many of the GEN•2's flaws were addressed. Early models of the CM Persona were fitted with the 1.6-litre CamPro S4PH engine, but later models received the improved CamPro IAFM unit. The CM Persona would become a best-seller for Proton, selling over 40,000 units annually prior to the launch of the Proton Prevé.

Proton launched the Persona SE on 26 August 2008. It was pitched as a premium version of the existing CM Persona with exclusive kit and luxury equipment. The CM Persona received a major facelift in March 2010 with the launch of the Persona Elegance. The changes were largely cosmetic, and would set the Persona's exterior styling for the next six years.

The final update to the CM series, the Persona SV, was launched in November 2013. The SV brought prices down and standardised all-round disc brakes and twin airbags.

== Third generation (BH6; 2016) ==
Proton Persona
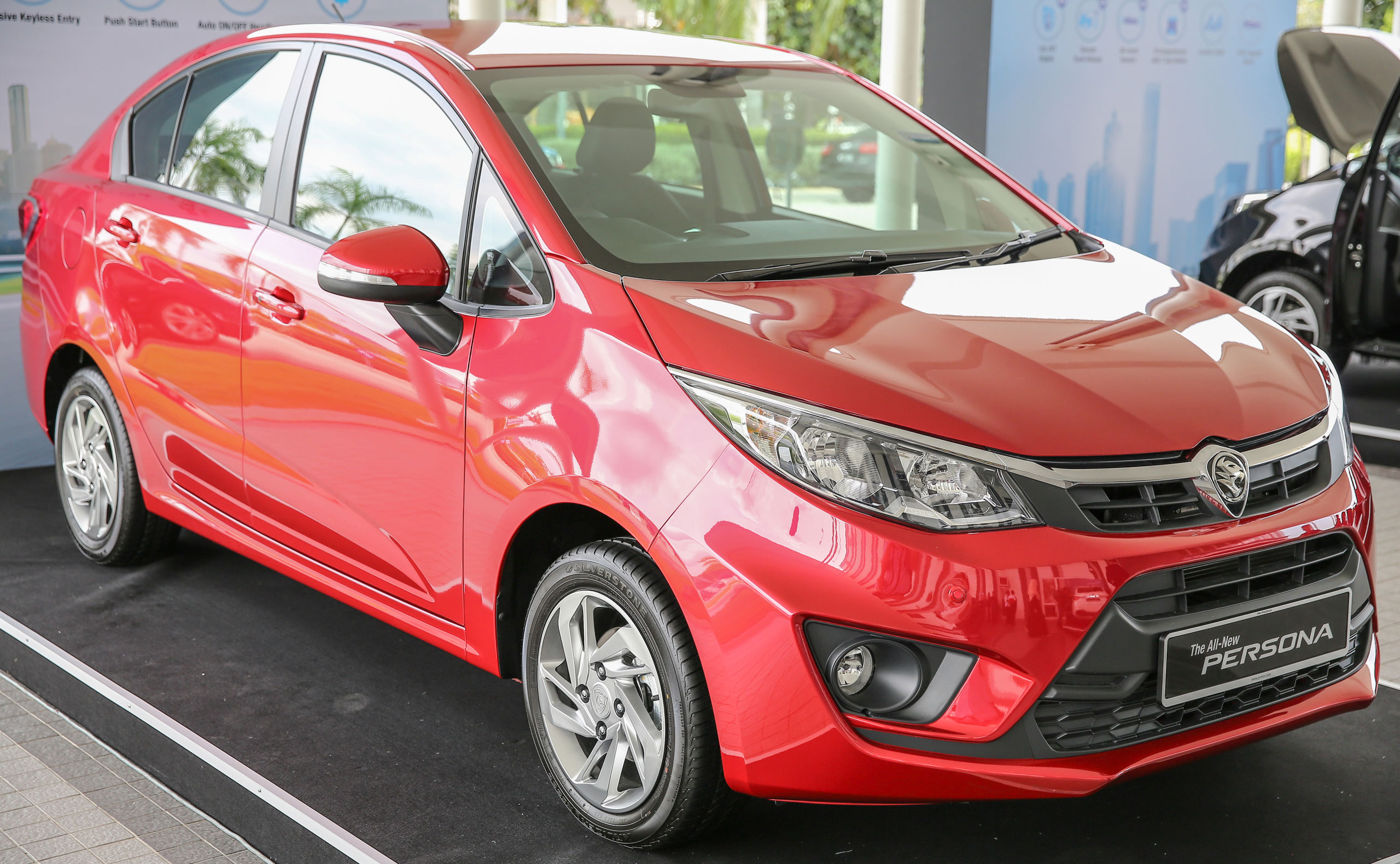

Overview
- Model code: BH
- Production: August 2016 – 2026

Body and chassis
- Class: Subcompact car (B)
- Body style: 4-door saloon

The third generation Proton Persona (BH) was launched in August 2016. It is based on an extended Proton Iriz platform and shares the latter's 1.6-litre VVT engine and basic structure, but its exterior design has been completely re-engineered to give it a distinct persona. The interior of the BH Persona is largely unchanged over the Iriz, with the main exception of the new two-tier colour scheme.

The BH Persona is one class smaller than the outgoing CM Persona, but it offers more headroom, comparable rear legroom and a significantly larger boot. The new BH is also more powerful, fuel efficient and sophisticated than the old CM.

It is the latest model which Proton promoted as having 'affordable safety' as a unique selling point, and all BH Persona variants have been awarded the full five-star rating by ASEAN NCAP.

On 23 April 2019, Proton launched a facelifted version of the Persona alongside the Iriz. Proton claimed that both cars had over 300 parts changed and improved. As of 18 February 2021, a black edition of the Persona was launched virtually on Facebook.

On 5 August 2021, Proton had its second facelift, along with Proton Iriz with the new variant, Iriz Active. Also featuring an updated design and kit count, the 2022 Proton Persona has also received a revised safety rating. Like its Iriz sibling, the Persona was also tested again in 2020 and received a full five stars in the ASEAN NCAP crash test.

== Sales ==
| Year | Malaysia (Note: Figures based on registration) |
|---|---|
| 2007 | 17,440 |
| 2008 | 41,904 |
| 2009 | 41,987 |
| 2010 | 43,212 |
| 2011 | 46,362 |
| 2012 | 27,693 |
| 2013 | 18,997 |
| 2014 | 21,117 |
| 2015 | 6,403 |
| 2016 | 15,389 |
| 2017 | 19,509 |
| 2018 | 16,946 |
| 2019 | 21,875 |
| 2020 | 23,815 |
| 2021 | 16,140 |
| 2022 | 16,256 |
| 2023 | 24,332 |
