= Proton Gen 2 =

Compact 5-door liftback vehicle

Proton GEN•2
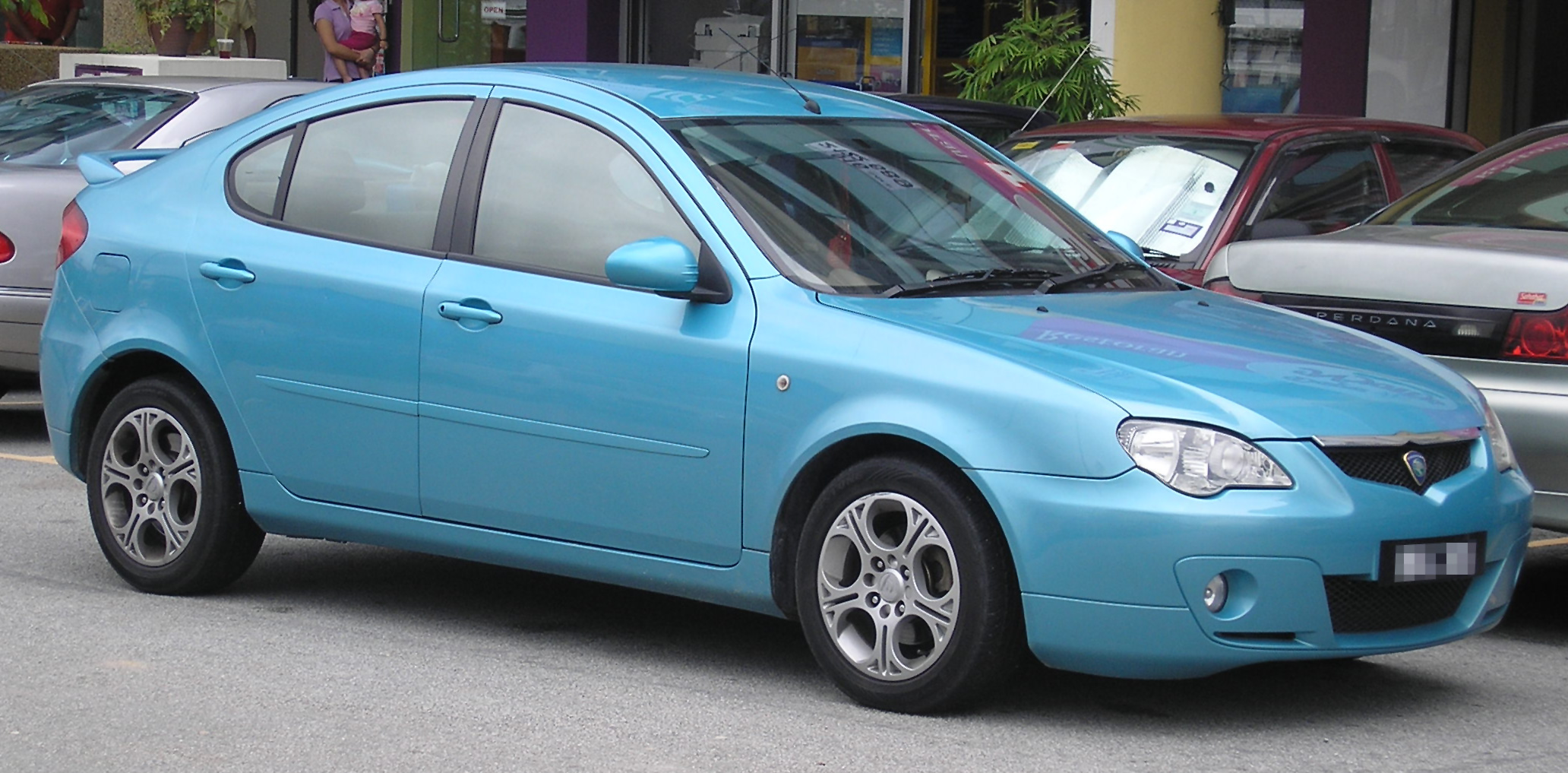

Overview
- Manufacturer: Proton
- Also called: Europestar/Lotus/Youngman L3 (China)
- Production: February 2004 – 2012
- Assembly: Malaysia: Proton City, Perak (Proton Tanjung Malim Sdn Bhd) (2004–2012, domestic & export 2013–2015, 2018-present; export only); China: Jinhua, Zhejiang (Youngman, CKD); Iran: Borujerd, Lorestan (Zagross Khodro, CKD)

Body and chassis
- Class: Compact car (C)
- Body style: 5-door Liftback
- Layout: Front-engine, front-wheel drive
- Related: Proton Persona

Powertrain
- Engine: 1.3 L CamPro S4PE DOHC I4; 1.5 L 4G15 I4 (China); 1.6 L CamPro S4PH MPFI DOHC I4; 1.6 L CamPro IAFM DOHC I4; 1.6 L CamPro CPS DOHC I4
- Transmission: 4-speed automatic 5-speed manual

Dimensions
- Wheelbase: 2,600 mm (102.4 in)
- Length: 4,310 mm (169.7 in)
- Width: 1,725 mm (67.9 in)
- Height: 1,435 mm (56.5 in)
- Kerb weight: 1,195–1,245 kg (2,635–2,745 lb)

Chronology
- Predecessor: Proton Wira Aeroback
- Successor: Proton Suprima S

The Proton GEN•2 (often simplified as Gen-2 or GEN2) is a compact 5-door liftback manufactured by Malaysian automobile manufacturer Proton which launched in 2004. It was initially codenamed Wira Replacement Model (WRM). The GEN•2 uses a platform which was expensively developed in house by Proton and technical partner Lotus. This platform was later adapted for the Proton Satria Neo and Proton Persona.

The GEN•2 was among the first models to be produced at Proton's Tanjung Malim plant, developed as part of the Proton City project. Although domestic sales of the GEN•2 was discontinued in 2012, Proton continues to produce the GEN•2 exclusively for export markets as of 2018.

== Etymology ==
The name GEN•2 is an abbreviation of Generation 2, as it served as the replacement to the Proton Wira Aeroback subcompact vehicle.

== History ==
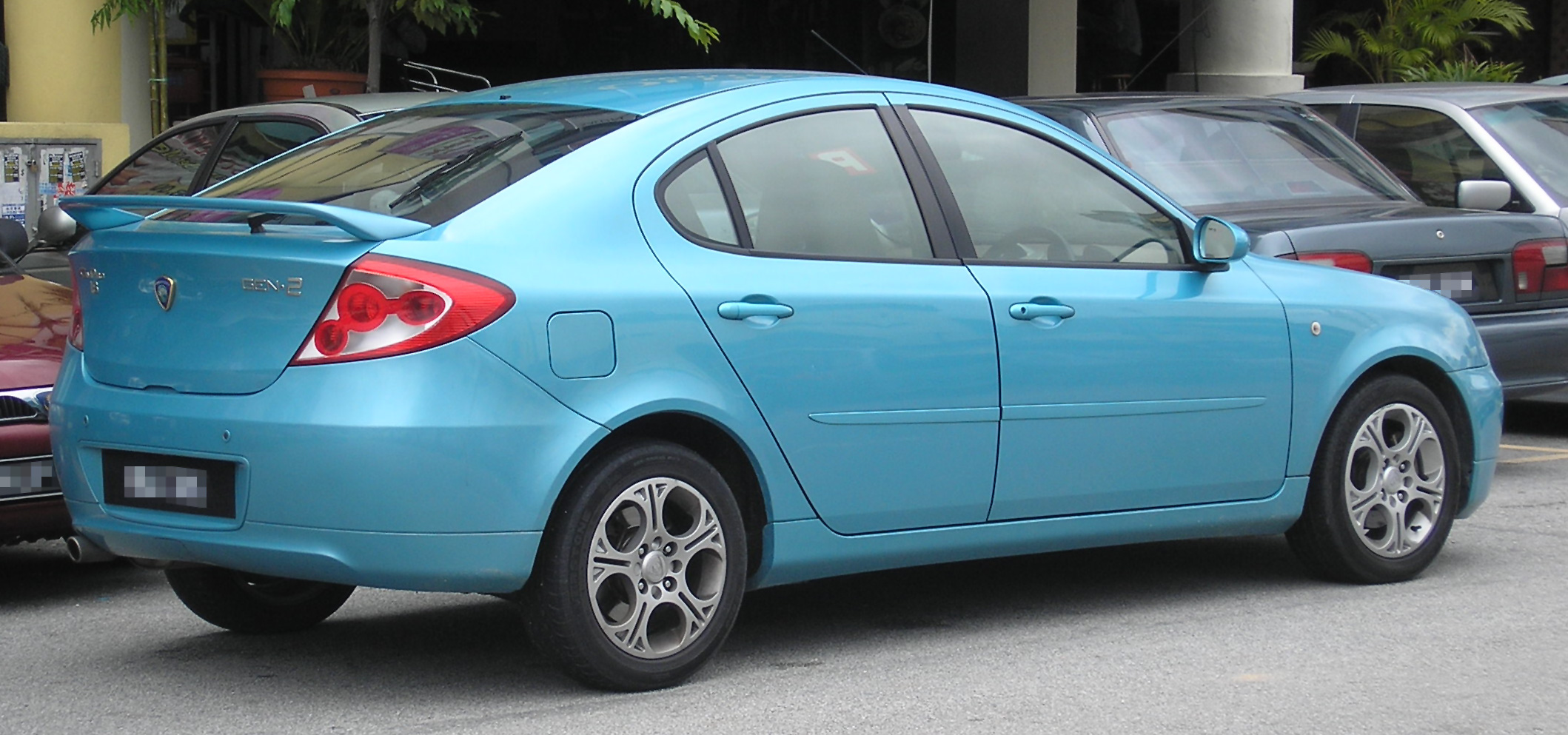
2004–2007 Proton GEN•2 in Seri Kembangan, Malaysia.

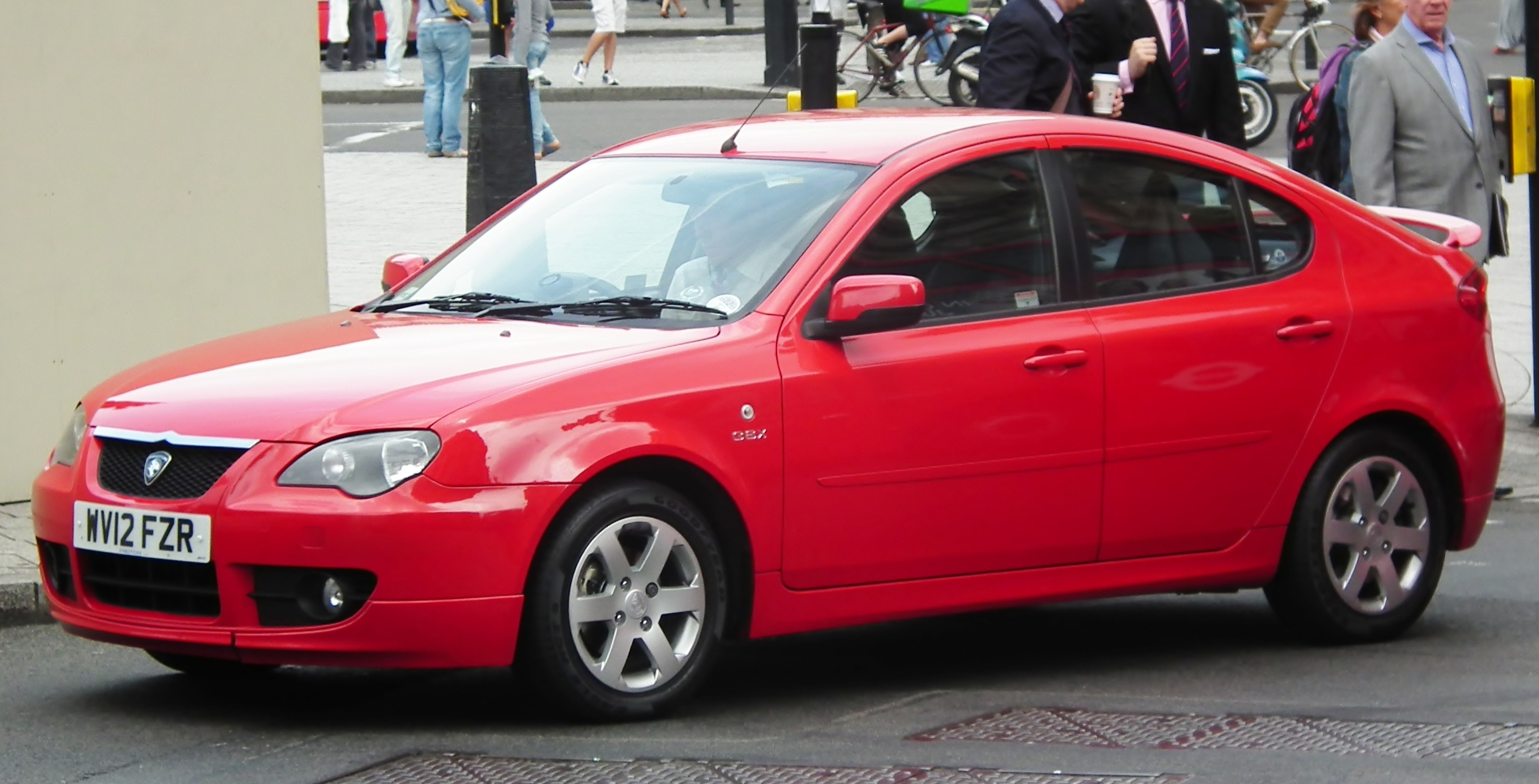
2008–2013 Proton GEN•2 in Trafalgar Square, London. The U.K. is the only market to receive the unique dual-fuel GEN•2 ecoLogic.

The Proton GEN•2 was launched in the third quarter of 2004 in Malaysia, where it became the first Proton to utilise an indigenously designed platform and engine. The CamPro (an abbreviation for Camshaft Profiling) engine and platform were both developed by Proton and Lotus Cars.

The Proton GEN•2 was first available with a 1.6 litre CamPro engine which produced 110 horsepower (82 kW) at 6,000rpm and 148Nm of torque at 4,000rpm, but in August 2005, it was complemented by a no frills 1.3 litre CamPro variant which output 95 hp at 6,000rpm and 120Nm of torque at 4,000rpm.

The GEN•2 was styled by Proton's Australian educated chief stylist Damian Chia. He drew inspiration from the traditional Malay kite known as wau bulan and the handle of the Malay dagger, the kris, in shaping the unique grille of the GEN•2. Chia also gave the new car what he described as tiger like eyes for a more forceful frontal appearance.

In July 2005, the GEN•2 R3 concept car was introduced at Dreamcars Asia Motorshow 2005. It was equipped with various aftermarket parts from Recaro, MOMO and Proton's own Race, Rally, Research (R3) division. Only 500 examples were made as a commitment to exclusivity and individuality.

In August the following year, Proton released another limited-edition model called the GEN•2 Merdeka Millennium Edition (MME) in commemoration of Proton's R3 Amprex victory at the 2005 Merdeka Millennium Endurance race. The GEN•2 MME was limited to 200 units and featured slightly improved performance, an in car entertainment system, custom rims and a body kit.

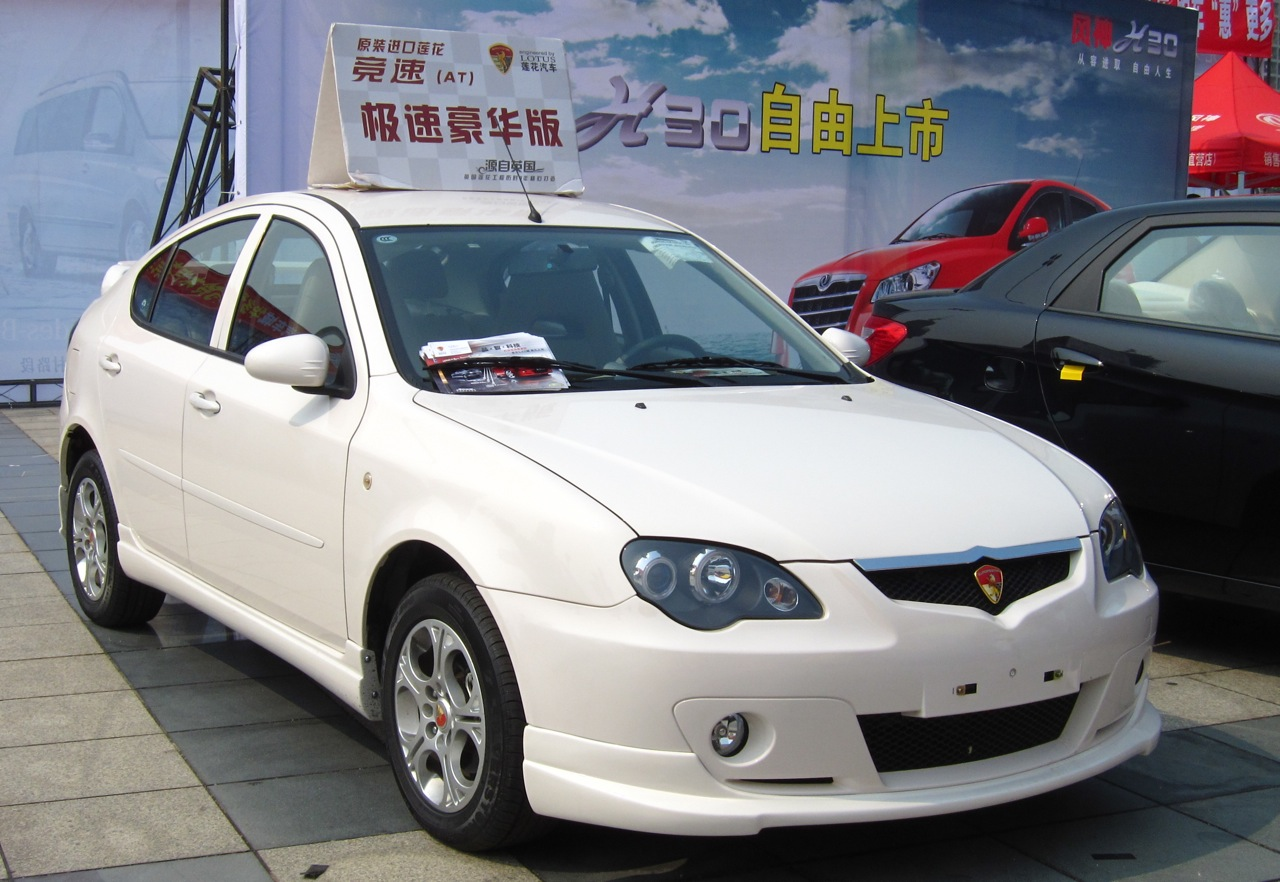
Youngman Europestar RCR in China. The facelift model was known as the Europestar L3 5-door.

The Proton GEN•2 EVE Hybrid Concept was unveiled at the 2007 Geneva Motor Show. EVE stood for Efficient, Viable, Environmental and it was primarily designed by Lotus Engineering with support from Proton. This concept car was powered by a CamPro 1.6 engine paired to a 30 kW (40 hp) electric motor. It also featured a continuously variable transmission, smart start-stop ignition and regenerative braking technology.

The GEN•2 EVE offered lower carbon dioxide emissions (134g/km, reduced from 172g/km), a 28% increase in fuel efficiency (50.2 MPG) and a higher power output (141 hp and 233Nm/1,500 rpm). Although this concept car never made it into production, certain elements such as the CVT gearbox did and a CamPro hybrid engine is currently under development.

Proton entered the Chinese market in 2007, under a strategic partnership with China's Youngman Automobile Group. The deal involved a minimum of 30,000 Proton GEN•2 CBU cars that were rebadged in China under the Europestar brand.

Proton set foot in the Thai market on 1 December 2007, with the mid life facelift of the Proton GEN•2.

The GEN•2 facelift was launched in the Malaysian market in March the following year. It was sold in two trim lines, the High Line and Medium Line respectively. Proton introduced two new engines for the GEN•2; the High- Line featured the CamPro CPS 1.6 litre engine (where CPS stood for Camshaft Profile Switching) which produced 125 horsepower (93 kW) at 6,500rpm, and 150Nm of torque at 4,500rpm.

The CamPro CPS incorporated variable valve timing and variable length intake manifold (VIM) technology to boost maximum power and remedy the undesirable torque dip which plagued the older CamPro engines. The Medium- Line was powered by the 1.6L CamPro IAFM (Intake Air-Fuel Module) which produced 110 horsepower (82 kW) at 6,000rpm and 148Nm of torque at 4,000rpm.

The CamPro IAFM was essentially a basic dual overhead cam CamPro engine equipped with a variable length intake manifold (VIM). However, the VIM technology used in the CamPro IAFM differed from the one used in the superior CamPro CPS. Aside from the engines, the facelifted GEN•2 was also equipped with a new front bumper, grille, rear spoiler and alloy wheels.

The interior was also updated in line with that of the Proton Persona which was released in the end of 2007. The GEN•2 HighLine came with leather upholstery, cruise control, dual SRS airbags, anti-lock brakes (ABS) and EBD, but the Medium- Line only got a driver's airbag. The GEN•2 in all its variants were priced between RM53,488 and RM60,488.

The Proton GEN•2 1.6 GSX ecoLogic was launched in the United Kingdom in August 2008. It was technically a GEN•2 converted to run on both petrol and Liquefied Petroleum Gas (LPG). The GEN•2 ecoLogic was complemented by a saloon (Proton Persona) ecoLogic variant as well.

Both dual fuel cars qualify for lower British road tax because LPG combustion produces less exhaust pollutants. Furthermore, the Proton-approved conversion is covered by the vehicle warranty (unlike aftermarket conversions), and both hatchback and saloon ecoLogic models retailed at £11,195 (~RM 54,250).

On 20 May 2010, Proton introduced the final update for the GEN•2 with two variants available: Medium-Line (auto only) and High-Line (manual and auto). It received mild exterior and interior changes, with the most distinctive feature being the black roof. The Medium- Line trim was upgraded to incorporate the more powerful CamPro CPS 1.6 engine, previously reserved for High- Line variants. The updated GEN•2 also received a price drop and was sold in three colours; Fire Red, Genetic silver and Solid White. The last Proton GEN•2s for the Malaysian market were sold in 2012.

== Export Markets ==
The Proton GEN•2 was widely exported via Proton's worldwide dealer networks. It was sold in the United Kingdom, Ireland, Turkey, Romania, South Africa, Australia, Singapore, Thailand, Indonesia, and Egypt among other markets.

An agreement was inked between Proton and Iranian distributor Zagross Khodro in December 2008, for CKD assembly of the Proton GEN•2 in Iran. It enabled the car to be more competitively priced in that market. GEN•2 models sold in export markets from 2011 onwards are equipped with the Proton Persona's L.E.D. tail lights, which help give the GEN•2 a more modern appearance.

Proton discontinued sales of the GEN•2 in Malaysia in 2012. However, Proton still produces the GEN•2 at their Tanjung Malim factory for exclusive sale to their export markets. Proton produced 1,148 GEN•2s in 2012 and a further 1,489 in 2013. Production of the GEN•2 stopped momentarily in November 2013, but resumed in July 2014 due to higher demand from some export markets, chiefly Egypt and Turkey.

Proton sold 682 units in 2012 and an additional 715 GEN•2s and Personas in 2013 in Turkey, as well as 496 and 593 GEN•2 units in 2012 and 2013 respectively in Egypt. Sales of the GEN•2 and Persona continue to increase in both markets. Between January and September 2014, 625 GEN•2s were sold in Egypt, and between January and November 2014, 562 GEN•2s and Personas were sold in Turkey.

The Proton GEN•2 was launched in Pakistan in September 2006; it was available in five variants: 1.3 M/T, 1.3 M/T (CNG), 1.3 A/T, 1.6 M/T and 1.6 M/T (CNG). Proton pulled out of Pakistan only a few years later.

In Indonesia, the facelifted Proton GEN.2 come with only the Campro IAFM engine and was sold in two variants: M/T and A/T. It was available in seven different colors: Tranquility Black, Metal Grey, Genetic Silver, Energy Orange, Solid Red, Passion Blue and Solid White. It came with a 3-year or 100,000 km warranty.

On 12 July 2018, 440 Proton GEN•2s were exported to the Middle East.

== Other Developments ==
The Youngman Europestar L5 was launched at the 2011 Shanghai Motorshow. It was based on an extended GEN•2 platform (2,670mm, 70mm longer than the original) which was developed by Lotus and Youngman. It was also powered by Proton's CamPro CPS 1.6 litre engine which produced 125 bhp and 150Nm of torque. The Europestar L5 was available in hatchback and saloon variants priced between RMB98,000 and RMB122,000 (~RM48,700 - RM60,600).

The Proton GEN•2 was one of two models (the other being the Proton Savvy) that MG Rover was looking to rebadge when it entered talks with Proton. Unfortunately, negotiations ended shortly before the GEN•2's launch of September 2004 in the United Kingdom. MG Rover was eventually purchased by China's Nanjing Automobile in July 2005.

The American company Detroit Electric and Proton Holdings Berhad signed an agreement in March 2009. The RM1.2 billion (USD$331 million) deal was to involve the annual production of 40,000 to 100,000 Proton GEN•2 (e46) and Proton Persona (e63) electric vehicles (EV).

The cars were to be powered by an electric motor which could produce 150 kW (200 bhp) and 350 to 380Nm of torque. Its maximum projected range was 320 km (199 miles) on a 40kWh battery. The Detroit Electric e63 and e46 was targeted for sale in the United States, Europe and China. Prototype models were made in 2008, but commercial production was non existent. In January 2011, another updated prototype was caught in action, but no official announcements were made by Proton or Detroit Electric. The GEN•2 was phased out in 2012, and it is presumed that the agreement is no longer valid as of 2013.

== Safety ==
Safety features (selected markets) (Note: Legend Blue : Standard across all trim levels. Green : Available on selected trim level(s) only, full package. Yellow : Available on selected trim level(s) only, but is not the full package. Red : Not available on selected trim level(s), or is the no-frills package.)
Highest specifications offered
Market	(Thailand)	(China)	(Malaysia)	(Singapore)	(South Africa)	(United Arab Emirates)	(United Kingdom)	(New Zealand)	(Australia)
ABS with EBD	✔								
BA, TCS and ESC	✘								
Airbags	2				4				

- (European Union) - Euro NCAP (equivalent) -

The Proton GEN•2 has not been officially tested by the European New Car Assessment Programme (Euro NCAP), but it has nonetheless been assessed at the Applus+ IDIADA crash testing facility in Spain, and is claimed to have scored an equivalent three star Euro NCAP rating.

The car is also designed to UNECE, ADR and GCC standards.

All Proton GEN•2s were equipped with a driver's airbag as a minimum requirement, and more expensive trim variants were offered with a front passenger airbag as well. However, the highest trim lines of the Proton GEN•2 sold in certain developed markets such as the United Kingdom, New Zealand and Australia were equipped with twin side airbags, making for a grand total of 4 airbags respectively. The side airbags were never offered in Malaysian market GEN•2s.

== Powertrains ==
=== Proton GEN•2 (facelift) ===
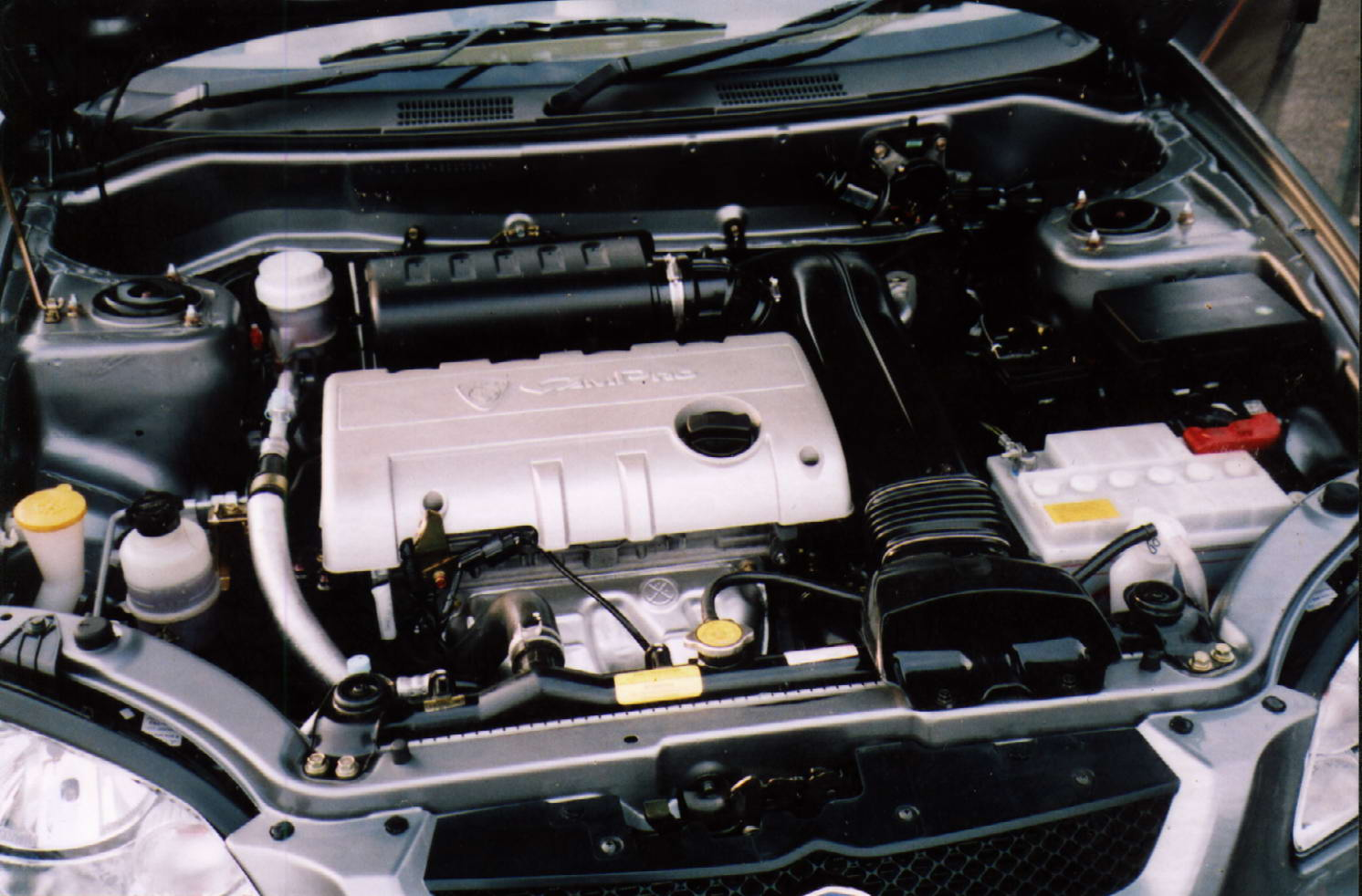
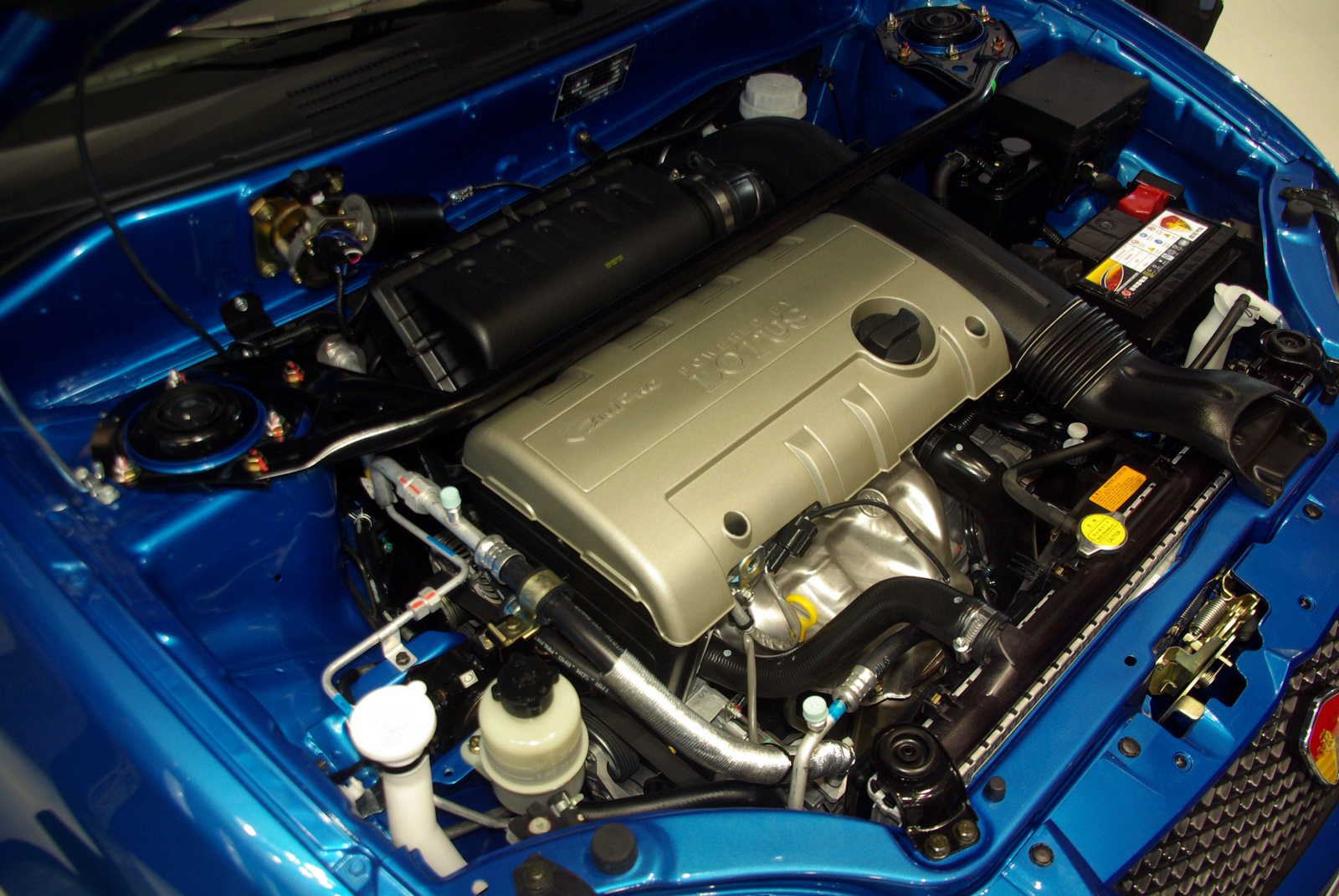
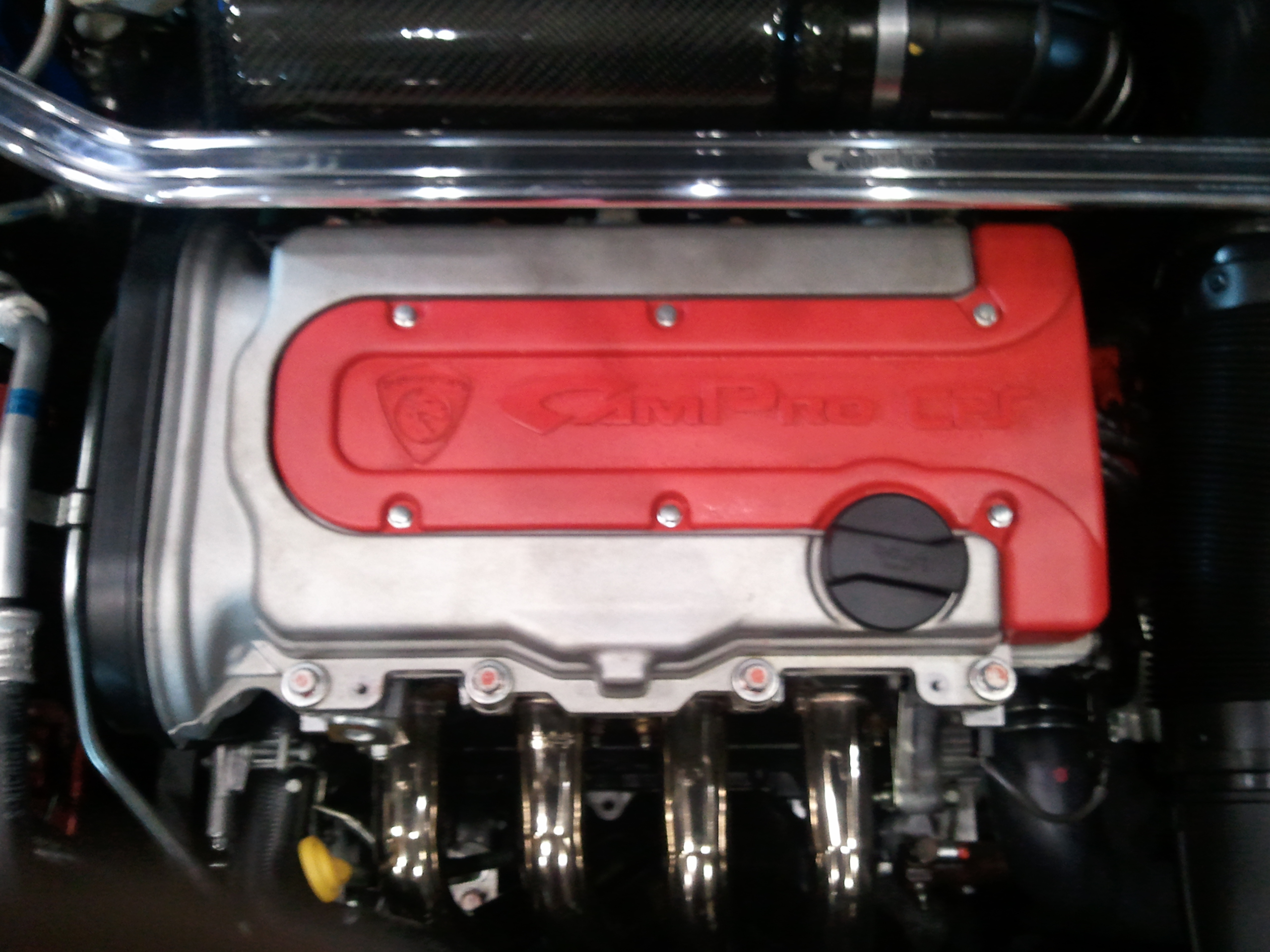
The original CamPro S4PH engine. (left)
1.6L CamPro S4PH engine in the Europestar L3. (middle)
1.6L CamPro CPS engine. (right)

Manufacturer's claims
Engine	1.6L CamPro S4PH	1.6L CamPro CPS
Format	I4 DOHC 16V	I4 DOHC 16V
Total displacement (cc)	1,597	1,597
Bore x Stroke (mm)	76.0 x 88.0	76.0 x 88.0
Maximum Output [hp(kW)/rpm]	110 (82) / 6,000	125 (93) / 6,500
Maximum Torque (Nm/rpm)	148 / 4,000	150 / 4,500
Acceleration 0–100 km/h (seconds)	N/A	10.6 (MT) / 13.2 (AT)
Fuel tank capacity (litres)	50	50

== Reception ==
The original Proton GEN•2 received poor to mixed British and Australian reviews. The most criticised aspect of the car was the interior. It lacked the necessary refinement and practicality for vehicles of its class. Additionally, the seating position was deemed impractical and the CamPro engine lacked sufficient power.

However, the exterior was praised for its modern looks and the ride and handling attributes were also favourable. The GEN•2 ecoLogic was the only model to receive fair reviews. Auto Trader gave it 2.5/5 stars, commenting on the appalling interior as well as the generally good running costs, ride comfort and handling.

The Proton GEN•2 was also featured in Top Gear, Series 5, Episode 9 which aired on 26 December 2004 in the United Kingdom. It was compared with other cars from Malaysia and South Korea, in which the GEN•2's pricing and looks were favoured by James May. However, he also commented on the GEN•2's interior, where he quoted "I'd gladly trade the Lotus-developed suspension for some Toyota-developed door trim."

== Sales ==
Year	Malaysia
2004	19,475
2005	33,535
2006	17,313
2007	9,966
2008	4,103
2009	2,051
2010	1,580
2011	651
2012	47
2013	1

== See also ==
- Proton Persona, the 4-door saloon complement.
