= Youngman Lotus L5 =

Chinese compact sedan

Youngman Lotus L5 Sportback
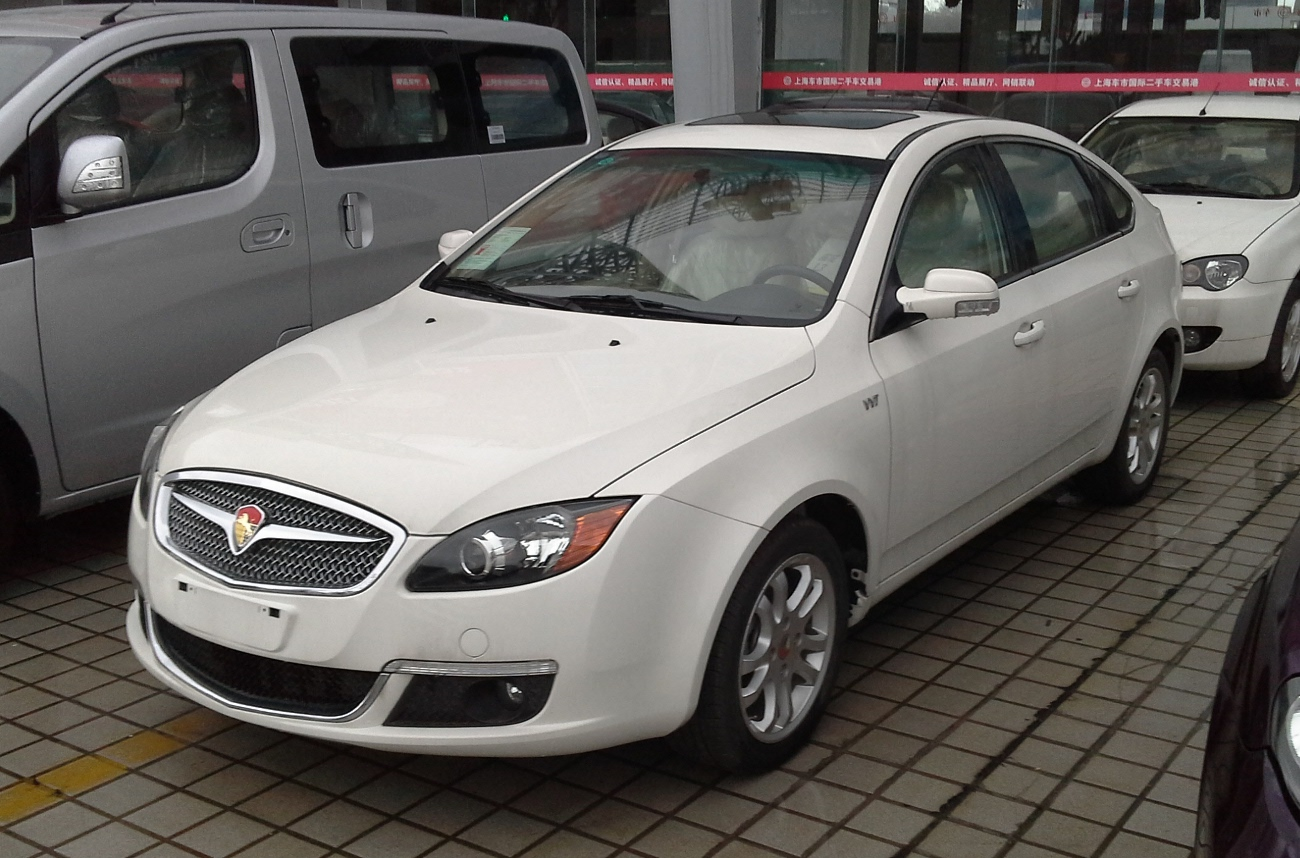

Overview
- Manufacturer: Europestar
- Production: 2010–2015
- Assembly: Jinhua, Zhejiang (Youngman)

Body and chassis
- Class: Compact car (C)
- Body style: 5-door liftback saloon (Sportback); 4-door saloon
- Layout: Front-engine, front-wheel drive
- Related: Proton Persona (CM); Proton GEN•2; Youngman Europestar L3

Powertrain
- Engine: 1.6 L CamPro S4PH I4; 1.8 L Mitsubishi I4 (Gasoline)
- Transmission: 5-speed manual 4-speed automatic

Dimensions
- Wheelbase: 2,670 mm (105.1 in)
- Length: 4,640 mm (182.7 in)
- Width: 1,750 mm (68.9 in)
- Height: 1,466 mm (57.7 in)
- Kerb weight: 1,170–1,190 kg (2,580–2,620 lb)

The Youngman Lotus L5 is a compact sedan and liftback saloon produced by Europestar, a Chinese automotive sub-brand of the British Lotus Group plc. The brand is the result of the joint-venture with the Chinese Jinhua Youngman Vehicle Co., Ltd. The brand was also known as Qingnian Kuaile (Chinese: 青年快乐(莲花), pinyin: qīngnián (liánhuā) or English: Youngman (Lotus).

== History ==
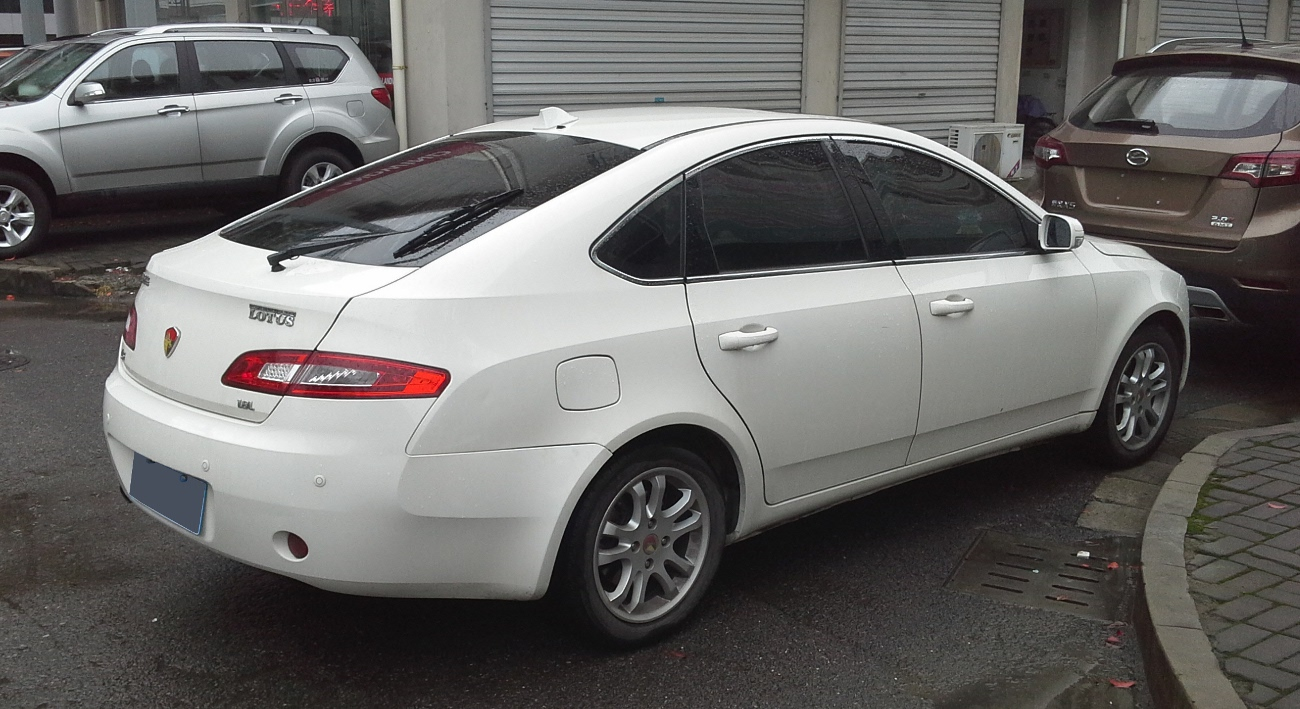
Youngman-Lotus L5 Sportback rear

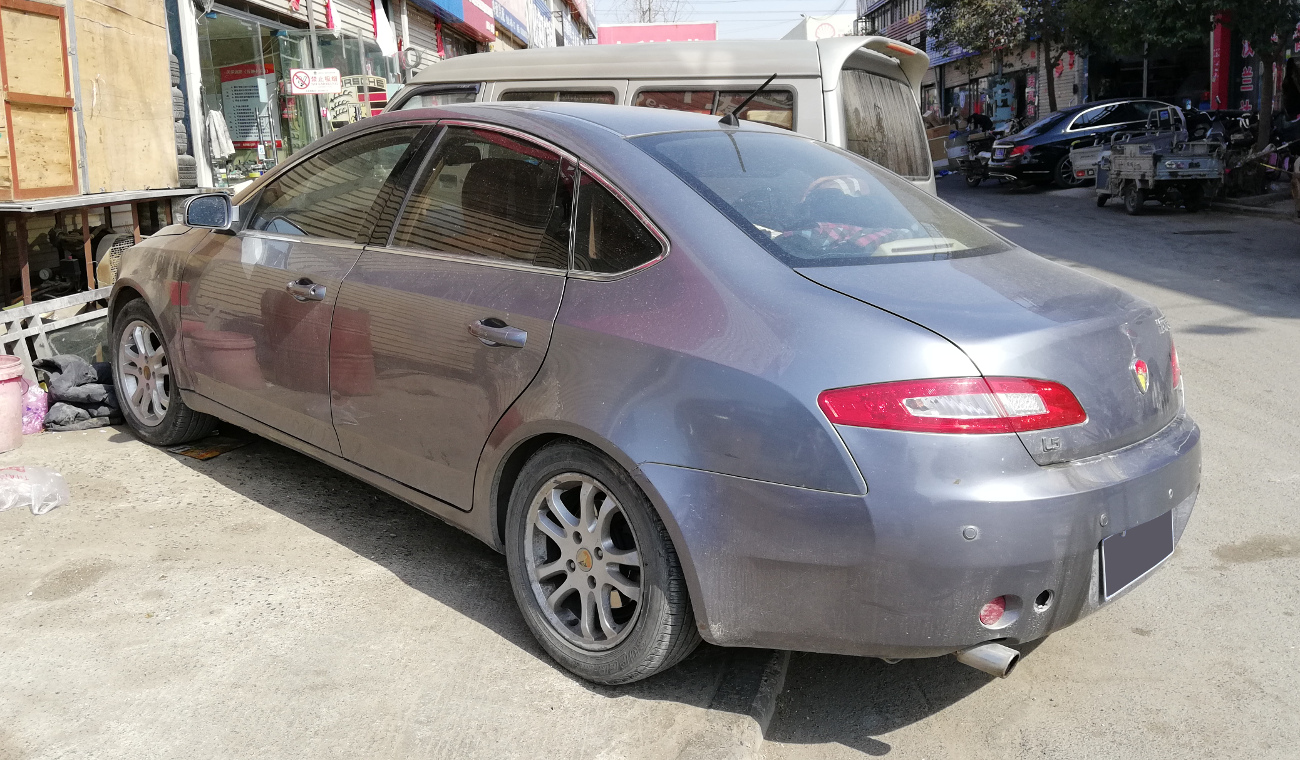
Youngman-Lotus L5 sedan rear

The Youngman Lotus L5 was first shown during the 2010 Beijing Auto Show. in April 2010 as a slightly larger compact sedan positioned above the Youngman Lotus L3 sedan and hatchback. The Youngman Lotus L5 is also based on the same platform as the Proton Gen2-based Youngman Lotus L3.

The production version of the Youngman Lotus L5 was listed in September 2011 and was priced from RMB 99,800 yuan to RMB 121,800 yuan.

The power of the Youngman Lotus L5 comes from a 1.6 liter engine with 123 hp (92 kW; 125 PS) and 149 N⋅m (110 lb⋅ft), mated to a 5-speed manual transmission or a 4-speed automatic transmission.

=== 2012 facelift ===
The Youngman Lotus L5 received a facelift for the 2012 model year and was launched on the Chinese car market in May 2012. A Mitsubishi-sourced 1.8-liter engine with 147 hp (110 kW; 149 PS) and 171 N⋅m (126 lb⋅ft) of torque replaces the 1.6-liter engine of the pre-facelift L5 model, while the engine is still mated to a 5-speed manual transmission or a 4-speed automatic transmission.

=== Youngman Lotus L5 GT ===
The Youngman Lotus L5 GT was launched on the Chinese auto market in 2013, with the original debut planned to be in April 2013 during the 2013 Shanghai Auto Show. The L5 GT debuted as a concept on the 2012 Beijing Auto Show in April 2012 and is a sporty variant of the Youngman Lotus L5. The Youngman Lotus L5 GT is powered by the same Mitsubishi-sourced 1.8-liter engine as the post-facelift L5 and produces the same power.
