= Proton Persona (2007) =

C-segment saloon car

Proton Persona (second generation)
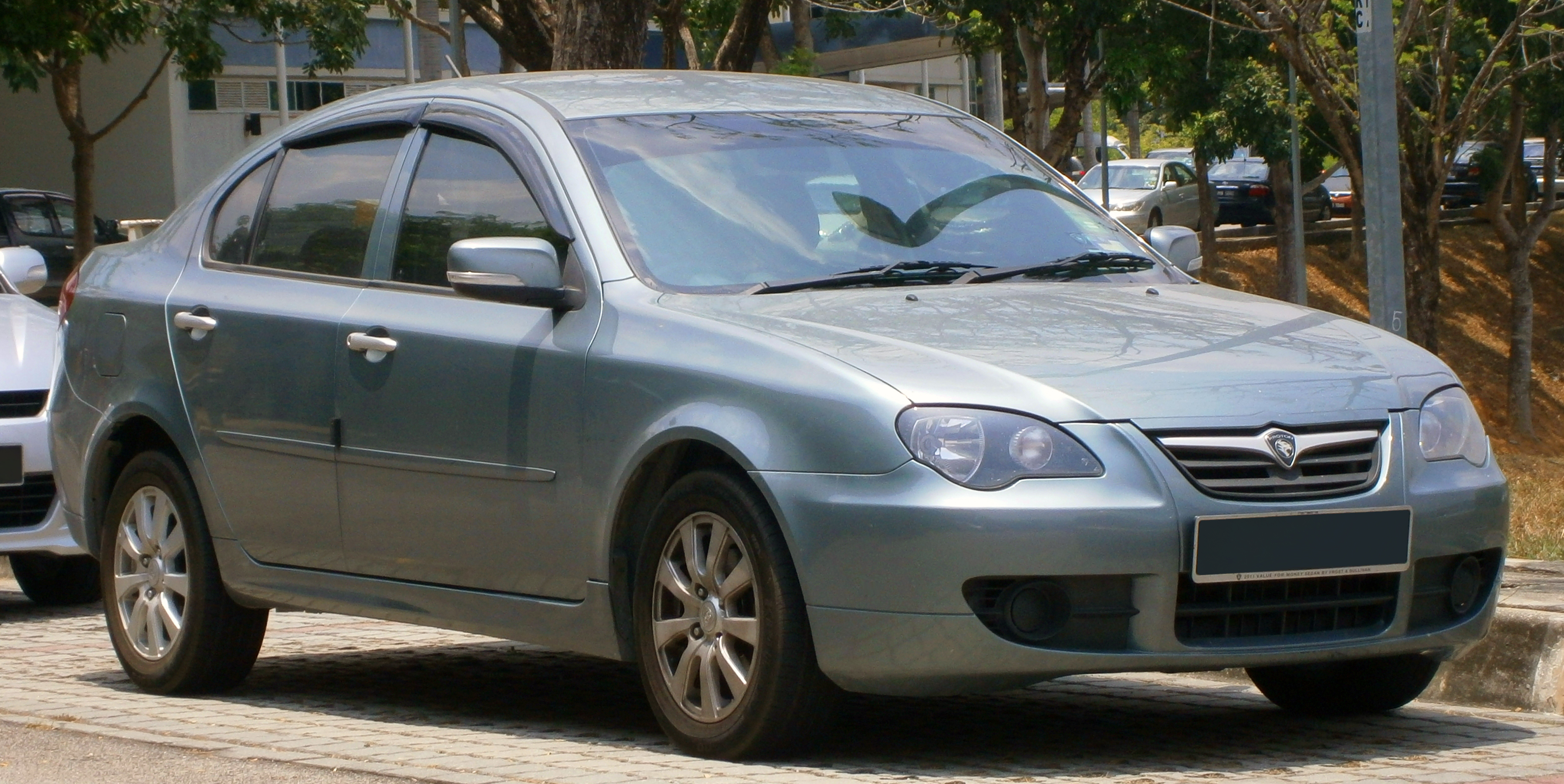
- 2013 Persona

Overview
- Manufacturer: Proton
- Model code: CM
- Also called: Youngman Lotus L3 (China); Proton Persona CNG (Thailand)
- Production: August 2007 – August 2016
- Assembly: Malaysia: Proton City (PTMSB); China: Jinhua, Zhejiang (Youngman)
- Designer: Damian Chia; Azlan Othman

Body and chassis
- Class: Compact car (C)
- Body style: 4-door saloon
- Layout: Front-engine, front-wheel drive
- Related: Proton GEN•2; Youngman Europestar L3

Powertrain
- Engine: 1.5 L 4G15 I4 (China); 1.6 L CamPro S4PH I4; 1.6 L CamPro IAFM I4 (Gasoline); 1.6 L CamPro IAFM I4 (Gasoline/CNG)
- Transmission: 5-speed manual 4-speed automatic

Dimensions
- Wheelbase: 2,600 mm (102.4 in)
- Length: 4,477 mm (176.3 in)
- Width: 1,725 mm (67.9 in)
- Height: 1,438 mm (56.6 in)
- Kerb weight: 1,170–1,190 kg (2,580–2,620 lb)

Chronology
- Predecessor: Proton Persona (C90); Proton Wira saloon
- Successor: Proton Prevé (spiritual); Proton Persona (BH) (de facto)

The second-generation Proton Persona (CM) is a C-segment saloon produced by the Malaysian automobile manufacturer Proton. The CM series represents the second generation in the Proton Persona lineage, and the first Proton model to use the 'Persona' nameplate in its home market. It was unveiled on 15 August 2007 as the successor to the Proton Wira in Malaysia, and the C90 Persona in its export markets.

The CM Persona is based on an extended Proton GEN•2 platform, and was sold as a saloon complement to the GEN•2 hatchback. The CM Persona was succeeded by the C-segment Proton Prevé in 2012. However, Proton continued to produce the Persona as a low-cost alternative to the more sophisticated Prevé. The CM Persona was later decisively succeeded by the B-segment BH Persona in August 2016.

The CM series was also sold as the Proton GEN•2 Persona in some export markets, and it is one of two Proton models that were rebadged and manufactured by the Youngman company in China. Over 250,000 CM Personas were sold over the course of nine years.

== History ==
=== Post-launch ===
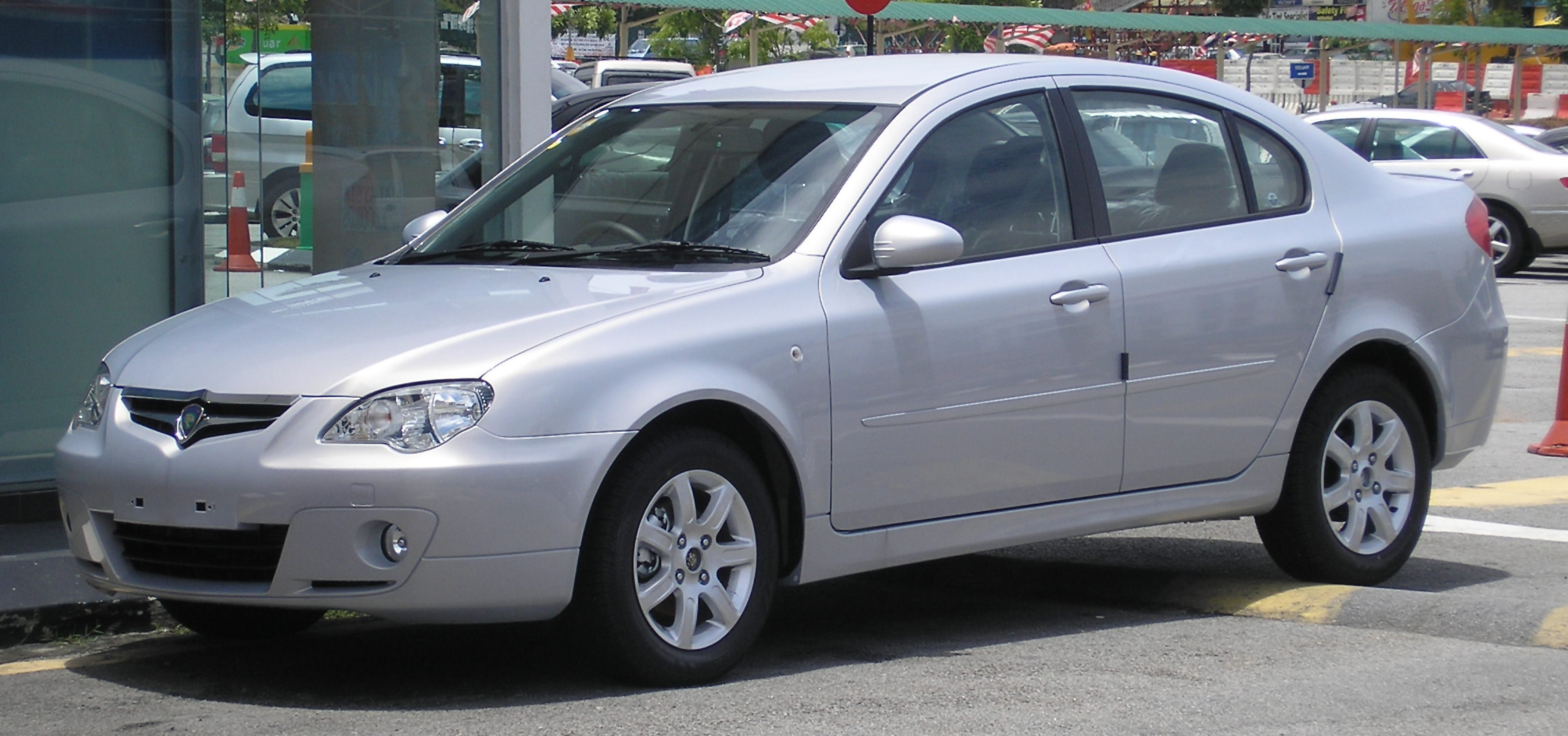
2007–2010 Proton Persona

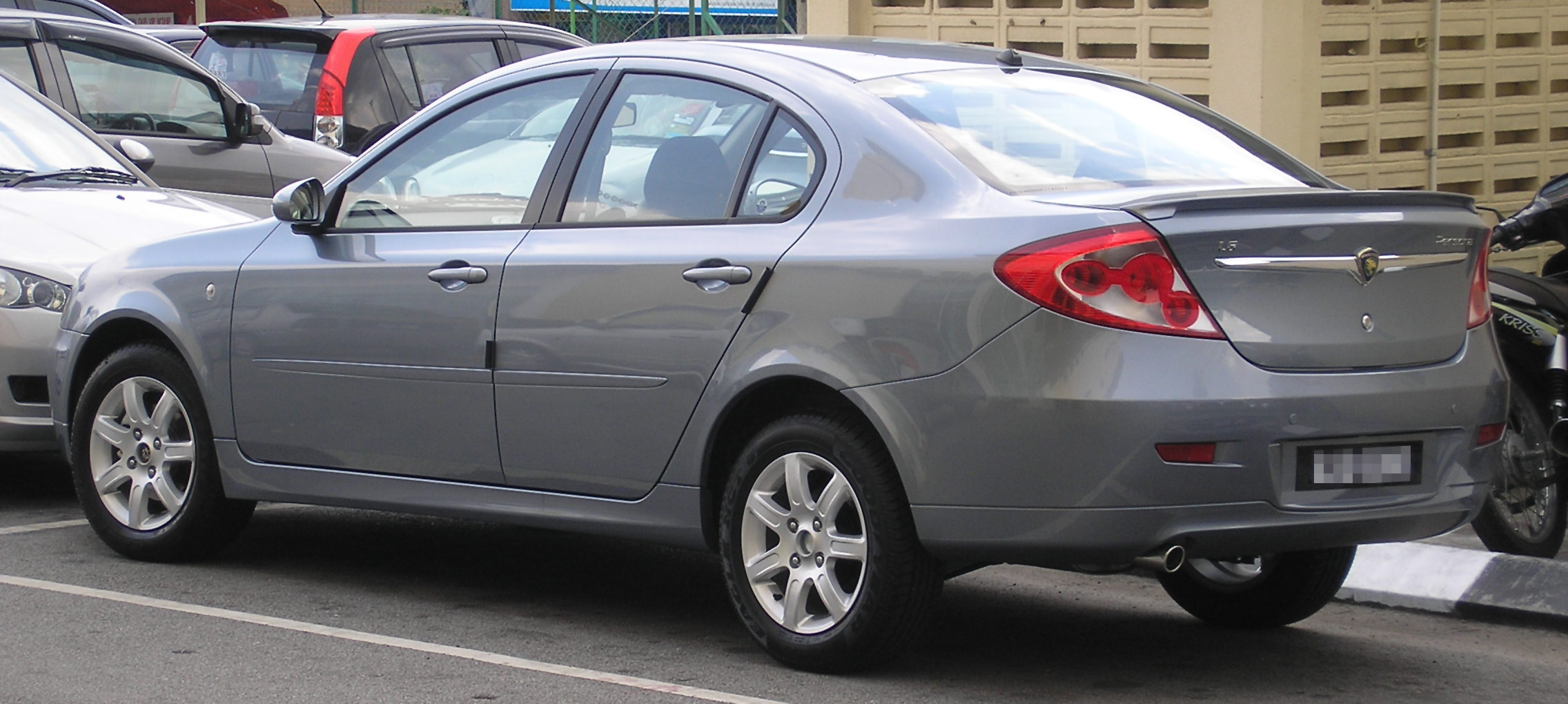
2007–2010 Proton Persona (rear view)

The Proton Persona (CM) was unveiled on 15 August 2007 as the decisive successor to Proton's ageing Wira saloon range.

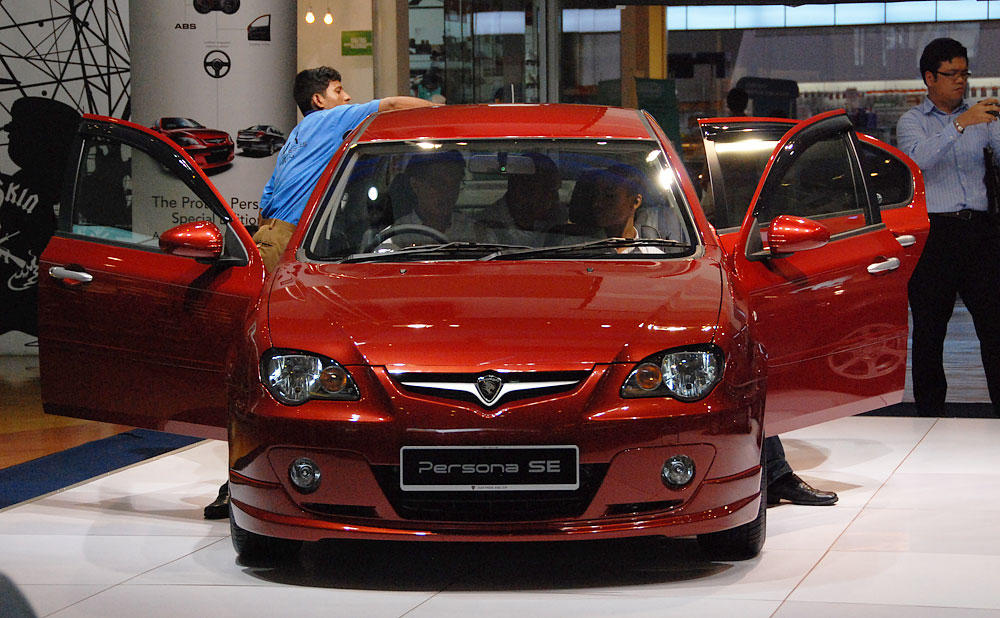
Proton Persona SE

Proton launched a special edition of the CM Persona on 26 August 2008. It was pitched as a premium version of the existing Proton Persona with exclusive kit and luxury equipment. Only two colours were available; Blue Haze and Brilliant Red respectively, and the car retailed for RM59,800.

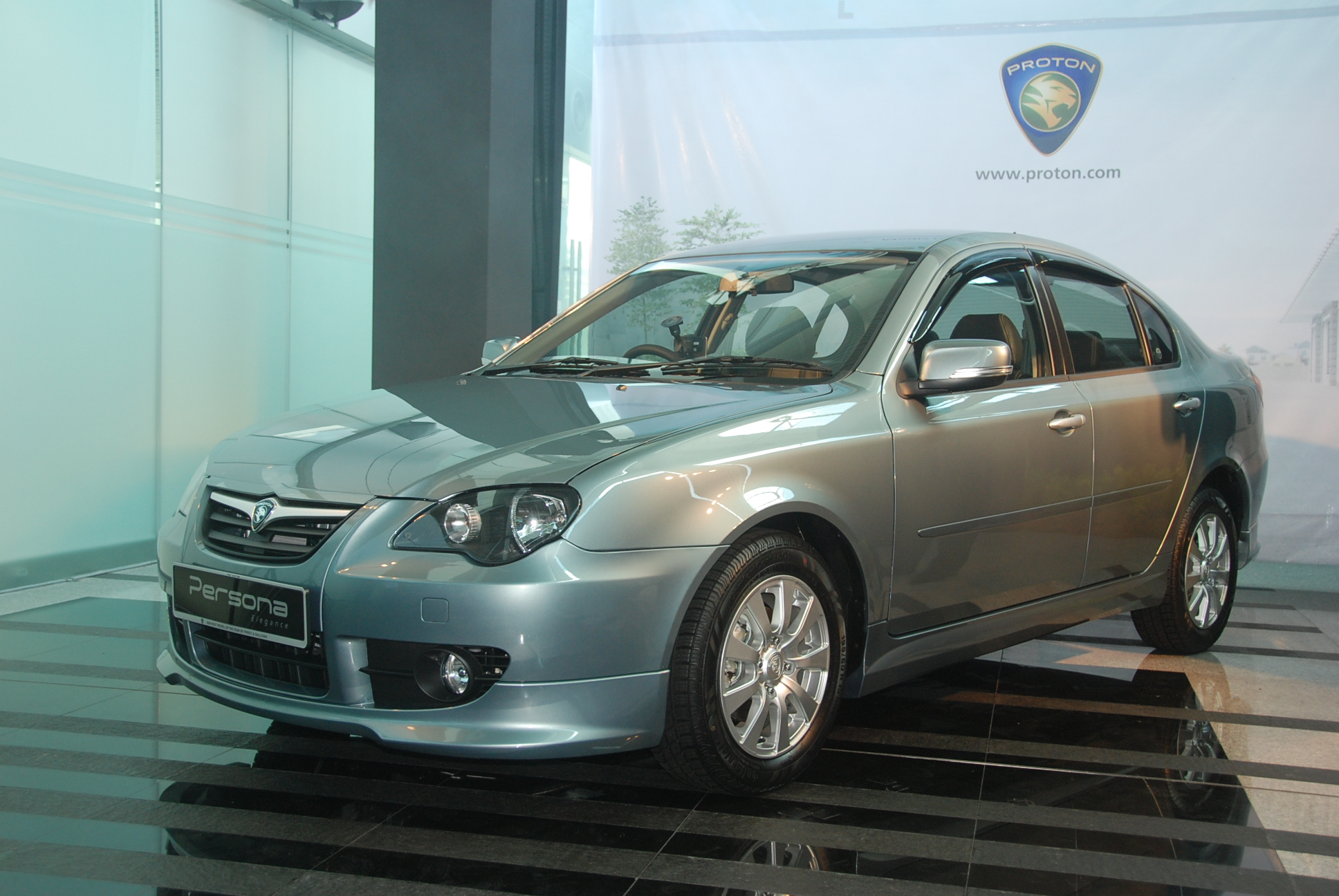
Proton Persona Elegance

The CM Persona given a facelift under the name Proton Persona Elegance on 18 March 2010. It featured a revised front grille, headlamps, front and rear bumper, bodykit, and LED tail lamps. The Campro IAFM engine's power output remains unchanged, but was upgraded with a completely new 32 bit ECU from Continental's VDO division. Five trim lines were available; Base-Line (Manual or Automatic), Medium-Line (Manual or Automatic) and High-line (Automatic) along with five colours; Brilliant Red, Genetic Silver, Tranquility Black, Bronze Garnet and Chiffon Green respectively. A sixth colour, Solid White, joined the range in May 2011.

After the launch of the Proton Prevé, the Persona lineup was reduced to a sole Standard variant which was effectively the B-Line model.

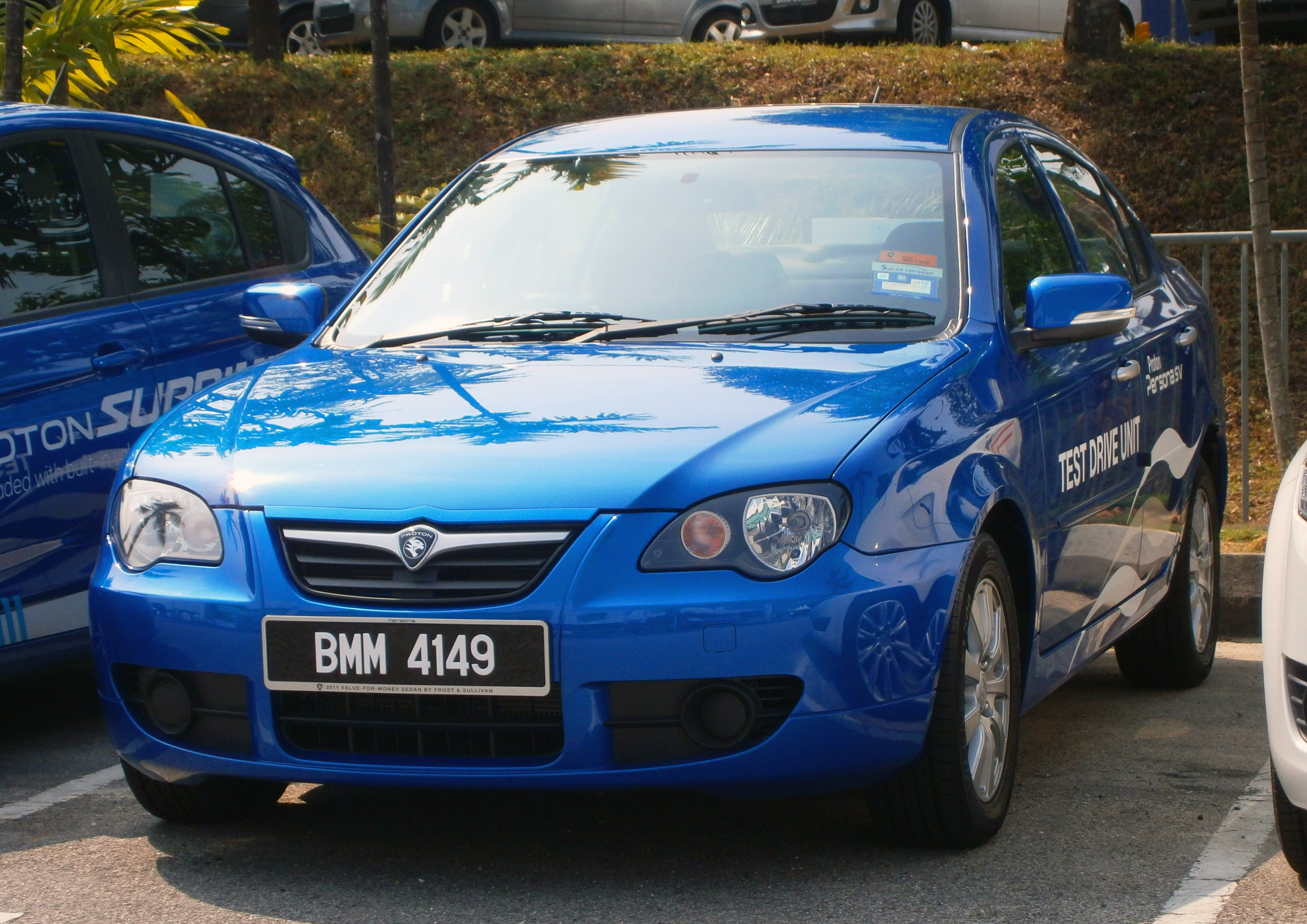
Proton Persona SV test drive car.

Proton launched the Persona SV (in which ‘SV’ is an acronym for ‘Super Value’) at the Proton Bola! Bola! Bola! Mega Test Drive Carnival on 30 November 2013. The launch comes six months after the introduction of the well-received Proton Saga SV. Like the Saga SV, some trim and equipment were removed in an effort to lower its pricing, but Proton did not compromise on safety as the Persona SV is equipped with dual front airbags, front seat belt pre-tensioners and all-round disc brakes with ABS and EBD. Such safety equipment is comparable to its main competitors, the Toyota Vios, Honda City and Nissan Almera. The Persona SV is offered as a larger and more powerful alternative to the Saga SV and is priced between RM44,938 and RM48,388. In comparison, the Saga SV retails between RM33,438 and RM36,888 respectively.

In July 2014, Proton re-launched the H-Line variant now known as the Executive variant with a different finish to the wheels.

Proton has sold 265,882 units of the CM Persona as of 31 August 2015, since its original debut on 15 August 2007.

== Design ==
=== Exterior ===
The CM Persona was largely based on the then three-year-old Proton GEN•2 hatchback platform, albeit modified to fit saloon specifications. The entire section aft of the B-pillar was re-engineered, amounting to a 167mm length extension over the GEN•2. The extended rear overhang incorporates a larger 430-litre boot, while the boot lid itself was redesigned and features space-saving twin gas strut hinges. Rear headroom in the Persona was also increased by 43mm over the GEN•2 courtesy of a redesigned rear roof design.

Pre-facelift styling

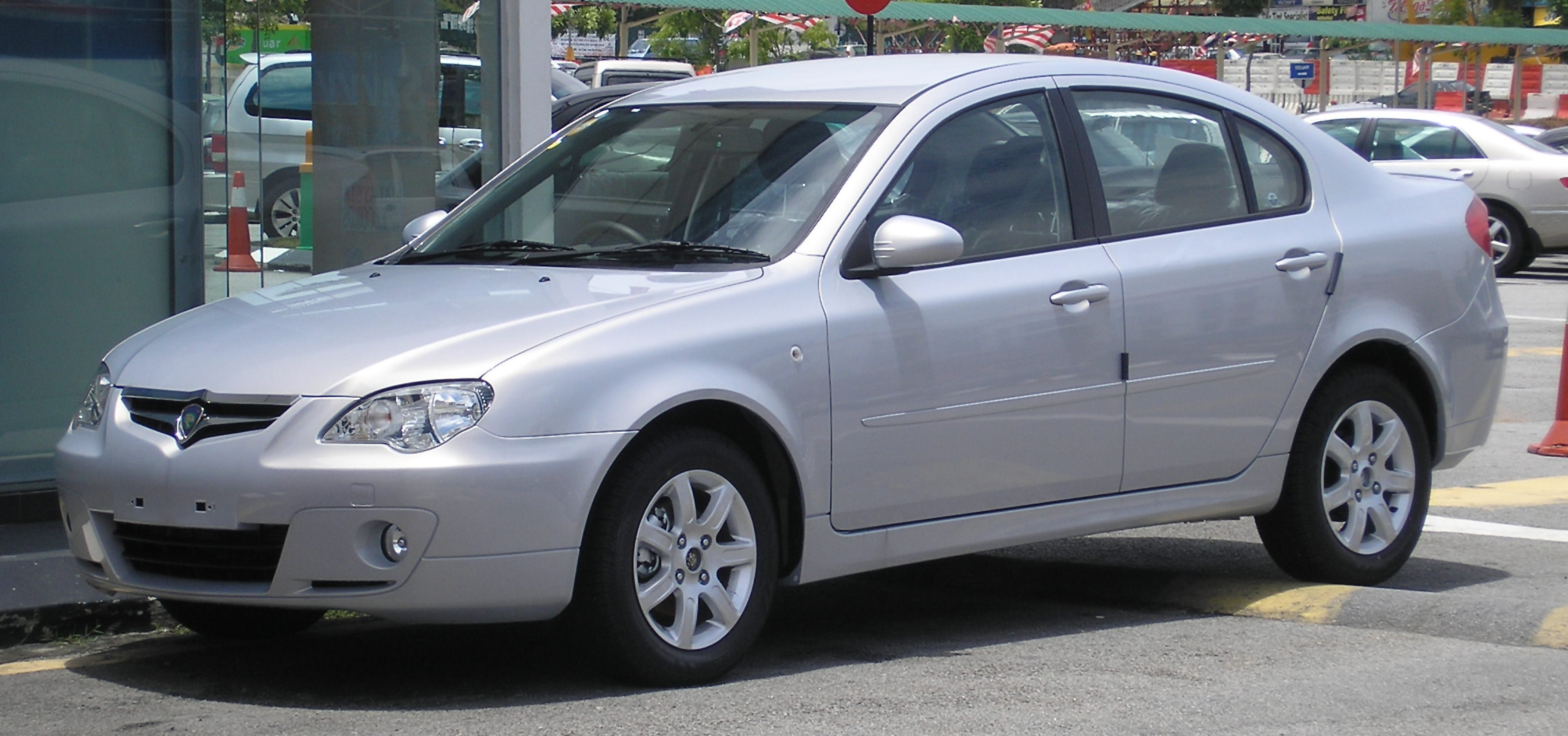
Front

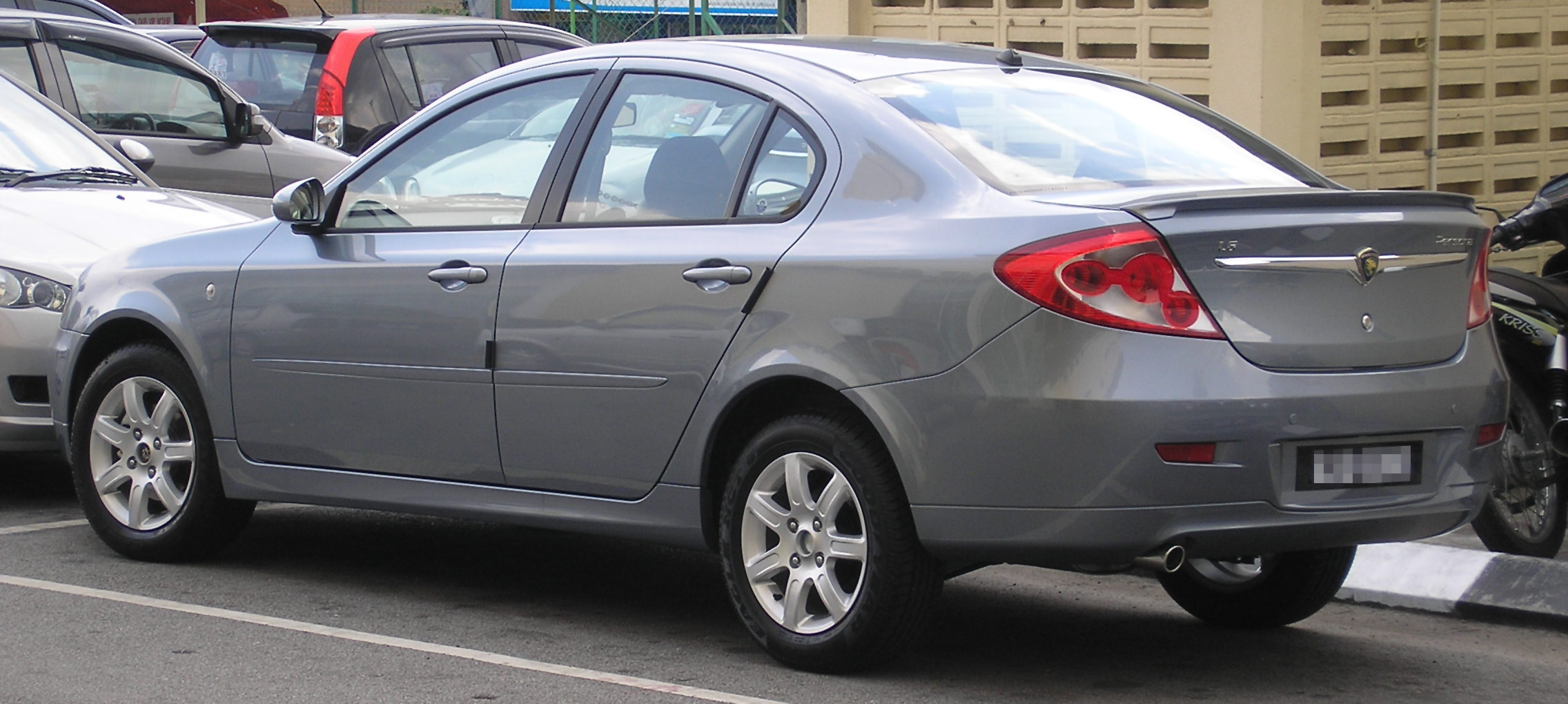
Rear

Post-facelift styling

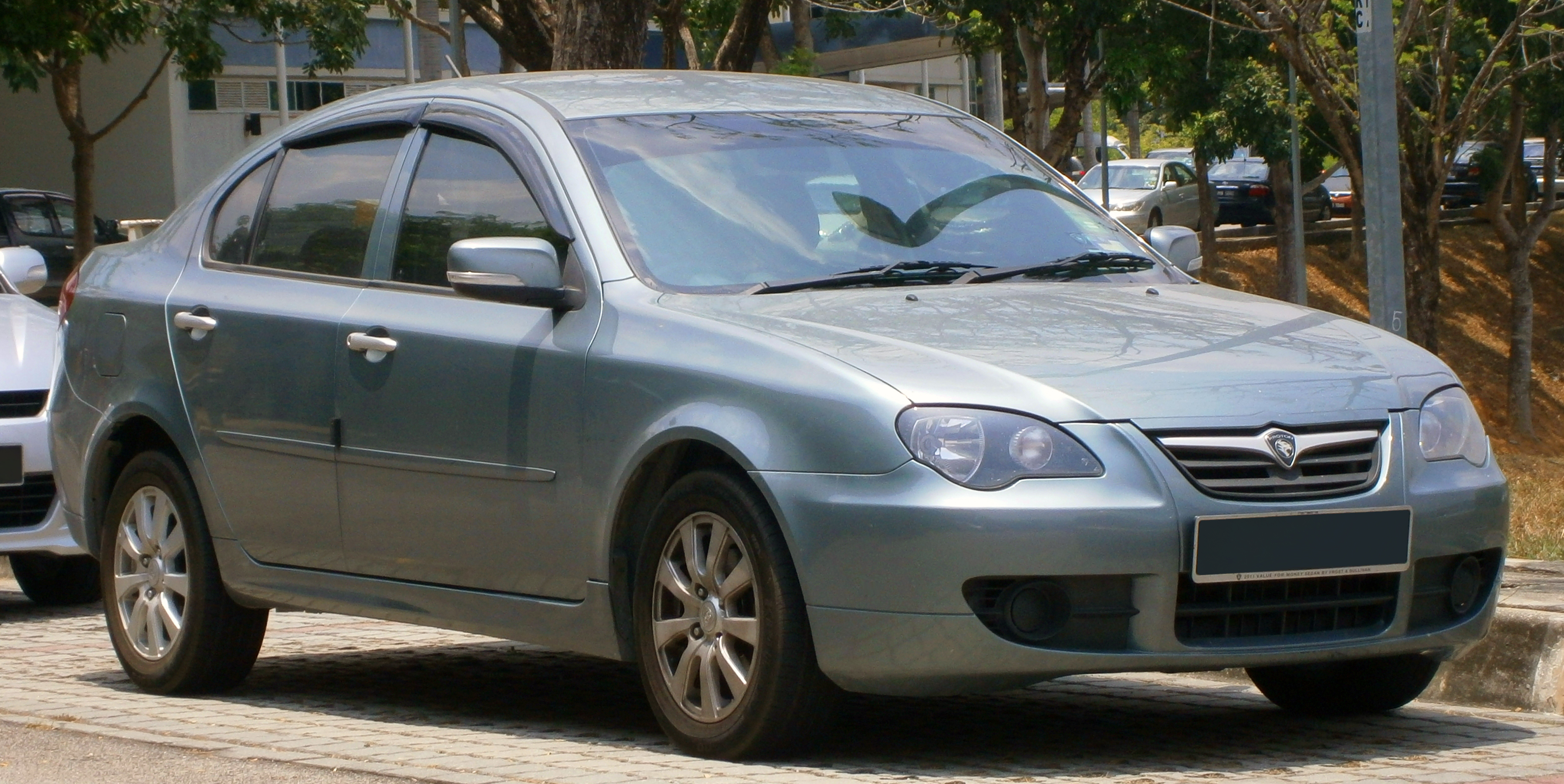
Front

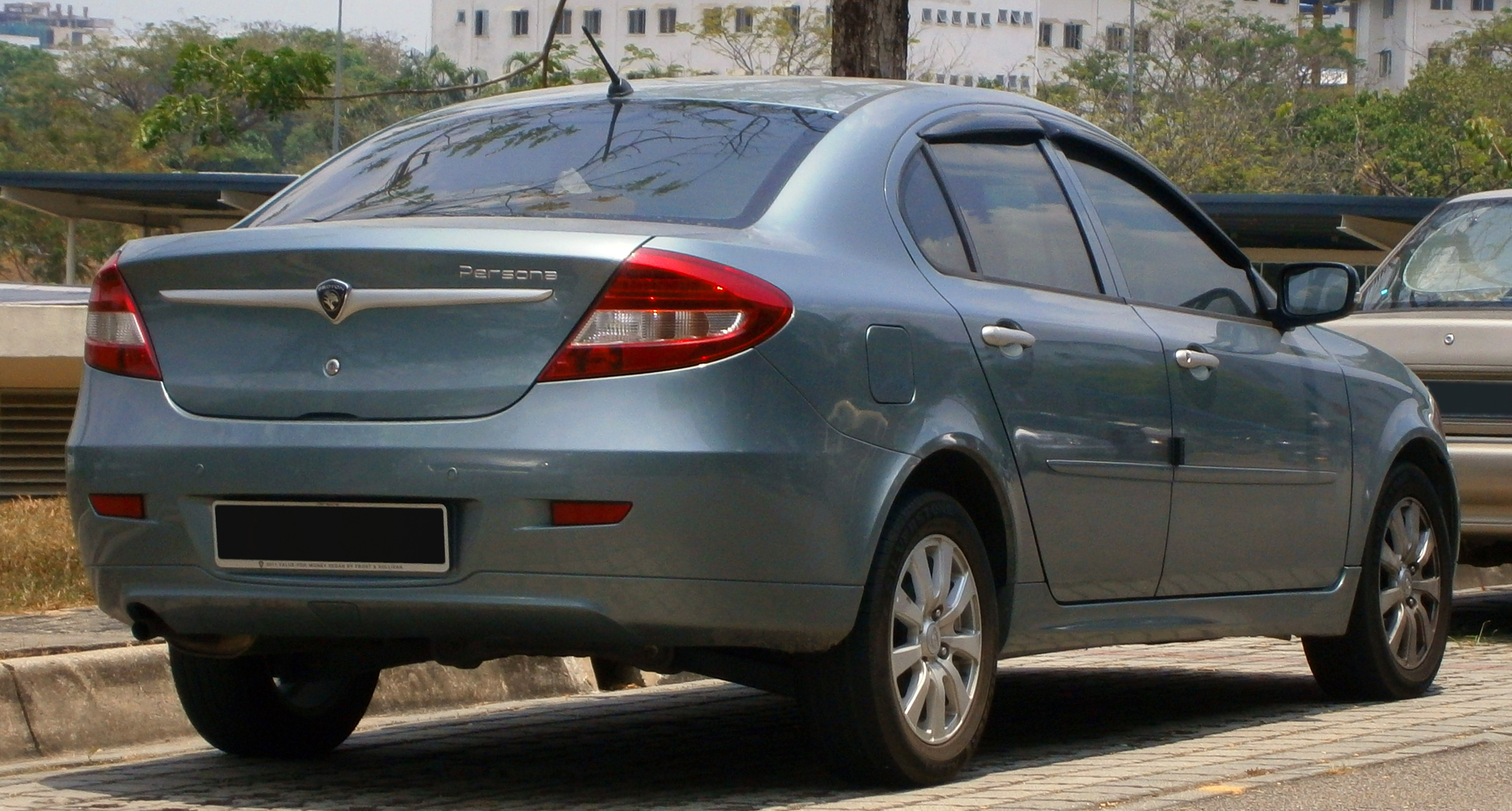
Rear

=== Interior ===
The interior was redesigned to incorporate a glovebox in the dashboard, which was noticeable by its absence in the original GEN•2. The analog clock on top of the GEN•2's dashboard has been replaced by a digital one that now resides in the digital display in the instrument panel. In addition, the door trim and panels were modified to feature power window switches (which were in the centre console in the GEN•2) and more ergonomic door handles. The pseudo-racing seats have been replaced by more conventional units with improved comfort. Fit and finish has also been improved and Proton made significant improvements to comfort and refinement, in line with this vehicle being more family orientated than the GEN•2.

A revised version of the GEN•2 launched on 3 March 2008 incorporated the interior trim upgrades introduced in the Persona.

== Powertrain ==
The 1.6-litre CamPro S4PH engine in the CM Persona is the same 82 kW (110 hp) unit used in other Proton models, but with an improved cast aluminium oil pan design that reduces potential damage risks. A transmission control unit re-calibration on models with automatic transmissions reduces the hunting of gears and improves gear changes in an attempt to mask the dip in the torque curve in the lower and middle rev ranges. In the following year, the Persona came equipped with a new variable-geometry intake manifold module (Campro IAFM engine) which improves low-end torque and high-rev breathing.

The new Proton Persona CNG Version is the Mixed Fuel From Gasoline and CNG.

The new Proton Persona addressed many of the GEN•2's flaws, but the GEN•2 remained in production and received a major facelift several months after the launch of the Persona.

Powertrain Engine & Performance
| Engine | CamPro / CamPro IAFM, 4 Cylinder, DOHC 16V |
| Maximum Speed (km/h) | 180–200 km/h (112–124 mph) |
| Acceleration 0–100 km/h (sec) | 11.5 seconds |
| Maximum Output hp(kW)/rpm | 110 hp (82 kW) / 6000rpm, (or +2 KW @ 6500rpm for IAFM) |
| Maximum Torque (Nm/rpm) | 148 N⋅m (109 lbf⋅ft) / 4,000rpm |
| Full tank capacity (Litre) | 50 |
| Tyres & Rims | 195 / 60 R15, Steel or 195 / 60 R15, 6Jx15" Alloy rims |
Chassis
| Power Steering | Hydraulic Power Steering |
| Suspension (Front/Rear) | MacPherson Strut with anti-roll bar/Multilink with Stabiliser Bar |
| Brake (Front/Rear) | Ventilated discs/rear drums or ventilated discs/ solid discs |

== Export market ==
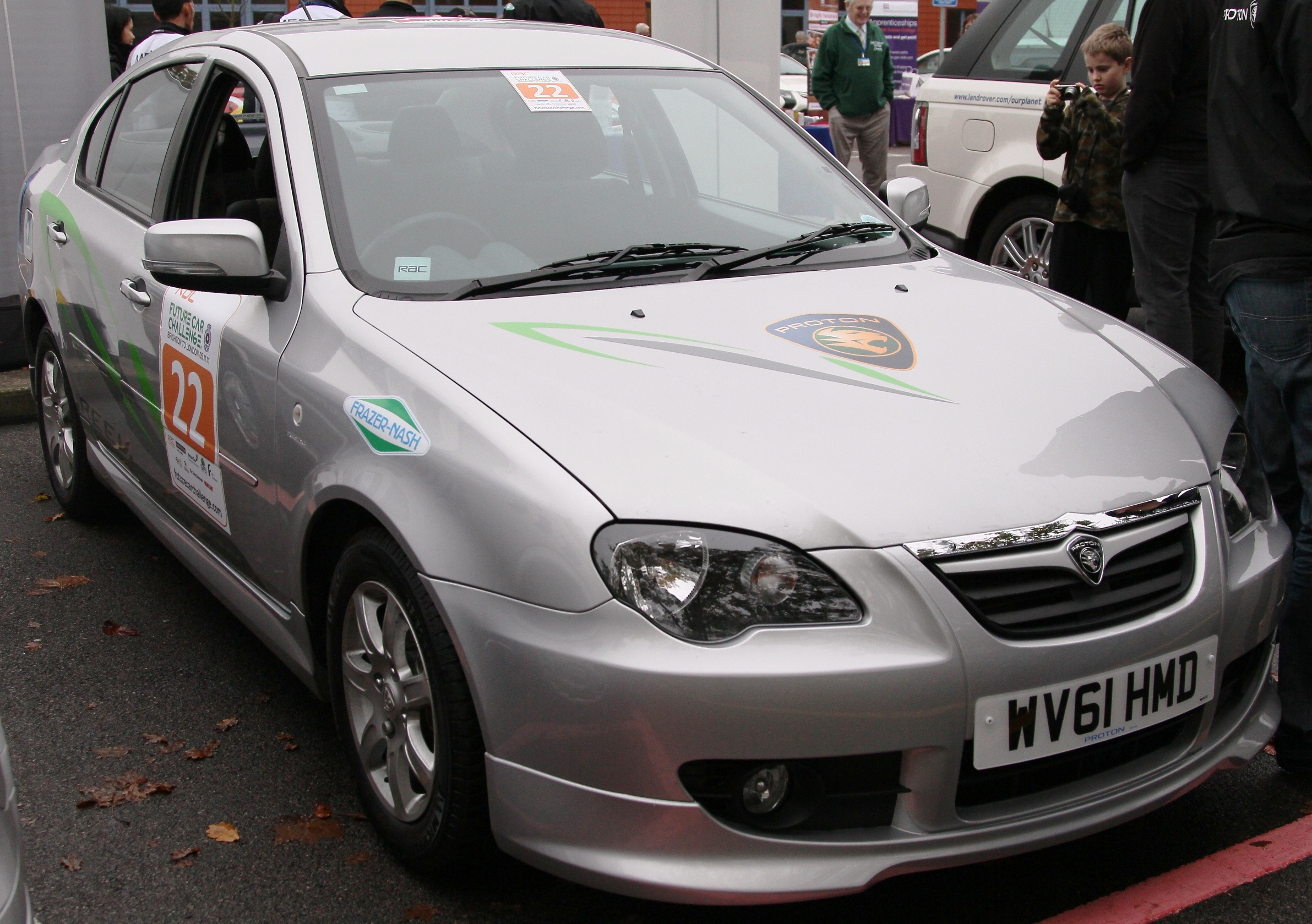
The Proton Persona REEV during the RAC Future Car Challenge 2011, U.K.

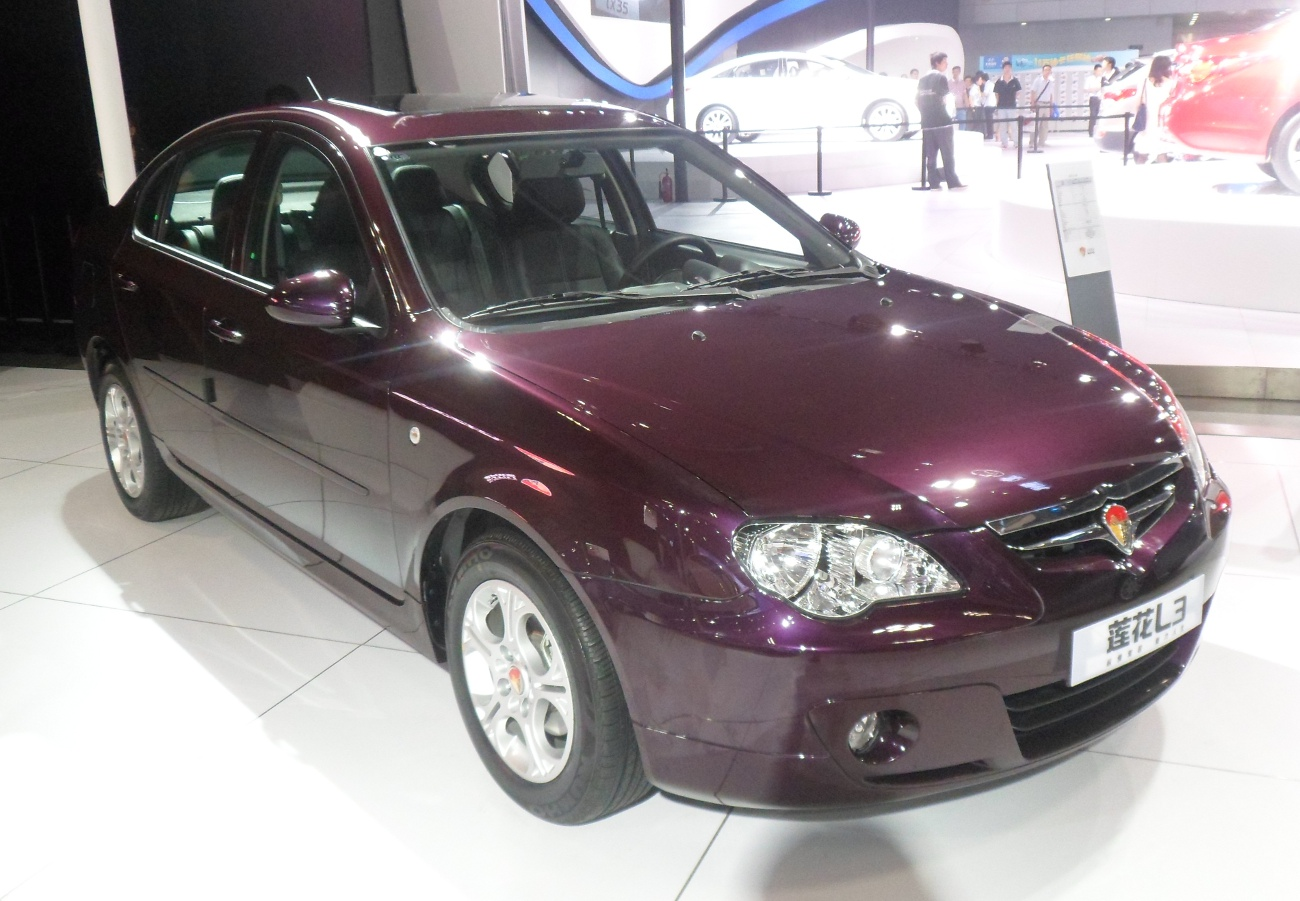
Youngman Lotus L3 (Mainland China)

On 10 March 2008, Proton Cars UK announced the new addition of the Proton Persona saloon to the British market, which is known as the Proton GEN•2 Persona, while the Personas sold in other countries (such as Singapore and Australia) retain the name Persona. Besides the United Kingdom, Proton also uses the GEN•2 Persona name for the Indonesian market, and had also been launched in Saudi Arabia on 22 November 2008 and in Egypt on 24 November; the GEN•2 model was also jointly launched in Egypt.

While officially marketed in the UK, Society of Motor Manufacturers and Traders sales figures for 2008 revealed only 4 units of the GEN•2 Persona were sold in that year, ranking the car as one of the least sold car models in the country in 2008.

Proton participated in the RAC Future Car Challenge on 6 November 2011 with plug-in electric versions of the Persona, Saga and Exora, in which the company claimed 2 awards despite their shortcomings.

The Persona was rebadged and manufactured by the Chinese car manufacturer Europestar as the Youngman Lotus L3 in China. Production ran from 2009 to 2013. A 1.5 and 1.6 litre engine were available paired with a 5 speed manual and 4 speed automatic gearbox.

On 12 July 2018, 13 units of Proton Persona CM were exported to Middle East countries, together with 440 units of Proton Gen2.

== Reception ==
=== Awards ===
- 2011 Best Practices Award – Value-for-Money Car of the Year (1.31 and Above) Malaysia Excellence Awards – Frost & Sullivan
- 2008 Asian Auto – Bosch Fuel Efficiency Awards – 1st place Family Car category (reported average fuel consumption of 6.8 L/100 km (42 mpg-imp; 35 mpg-US).[12] )
- 2008 Frost & Sullivan Best Model of the Year.

Proton GEN•2/Persona (CM) sales & production between 2004 and Q2 2016
| Country | Model | Total | Q2 2016 | Q1 2016 | 2015 | 2014 | 2013 | 2012 | 2011 | 2010 | 2009 | 2008 | 2007 | 2006 | 2005 | 2004 |
|---|---|---|---|---|---|---|---|---|---|---|---|---|---|---|---|---|
| Malaysia | GEN•2 | | | | | | | | 664 | 1,632 | 2,055 | 4,143 | 10,719 | 18,925 | 32,927 | 20,066 |
| Malaysia | Persona | | 946 | 1,044 | 11,143 | N/A | | | 46,415 | 44,391 | 42,988 | 42,310 | 18,333 | | | |
| Australia | GEN•2 | | | | | 49 | 64 | 188 | 328 | 190 | 186 | 308 | 506 | 609 | 878 | 174 |
| Australia | Persona | | | | | 67 | 92 | 241 | 173 | 250 | 351 | 339 | | | | |
| United Kingdom | Both | | | | | | | N/A | | | 503 | 844 | 997 | 1,177 | 1,256 | 246 |
| Thailand | GEN•2 | 1,186 | | | | 1 | 0 | 37 | 98 | 195 | 271 | 584 | | | | |
| Thailand | Persona | 5,321 | | | | | 26 | 994 | 1,588 | 1,326 | 978 | 409 | | | | |
| Turkey | Both | | | | 500 | 707 | 715 | 682 | N/A | 856 | 748 | 862 | 552 | | | |
| Egypt | GEN•2 | | | | 390 | 753 | 593 | 496 | 290 | N/A | | | | | | |
| Egypt | Persona | | | | 376 | 539 | 456 | 431 | 142 | 1,418 | N/A | | | | | |
| Iran | GEN•2 | | | | | | | | 2 | 2,375 | 1,400 | 925 | | | | |
| United Arab Emirates | Both | | | | | | 14 | 260 | 346 | | | | | | | |
| Saudi Arabia | GEN•2 | | | | | | 16 | | | | | | | | | |
| Saudi Arabia | Persona | | | | | 5 | 119 | | | | | | | | | |
| South Africa | GEN•2 | | | | | | 37 | 55 | 60 | | | | | | | |
| South Africa | Persona | | | | 2 | 30 | 61 | 77 | 48 | | | | | | | |
| Indonesia | GEN•2 | | | | | | 18 | 248 | 382 | 451 | | | | | | |
| Indonesia | Persona | | | | | 2 | 22 | | | | | | | | | |
| New Zealand | GEN•2 | | | | | | | | | | 8 | 0 | 1 | | | |
| New Zealand | Persona | | | | | | | | | | 9 | | | | | |
| Total global sales | GEN•2 | N/A | | | | | | | | | | | | | | |
| Total global sales | Persona | N/A | | | | | | | | | | | | | | |
| Total produced | GEN•2 | | 0 | 102 | 511 | 245 | 1,489 | 1,148 | 981 | 4,248 | 3,051 | N/A | | | | |
| Total produced | Persona | | | 1,615 | 6,609 | 23,352 | 17,032 | 28,831 | 47,370 | 49,884 | 44,071 | N/A | | | | |
Notes: Q1 2016 applies for the months of January, February & March 2016 respectively. Q2 2016 applies for the months of April, May & June 2016 respectively. Total applies for units sold in the specified country between sales inception and June 2016 respectively. Total global sales applies for combined units sold in all active markets. Total produced applies for all units produced between January 2009 and June 2016 respectively.
