= Youngman =

Chinese manufacturer of buses and trucks

China Youngman Automobile Group Co., Ltd.

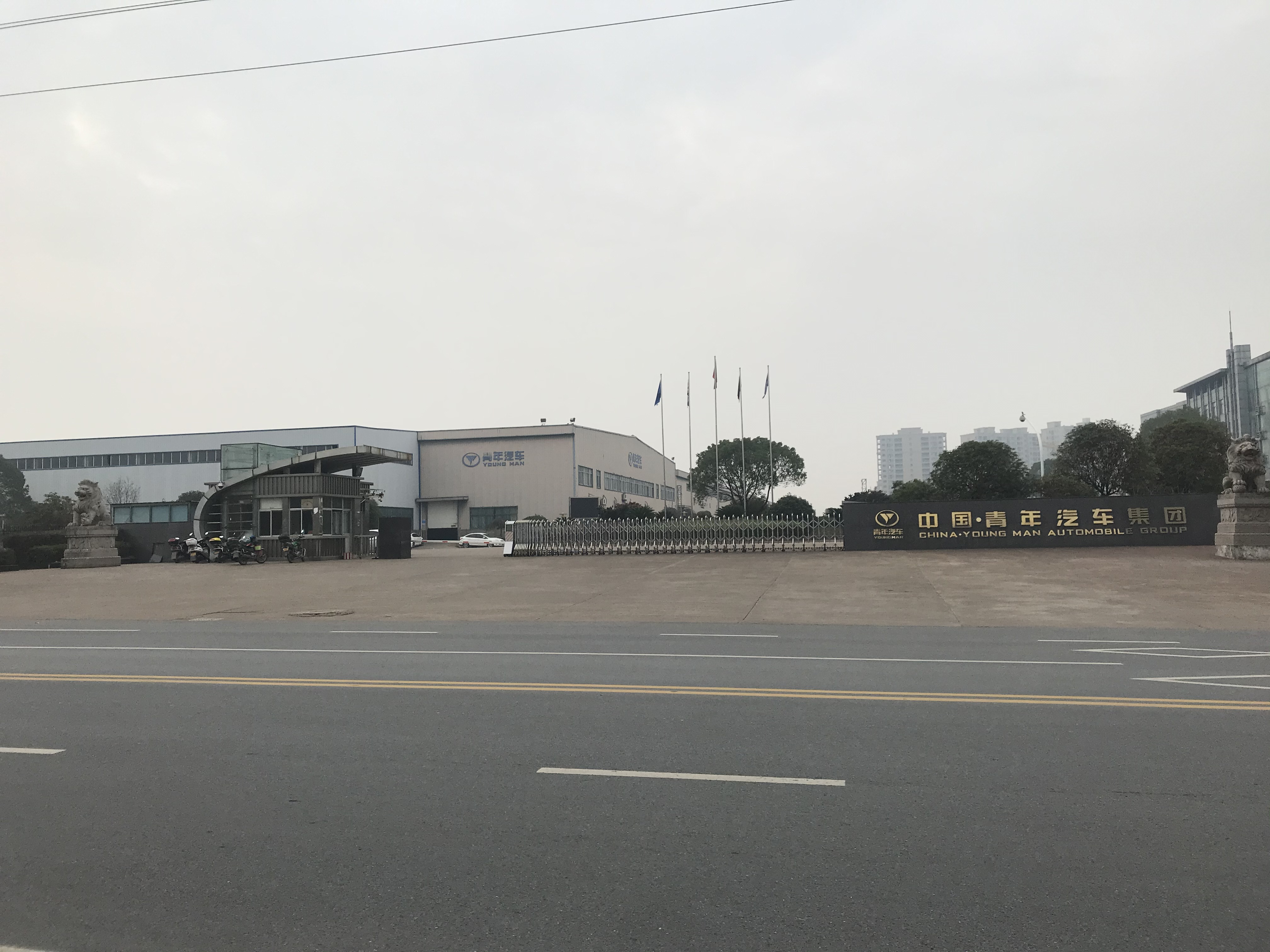
- Company Headquarter in Jinhua
- Industry: Automotive
- Founded: 2001; 25 years ago
- Founder: Pang Qingnian
- Defunct: 19 November 2019; 6 years ago
- Headquarters: Jinhua, Zhejiang, China
- Products: Automobiles, buses and trucks
- Number of employees: Approx 4,000
- Website: Youngman

Youngman (officially China Youngman Automobile Group Co., Ltd.) (Chinese: 青年汽车集团) was a Chinese manufacturer of buses and trucks located in Jinhua, Zhejiang province. The company was founded in 2001 by Pang Qingnian and also used to manufacture automobiles. However, its passenger car business appears to have ceased operation by mid-2015.

== Name ==
"Youngman" is an English literalization of the name of the company's founder, Pang Qingnian.

== History ==
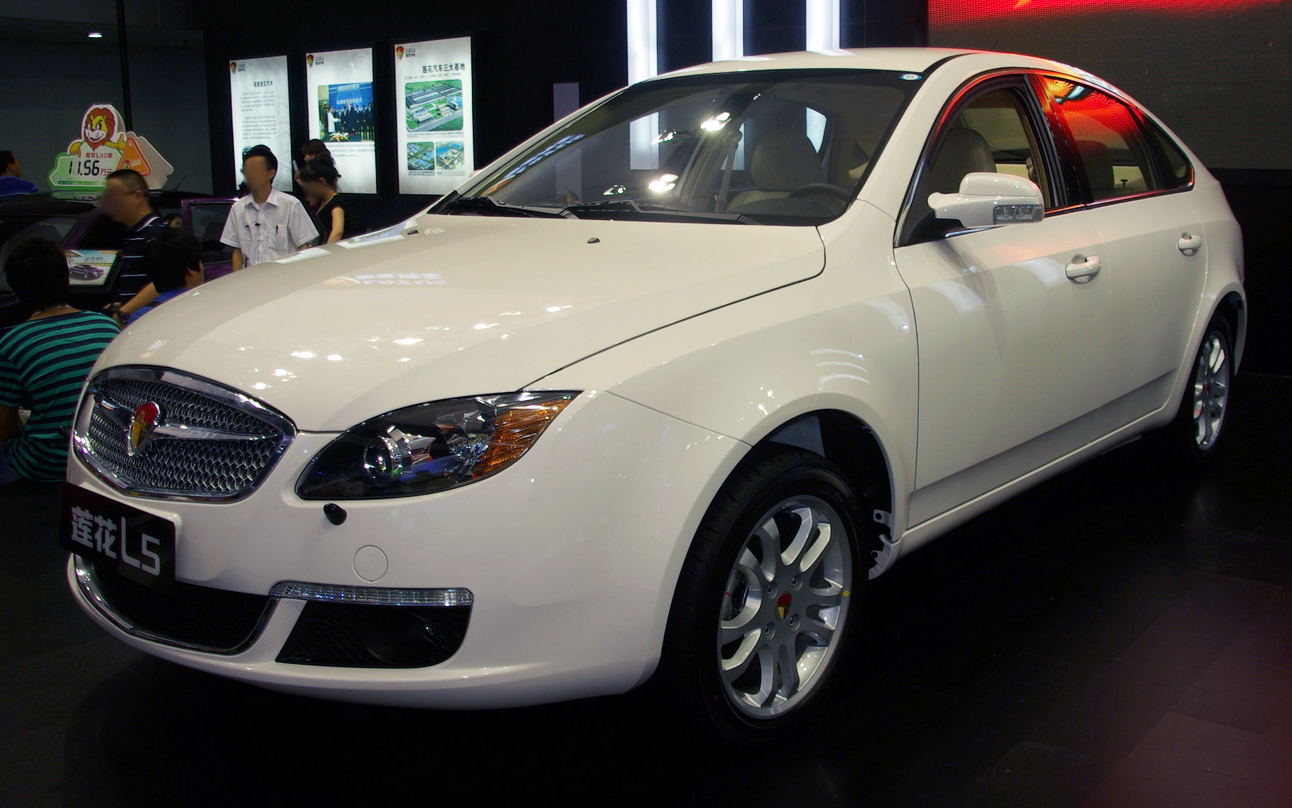
A 2011 Youngman Lotus L5.

Youngman was founded in 2001 by Pang Qingnian. In the early-2000s the company formed joint ventures with two German companies - a bus manufacturing venture with Neoplan (at the time known as Gottlob Auwärter GmbH & Co. KG) and a truck manufacturing venture with MAN. After an increase of orders, the manufacturer has built plants in the cities of Jinan, Tai'an, Lianyungang, Quzhou and some other places to meet the high number of orders.

In September 2006, Youngman established a joint venture with the Iranian state-owned carmaker Iran Khodro for the manufacture of Iran Khodro's Samand and Soren models at Youngman's Tai'an plant, with parts supplied by PSA Peugeot Citroën.

In September 2016, Shanghai Buses filed a formal complaint regarding 245 YoungMan JNP6120BEV trolleybuses being delivered with installed battery capacity less than the declared capacity.

In October 2019, Youngman formally completed the bankruptcy process, with eight people in the group also being prosecuted for related crimes.

=== Proton ===
In November 2006, Youngman became the official Chinese importer for the British sports car maker Lotus Cars. In another joint-venture with the Lotus Group which was closed in December 2008, Youngman assembled Lotus and Europestar branded cars in Guangdong for the Domestic Chinese and export market. The units receive a Chinese independent brand to differentiate itself from the British sports car models. With the Lotus joint venture, Youngman is engaged in secondary activities as the exclusive importer of American automotive brand ZAP. Both brands had its China debut at the Beijing International Auto Show in 2009. In 2007, Youngman acquired the American electric car maker Detroit Electric (company), with the intention of manufacturing vehicles for the North American market.

In May 2008, it was reported that Youngman had signed two major agreements with the Malaysian carmaker Proton. The first was for the import of 30,000 Proton Gen-2 models from Malaysia to China over two years, to be sold under the Europestar marque as the RCR. The second was a licensing deal for Proton's Lotus-designed Campro engine, whereby Proton would sell 150,000 complete knock down units to Youngman over the subsequent six years.

In June 2010, Youngman had announced that it would be making an investment of CNY 4 billion in the construction of new manufacturing facilities in Haining, Zhejiang Province, for the production of passenger cars, alternative energy powertrain systems, vehicle bridges, transmissions and inner and exterior auto components. It is unclear what has happened to this manufacturing site since Youngman exited the passenger automobile business.

The Proton-Youngman joint venture contract expired in 2012, but Youngman continued to unofficially produce Proton's products up until early 2015. Between mid-2009 and February 2015, Youngman Lotus had reported total production figures of 196,234 rebadged CKD GEN-2 and Persona units, of which 189,872 were reportedly sold. (Note: Does not include sales of rebadged CBU GEN-2/Persona units, or Youngman Lotus' indigenously designed models.) However, by mid-2015, the China Passenger Car Association (CPCA) stopped reporting Youngman Lotus sales numbers because they were "way off" from registration numbers. Youngman Lotus had ceased production and sales altogether by mid-2015. In February 2015, Proton announced that they would revive their joint venture with Fujian-based Goldstar, and would not renew their contract with Youngman.

=== Saab ===
On 28 October 2011, it was reported that Youngman and the Chinese automotive retailer Pang Da Automobile Trade Co had agreed a joint 100-million euro (US$140 million) takeover of the Swedish carmaker Saab Automobile and its United Kingdom dealer network unit from Swedish Automobile, with Youngman and Pang Da taking 60 and 40 percent stakes respectively.

Both Chinese companies pledged to invest 610 million euros ($844 million), prompting a court to extend the manufacturer's protection against creditors.

In December 2011, General Motors (GM) blocked the Chinese buy out, since GM has technology licenses in SAAB.

Saab's restructuring process was granted, and the plan was that in 2014 the company would have had a positive equity. The restructuring process would have removed 500 employees from Saab, saving about €100,000.00, according to the restructuring plan. General Motors rejected the deal with Youngman and Pang Da on 7 November 2011, although unsuccessful discussion to convince GM continued for a month. On 19 December 2011, chairman Victor Muller was forced to file Saab Automobile for bankruptcy following the failed buyout by a Chinese consortium, which was blocked by former parent GM to prevent technology transfer.

On 6 March 2012, The Times of India reported that at least two companies have placed bids for complete SAAB Automobile buy out. These are India's Mahindra and Mahindra and China's Youngman. It is reported that these bids are in the range $300 million to $400 million.

On 13 June 2012, it was announced that the National Electric Vehicle Sweden had bought Saab Automobile's bankruptcy estate.

=== Spyker joint ventures ===
In August 2012, Youngman agreed to acquire 29.9% of the Dutch luxury sportscar maker Spyker N.V. for €6.7 million, and the companies agreed to form two new joint ventures. The Spyker P2P joint venture will focus on the development of a new luxury sports utility vehicle, with ownership split 75:25 between Youngman and Spyker respectively. The Spyker Phoenix joint venture will focus on the development of a range of premium cars based on Saab's Phoenix platform, with ownership split 80:20 between Youngman and Spyker respectively.

== Products ==
=== Passenger cars ===
Youngman sold passenger cars in China under the Youngman-Lotus marque. Products included the L3 and L5 models, and are engineered with the assistance of the United Kingdom-based Lotus Engineering.

Products are listed as below:

- Youngman Lotus L3 Hatch
- Youngman Lotus L3 GT Hatch
- Youngman Lotus L3 Sedan
- Youngman Lotus L5 Sportback
- Youngman Lotus L5 Sedan
- Youngman Lotus T5
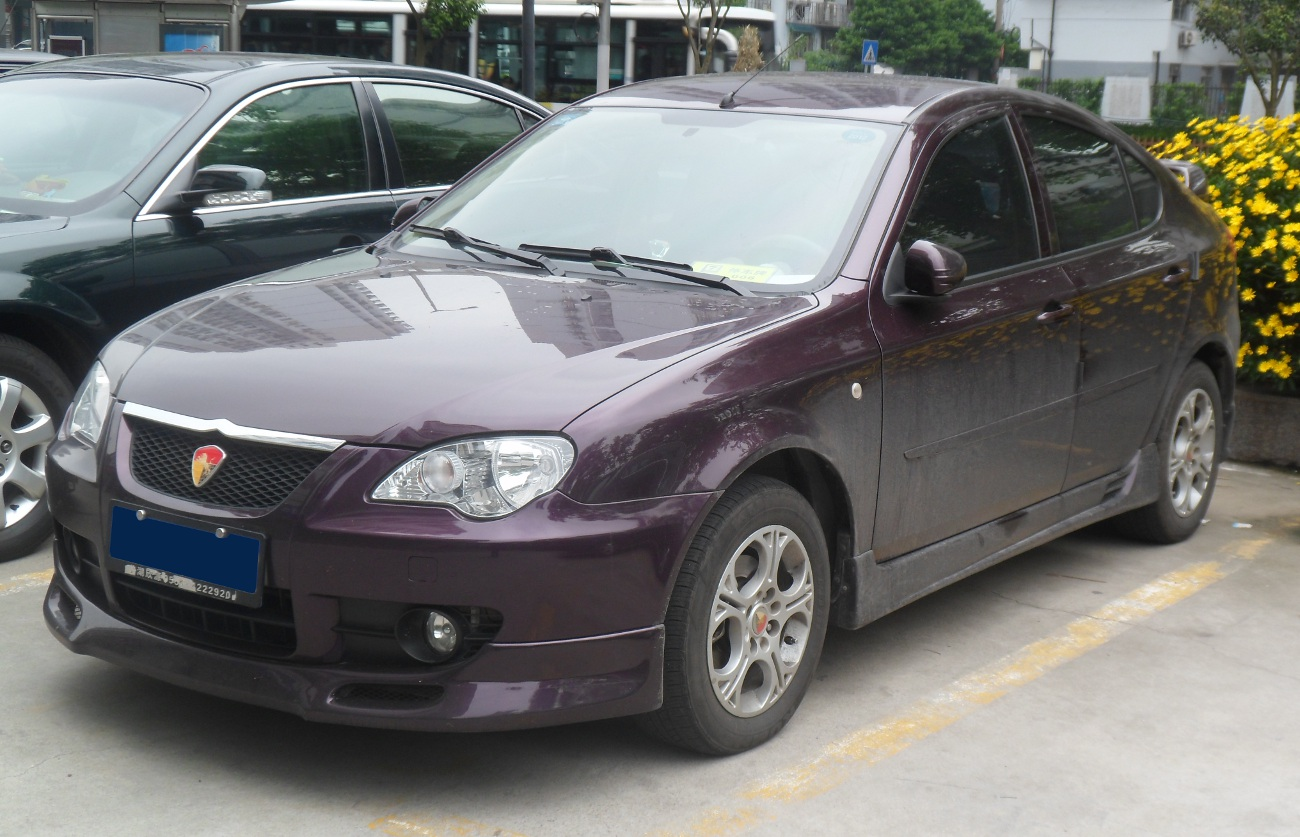
Youngman Lotus L3 Hatch

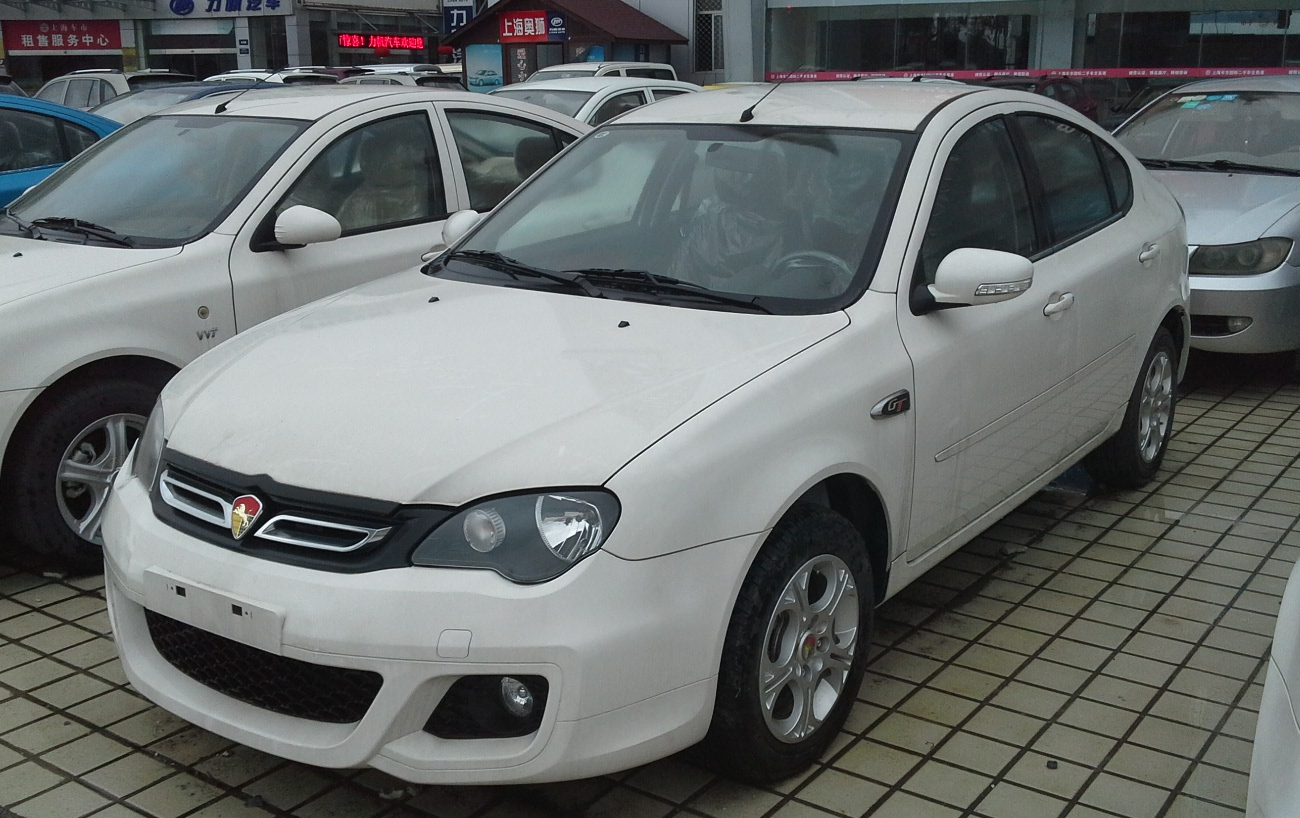
Youngman Lotus L3 GT Hatch

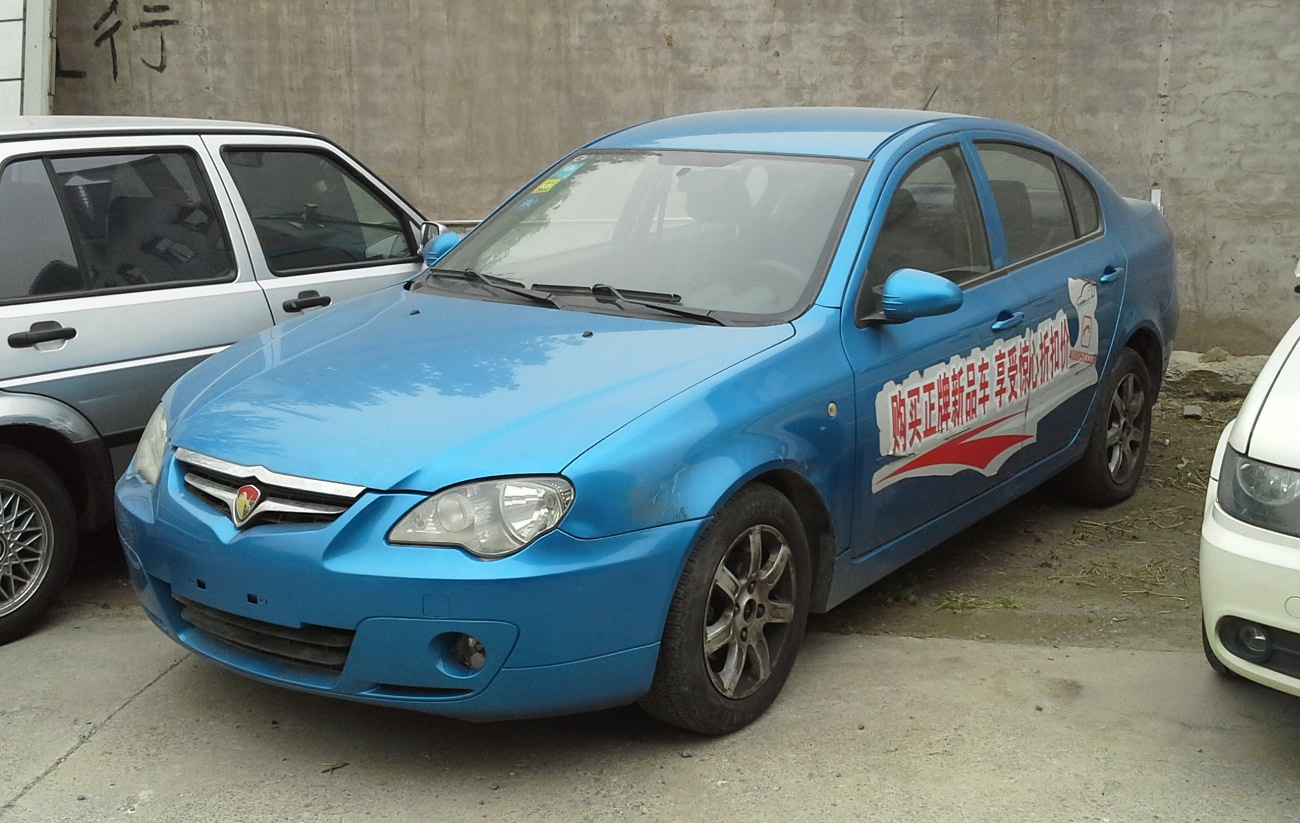
Youngman Lotus L3 Sedan

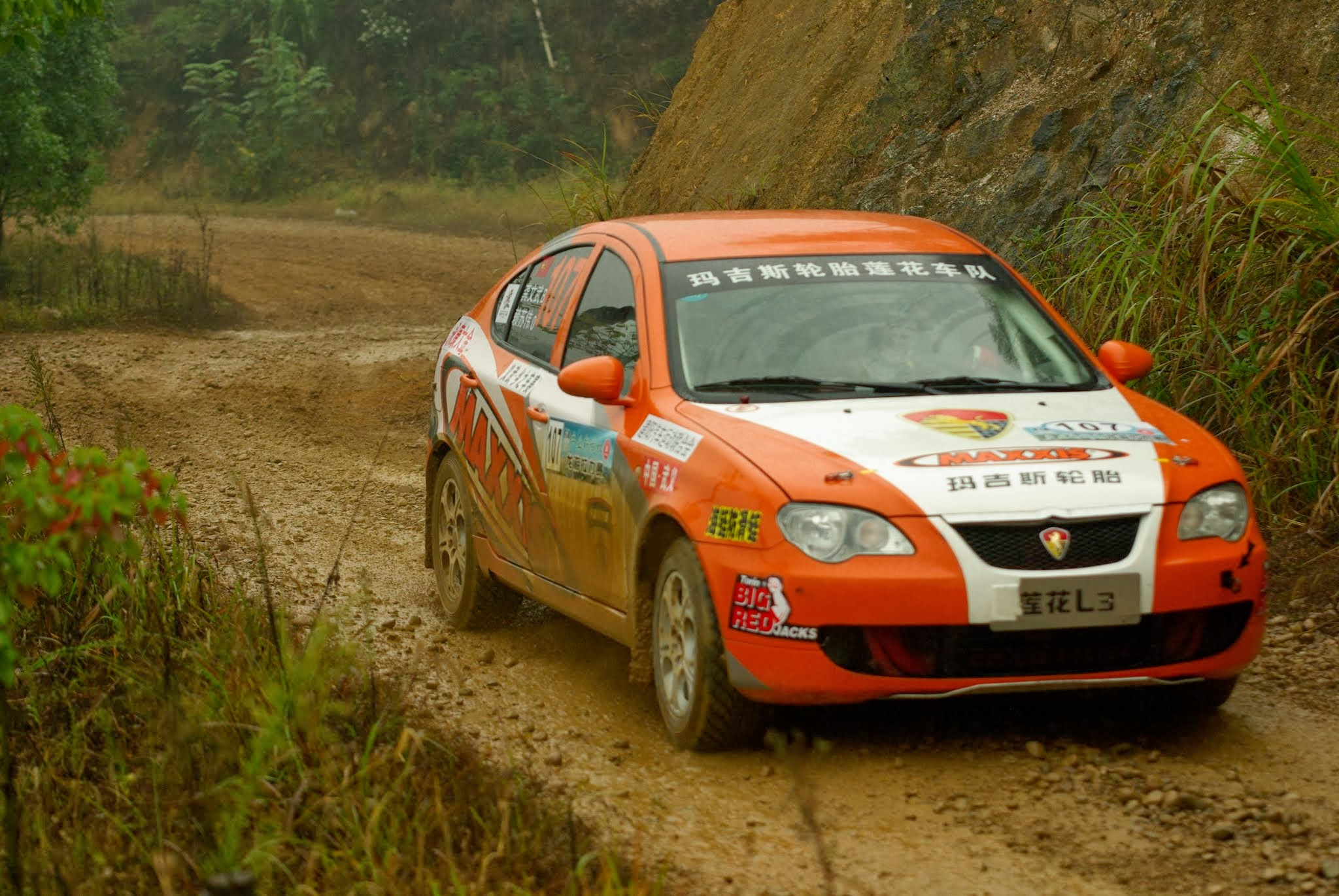
Youngman Lotus L3 Rally Car 2014

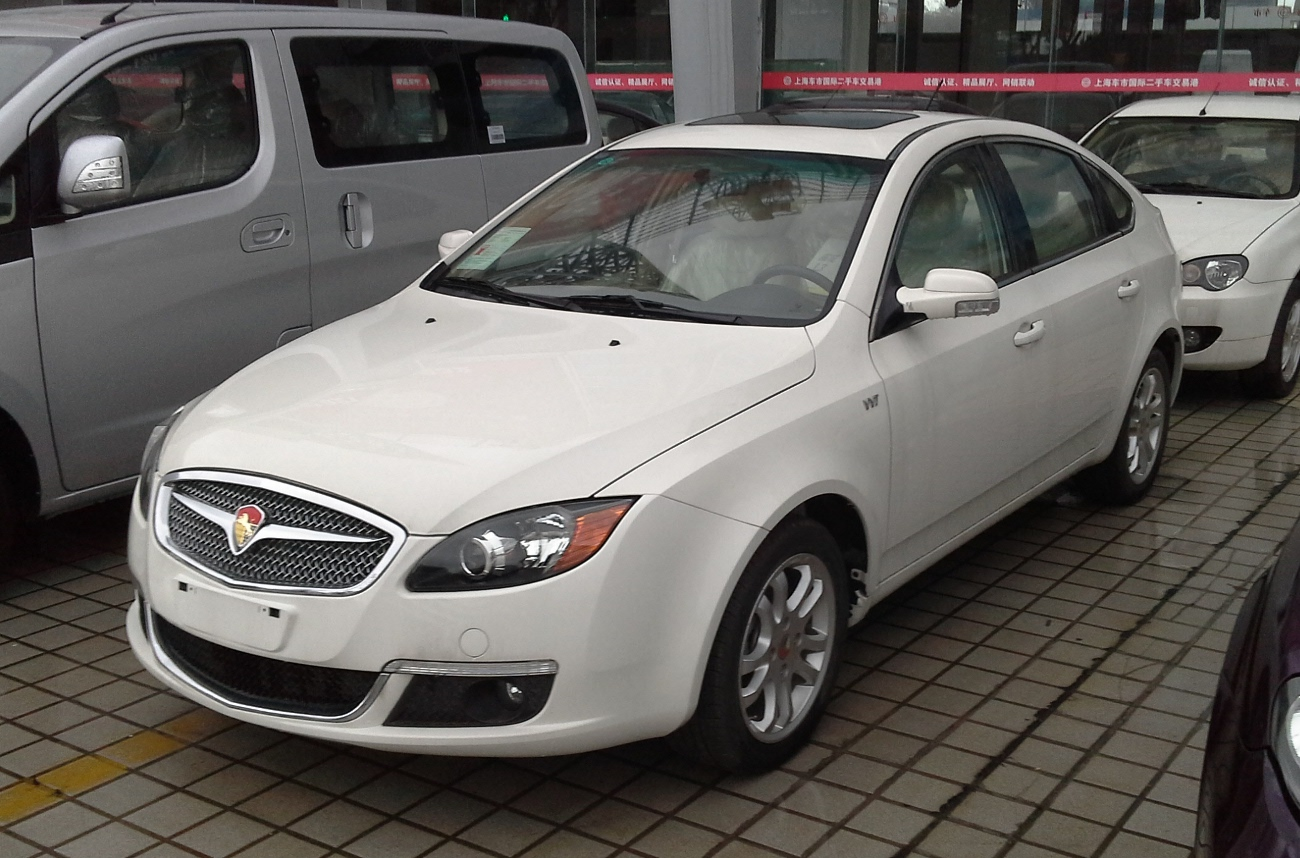
Youngman Lotus L5 Sportback

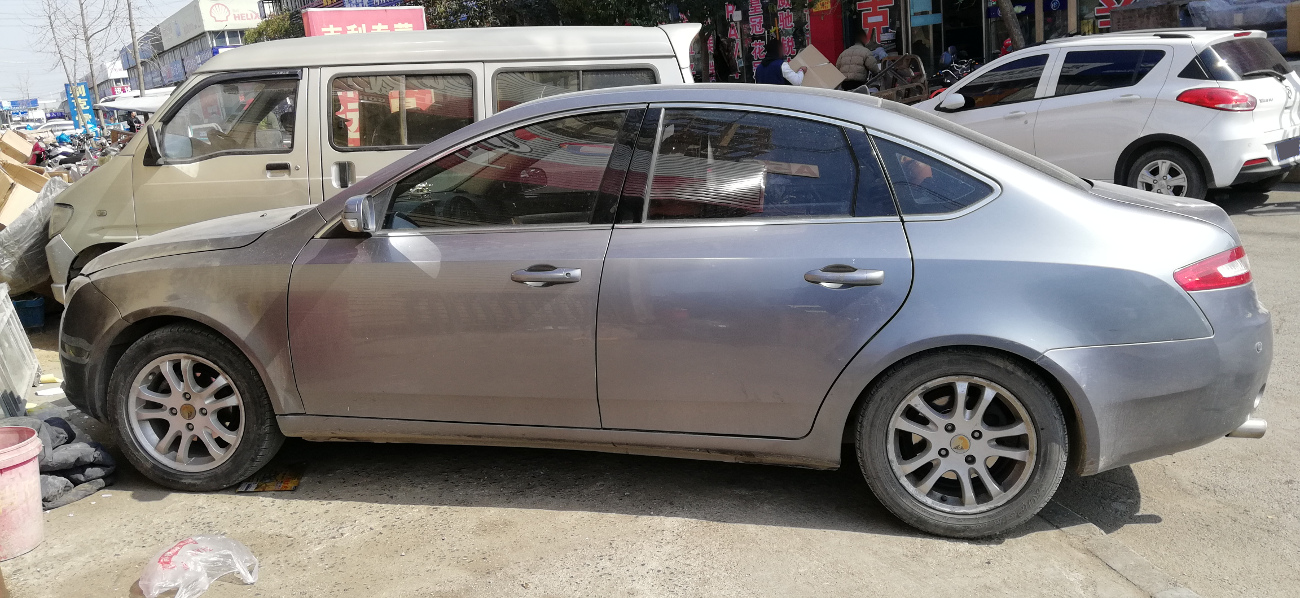
Youngman Lotus L5 Sedan

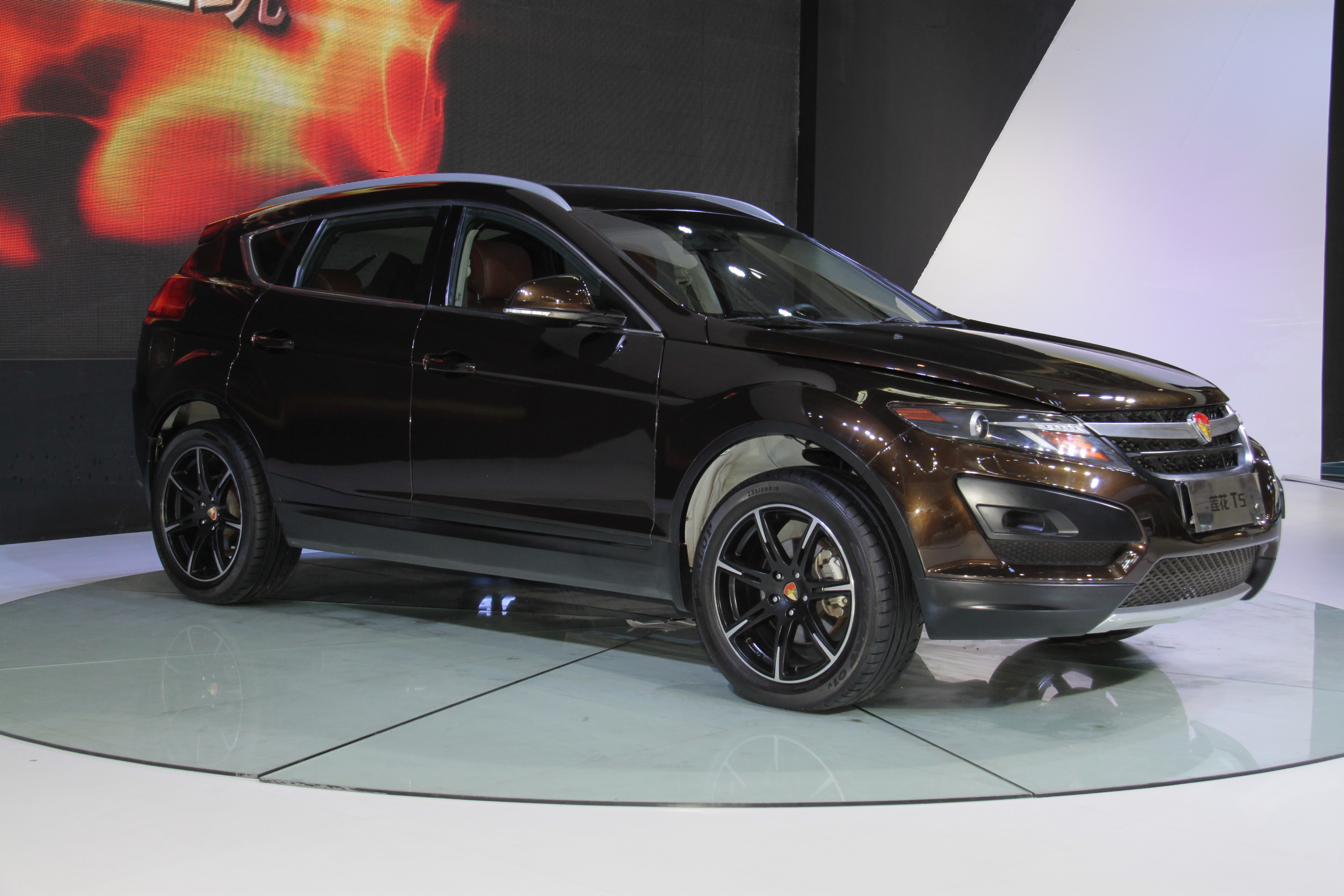
Youngman Lotus T5

=== Coaches and trucks ===
Youngman produced coaches and trucks in collaboration with the German MAN Truck & Bus. Coaches are sold under the Youngman and Neoplan marques. Trucks are sold under the Youngman and MAN marques.

- JNP6120GR, JNP6120BEV1 and JNP6105GR - single deck buses based on Neoplan Centroliner platform
- JNP6120BEV1 - trolley buses based on Neoplan Centroliner
- JNP6250G - multi-articulate bus based on Neoplan Twinliner
- JNP6180GM - single articulate bus based on Neoplan Twinliner
- JNP6137S - double decker bus based on Neoplan Skyliner
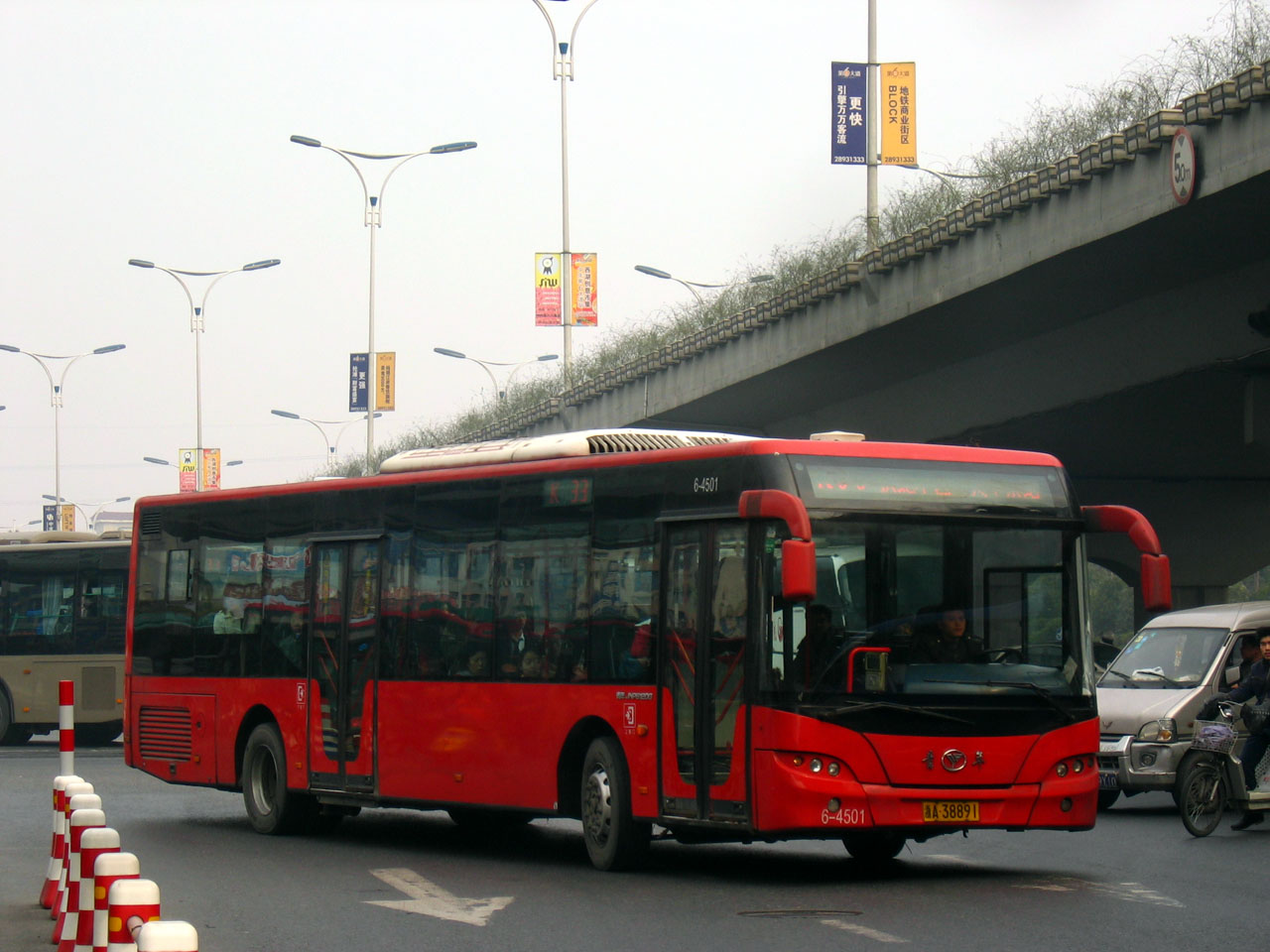
A Youngman-Neoplan JNP6120G bus in Hangzhou

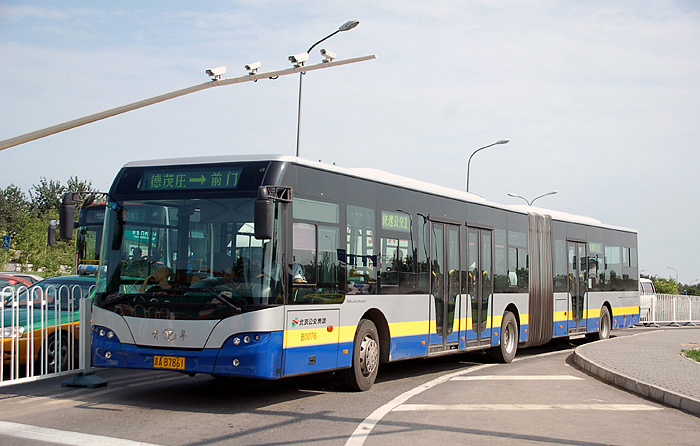
A Youngman-Neoplan JNP6180G bus in Beijing

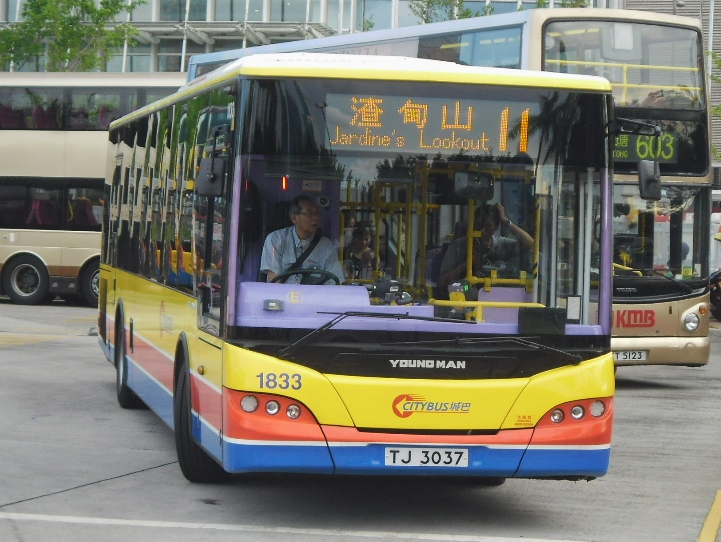
A Youngman-Neoplan JNP6120GR bus in Hong Kong

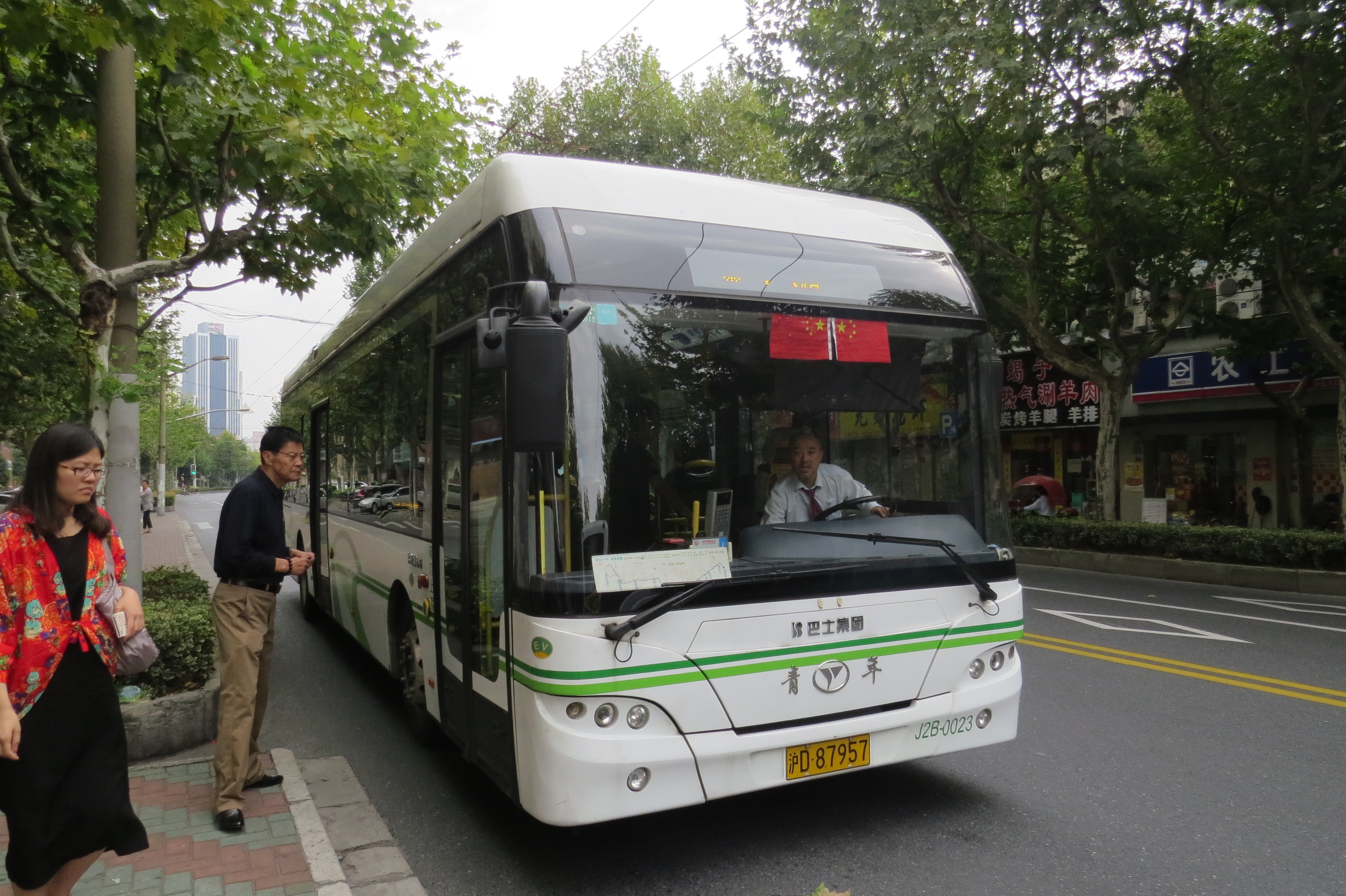
A Youngman-Neoplan JNP6120BEV1 trolleybus in Shanghai

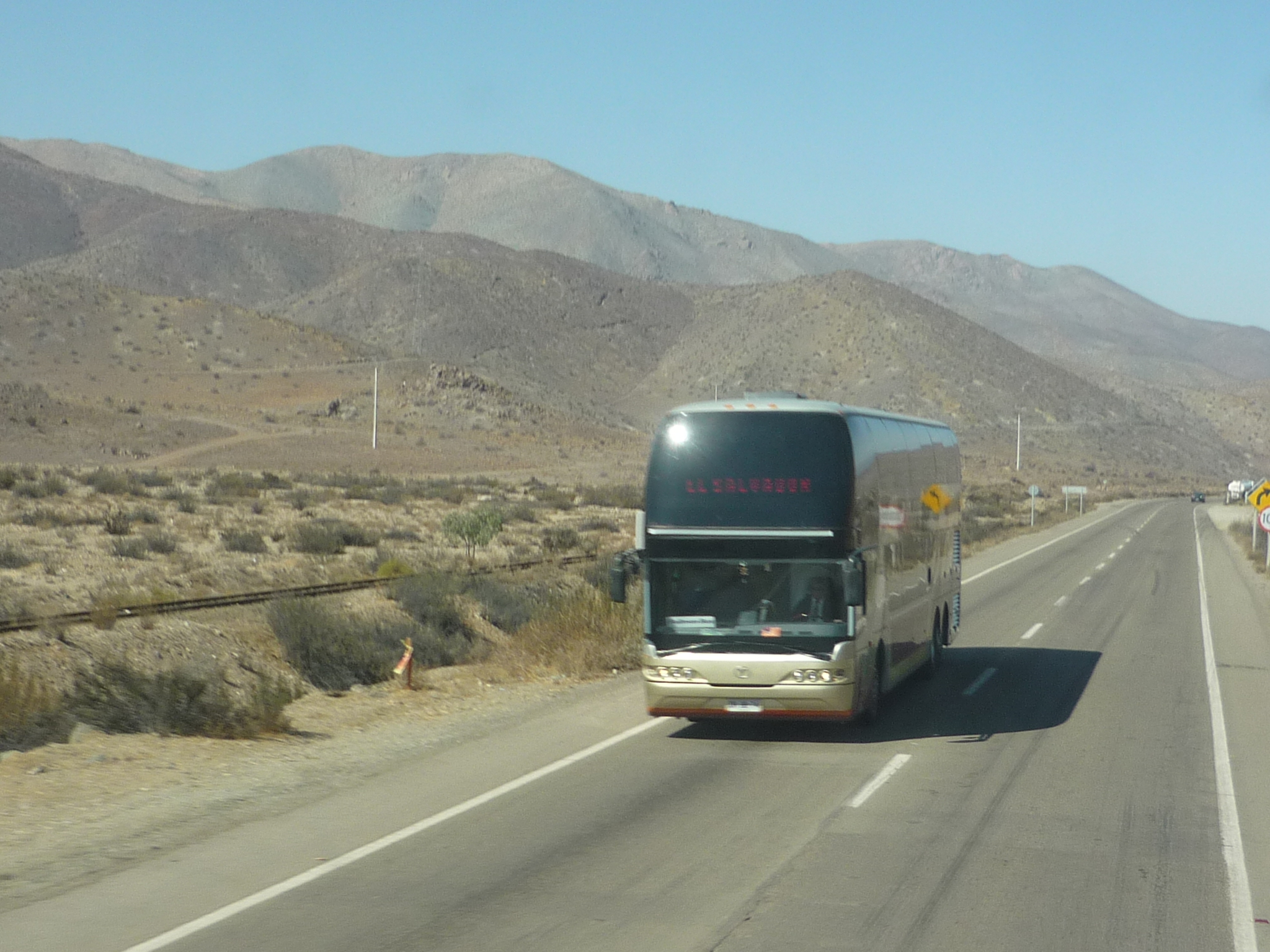
A Youngman-Neoplan JNP6137 Skyliner double decker bus near Incahuasi, Chile

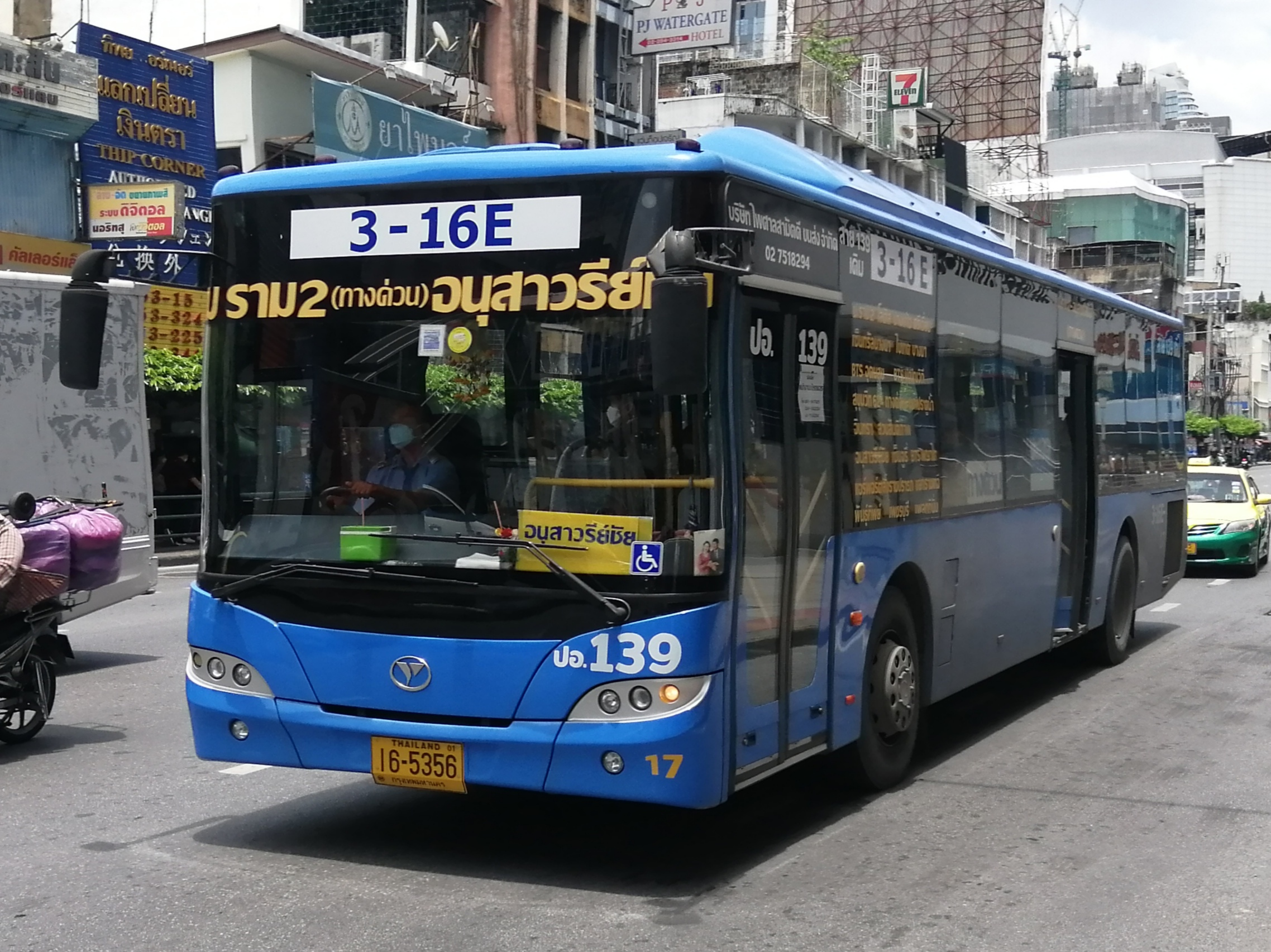
A Youngman-Neoplan JNP6120GC bus in Thailand
