= Pang Qingnian =

Pang Qingnian (simplified Chinese: 庞青年; traditional Chinese: 龐青年; born 1956) is a Chinese businessman and owner of Youngman Inc. He was born in Zhejiang province. Pang was honored as a national excellent entrepreneur in 1993 and founded Youngman in 2001. He has one child, Rachel Pang, who became Executive director at Youngman after she finished her university studies in England. According to Hurun Report's China Rich List 2013, he has an estimated personal fortune of around US$590 million, and is the 556th wealthiest person in China.
