= Europestar =

Chinese automotive brand

- Founded: 2008; 18 years ago
- Headquarters: Jinhua, China
- Parent: Youngman; Lotus Cars

Europestar (Chinese: 欧洲明星, pinyin: ōuzhōu míngxīng) is a Chinese automotive sub-brand of the British Lotus Group plc. The brand is the result of the joint-venture with the Chinese Jinhua Youngman Vehicle Co., Ltd. The brand was also known as Qingnian Kuaile (青年快乐(莲花); qīngnián (liánhuā)) or English: Youngman (Lotus).

The vehicles are manufactured in the prefecture-level city of Jinhua. The brand name is only used for export models. The Chinese homeland units are branded as Lotus Cars (莲花汽车; liánhuā qìchē). The actual British sports cars of the Lotus brand are imported by the company and retain its UK original logo. In addition, the sport models are marketed under the differentiated heading of Lotus Sports Cars (莲花跑车; liánhuā pǎochē).

The Europestar RCR, a 5-door liftback developed through a collaboration between Youngman Auto, Guizhou Aviation, and British Lotus Engineering, was launched in January 2008. Its assembly began later that year at Youngman’s Jinan plant following a CKD (Completely Knocked Down) process, which involves importing partially disassembled vehicles in kits to be assembled locally.

The brand’s second model, the Europestar Jingyue, was introduced at the 2008 Guangzhou Auto Show (November 2008). Sales of the RCR and Jingyue spanned 2008 and 2009; after that, Youngman shifted to marketing its vehicles as Lotus (Lianhua), phasing out the Europestar name.

The RCR (based on the Proton Gen-2) and Jingyue (a Proton Persona) were shown under the new respective names of Lotus L3 5-door and L3 4-door at the 2010 Beijing Auto Show. At the same time the larger L5 sedan and liftback, developed by Lotus Group, had its premier.

== Model Overview ==
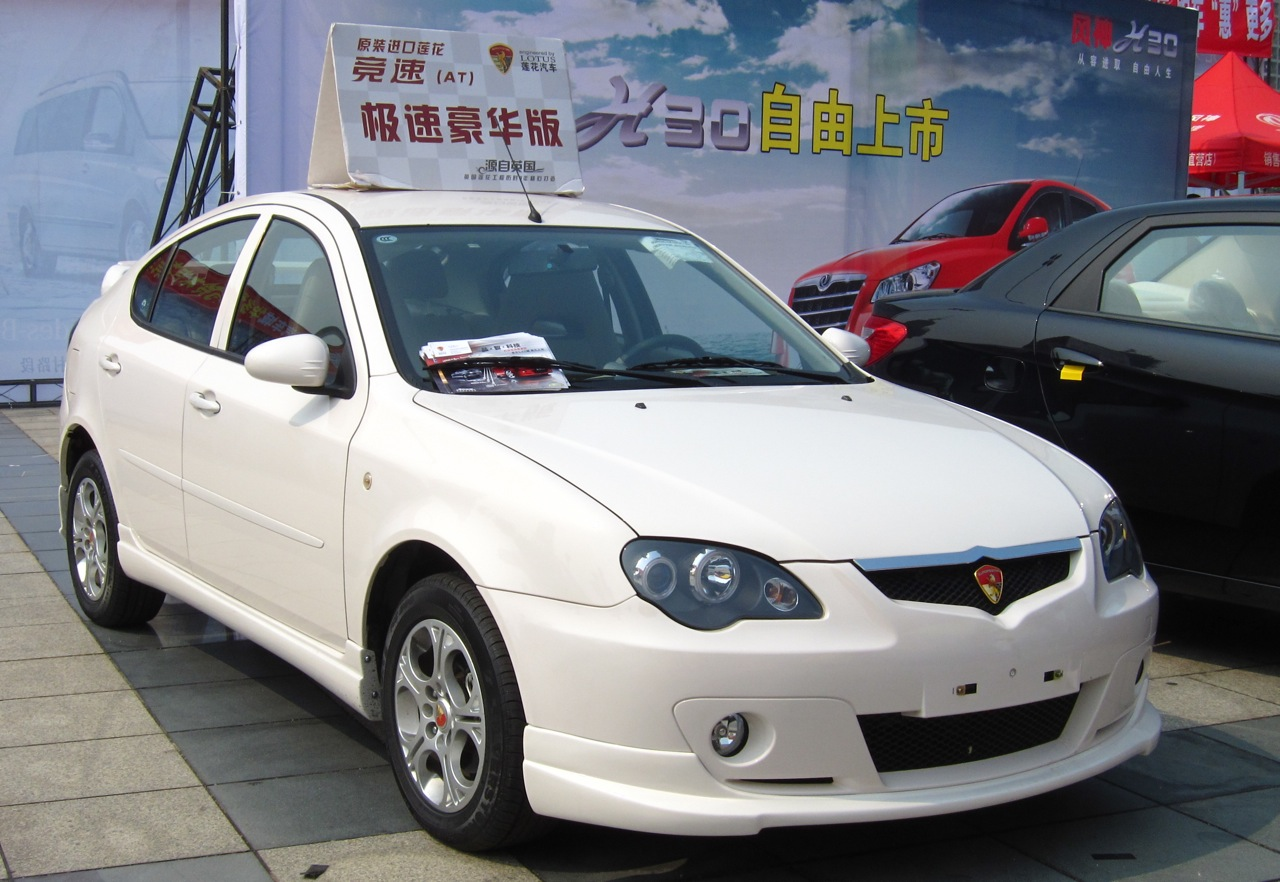
Europestar RCR

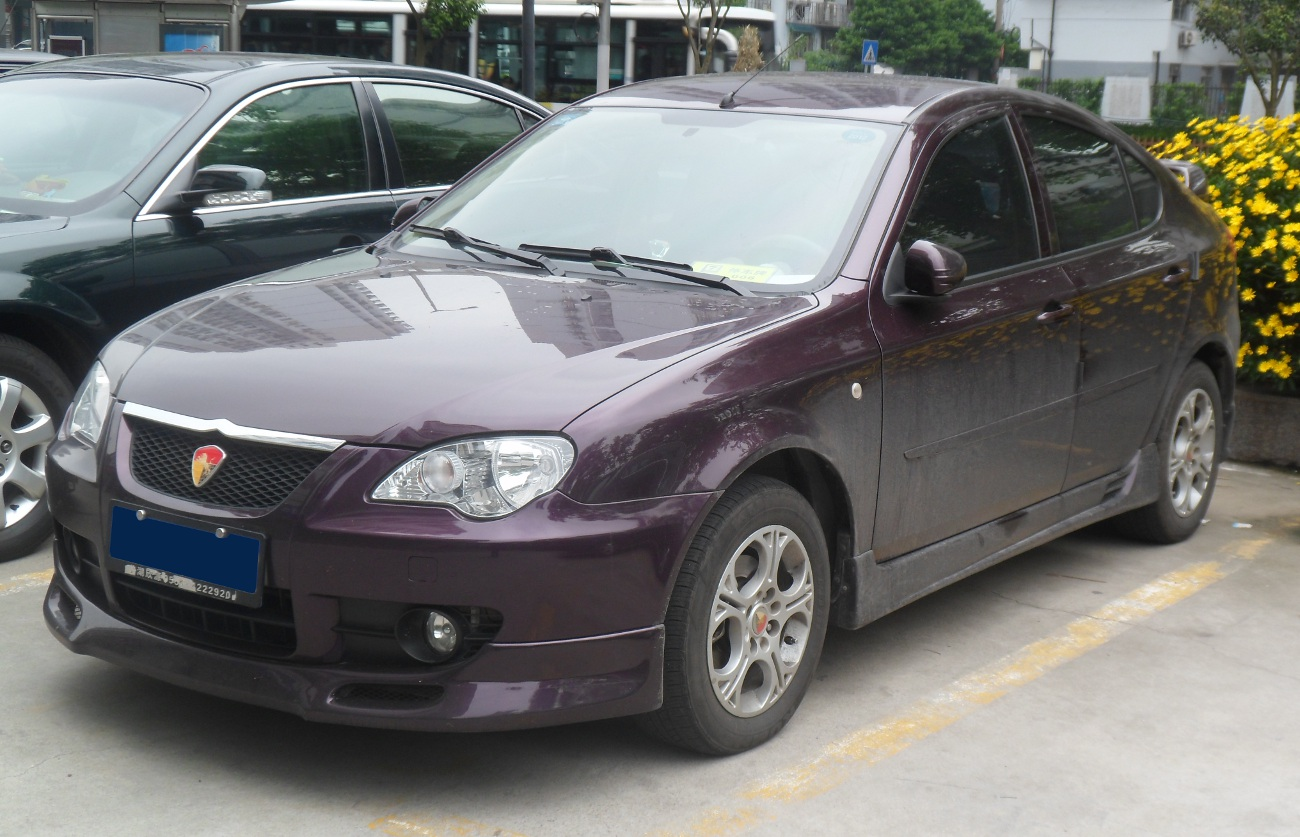
since 2008
Proton Gen-2 (莲花竞速)
Lotus L3 Hatchback (JingSu, RCR)
Europestar L3 Hatchback

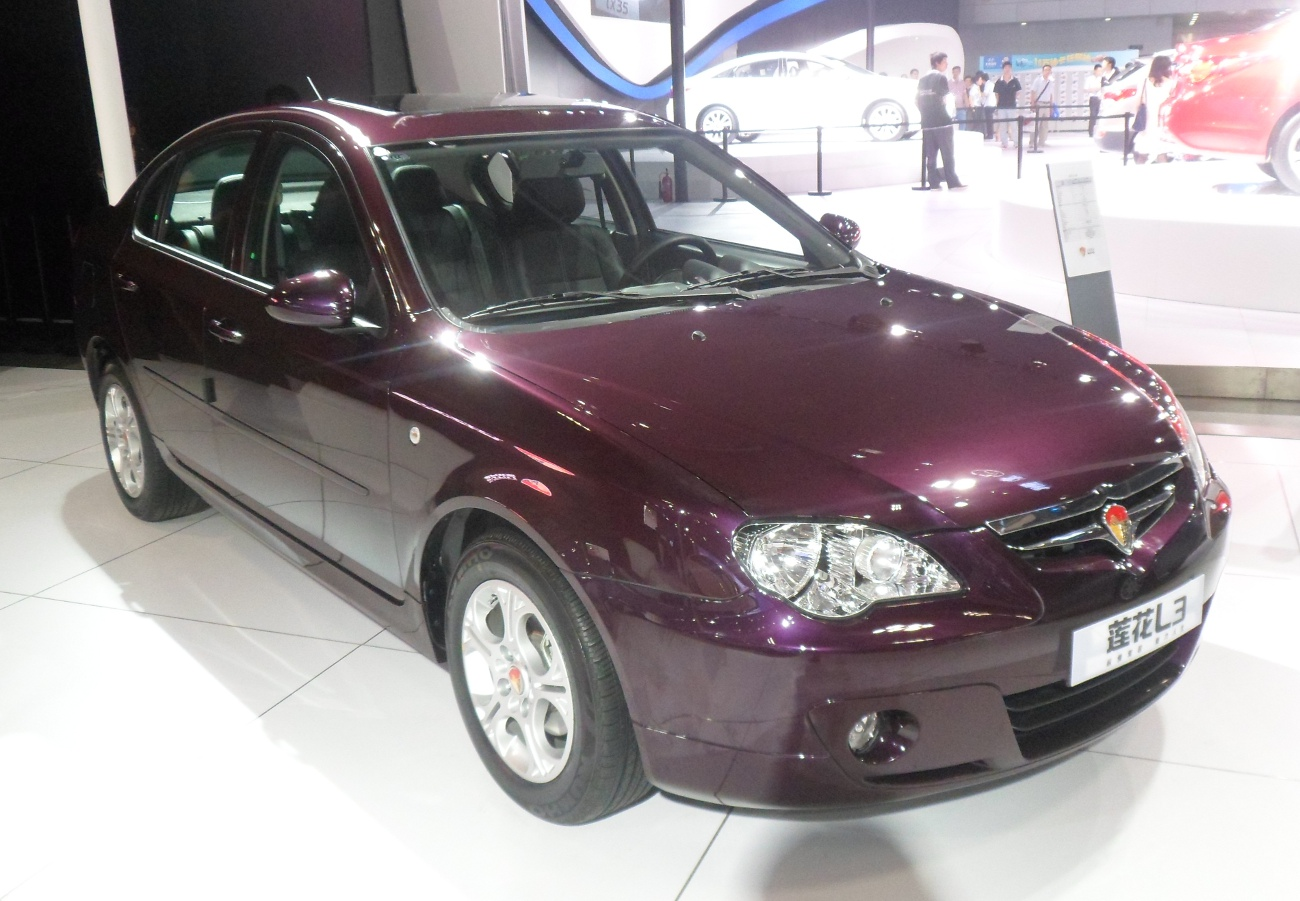
since 2008
Proton Persona (莲花竞悦)
Lotus L3 Sedan (JingYue)
Europestar L3 Sedan

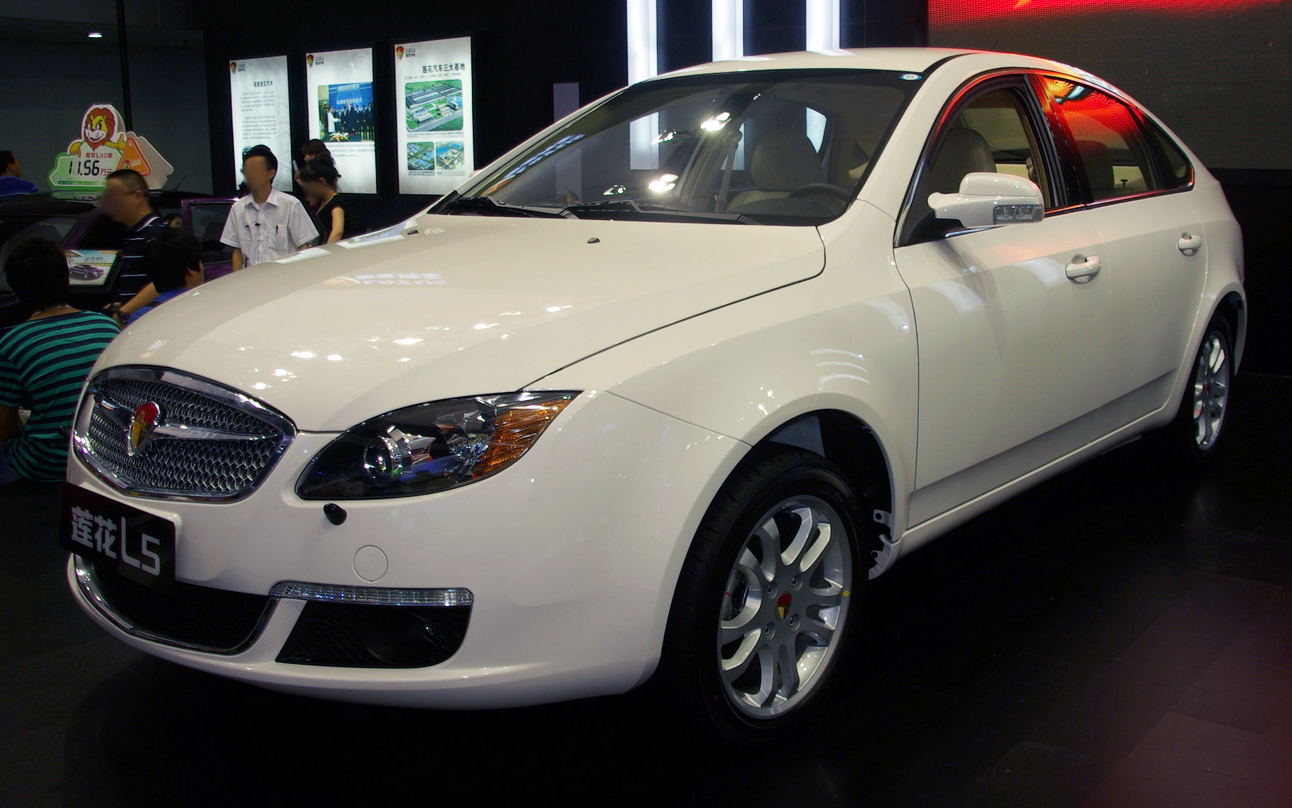
since 2010
莲花 L5
Lotus L5
Europestar L5
