= Proton Saga (third generation) =

Third generation of Proton Saga

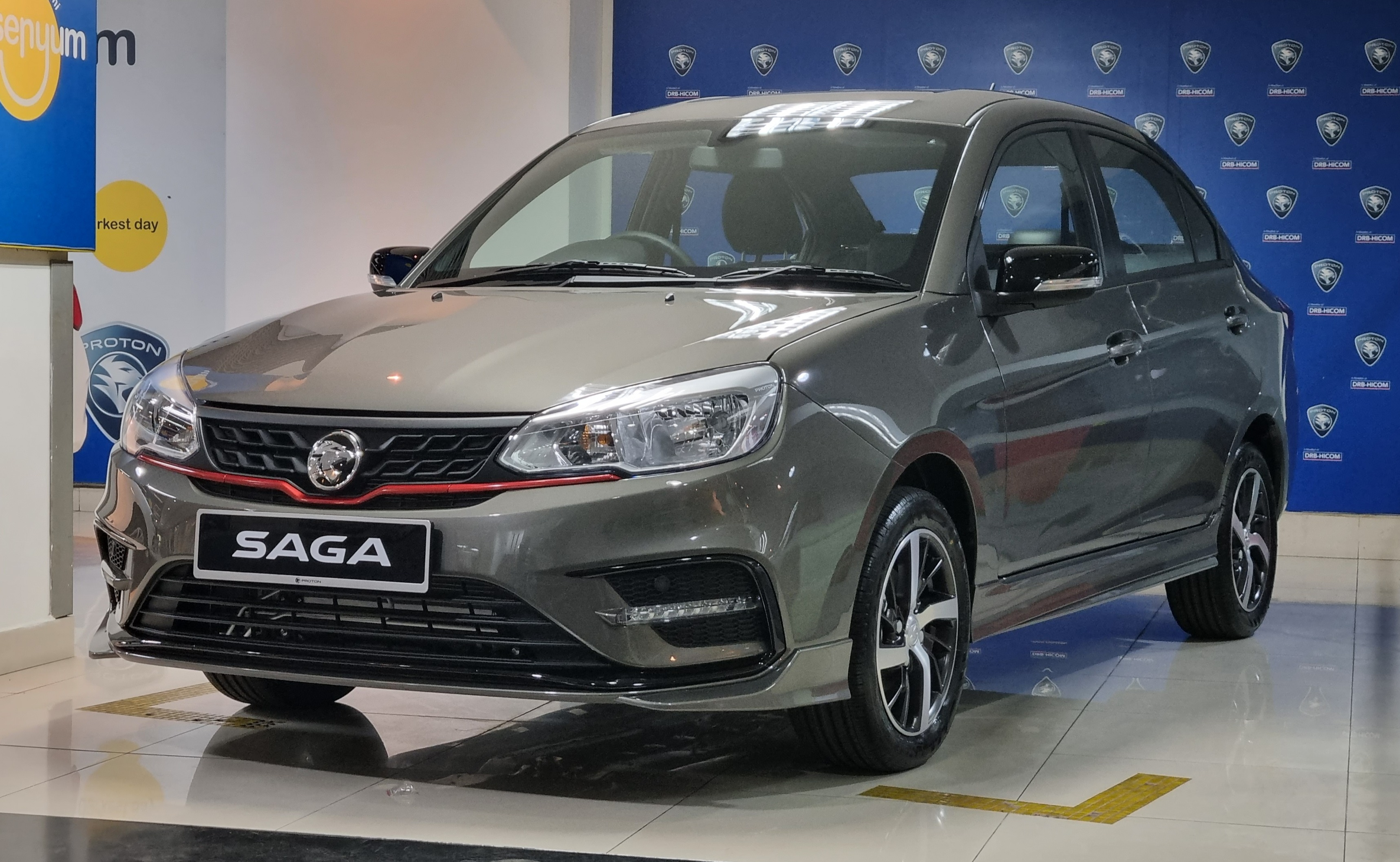
- 2022 Proton Saga Premium S

Overview
- Manufacturer: Proton
- Model code: P2-13A
- Production: September 2016 – October 2025; November 2025−present (Proton Saga MC3 I-GT)
- Assembly: Malaysia: Shah Alam; Bangladesh: Chittagong (PHP); Kenya: Mombasa (AVA); Pakistan: Karachi (Al-Haj Automotive); Egypt: Cairo (Ezz Elsewedy Automotive Factories (ESAF))
- Designer: Azlan Othman

Body and chassis
- Class: City car (A)
- Body style: 4-door sedan
- Layout: Front-engine, front-wheel drive

Powertrain
- Engine: Petrol: 1.3 L S4PE I4; 1.5 L BHE15 I4
- Transmission: 5-speed manual 4-speed automatic (Note: Hyundai (2019−2023); Aisin (2023−present)); Punch Powertrain CVT (2016–2019, 2025−present)

Dimensions
- Wheelbase: 2,465 mm (97.0 in)
- Length: 4,335 mm (170.7 in)
- Width: 1,690 mm (66.5 in)
- Height: 1,515 mm (59.6 in)
- Kerb weight: 1,061–1,085 kg (2,339–2,392 lb)

Chronology
- Predecessor: Proton Saga (second generation)
- Successor: Proton Saga (fourth generation)

The third generation Proton Saga, codenamed P2-13A, is an A-segment saloon engineered by Malaysian automobile manufacturer Proton. It was launched on 28 September 2016 as the successor to the second generation Proton Saga.

The third generation Saga is based on the outgoing Saga FLX platform and is powered by the Iriz's 1.3-litre VVT engine. Proton has completely re-engineered the exterior design of the new Saga. Its interior has been revamped and refined with an emphasis on NVH reduction.

The third generation Saga is positioned as Proton's entry-level sedan, below the larger B-segment Persona. Safety standards have been improved with the introduction of electronic stability control (ESC) and a 20% stronger body structure. ASEAN NCAP has awarded a 4-star safety rating for the new Saga.

== History ==
=== Post-launch ===
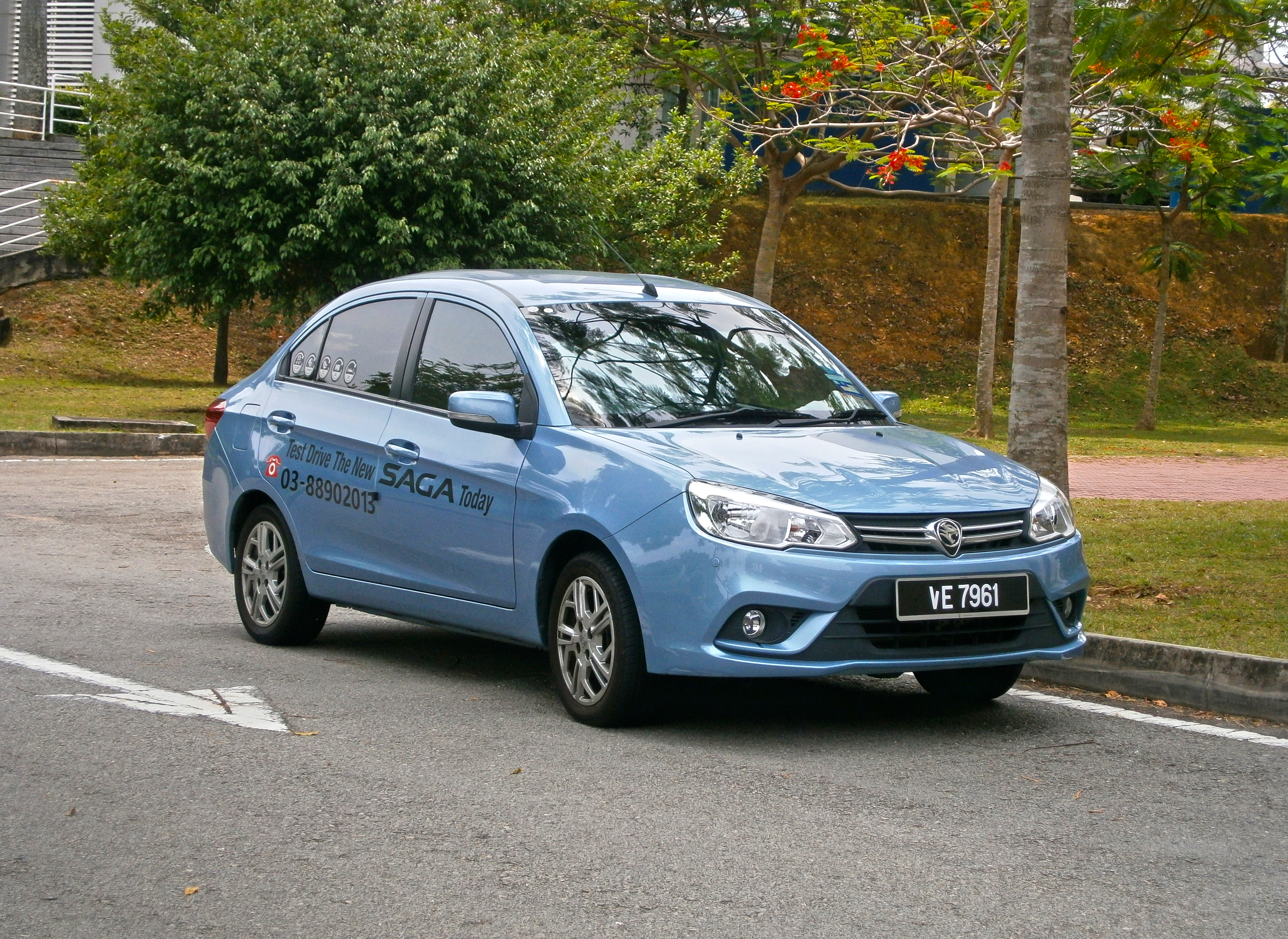
Front view

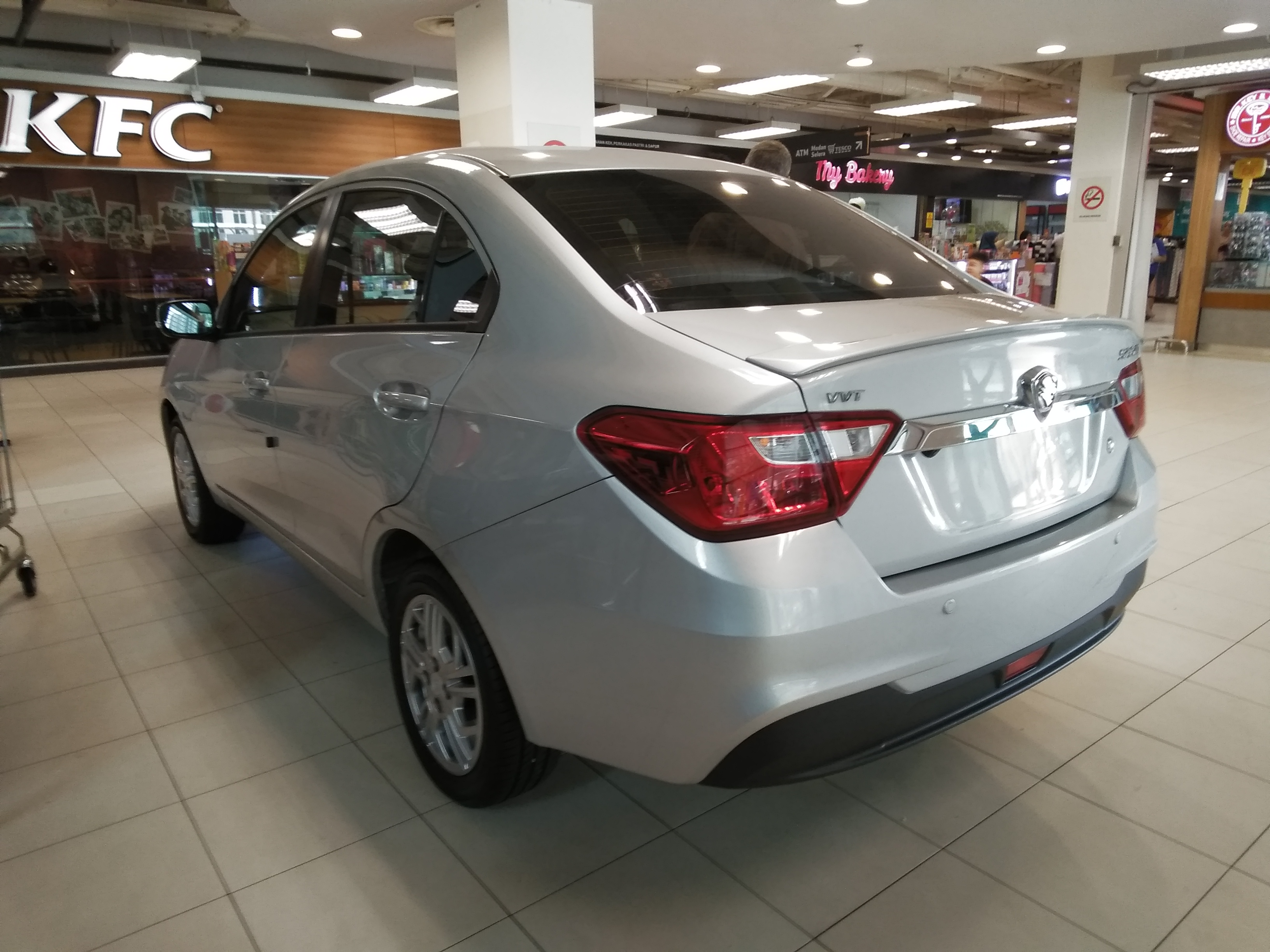
Rear view

The third generation Proton Saga was officially launched on 28 September 2016 at Setia City Convention Centre in Shah Alam, Malaysia. The launch event was covered in an exclusive live broadcast by paultan.org, and was endorsed by Khairy Jamaluddin on behalf of the then Ministry of Youth and Sports.

The third generation Saga is the latest Proton model to use an existing nameplate and directly replaces the second generation Saga which was produced from early 2008 to late 2016. The new Saga launched approximately one month after the new Persona, its larger and more sophisticated sibling.

The third generation Saga is based on Saga FLX platform, its predecessor but the exterior and interior design has been completely re-engineered. The new Saga is powered by the Iriz's 1.3-litre VVT engine and CVT combination, both of which have been further refined for improved fuel efficiency, reduced NVH and smoother driving experience.

At launch, four variants of the new Saga were made available, namely the Standard MT, Standard CVT, Executive CVT and Premium CVT. The various trim levels differ mainly in terms of kit, cosmetic enhancements, and safety features, but are otherwise mechanically identical.

Twin airbags are standard across the range, but ABS is not available on the entry-level Standard, and ESC is reserved for the range-topping Premium. ASEAN NCAP has awarded a four-star rating for all variants of the new Saga.

As of 17 October 2016, Proton has received 6,000 bookings for the new Saga, of which 1,000 have been delivered. Proton is targeting sales of 5,000 units a month.

Proton has announced plans to export the third generation Saga to right-hand drive ASEAN markets, as well as Chile. Production for export markets will commence in early 2017. In January 2021, it was reported that the third generation Saga was undergoing evaluation in Pakistan by Al-Haj Group. The 5-speed manual transmission and the four-speed automatic transmission variants are being brought to Pakistan, coupled with the 1299 cc engine under the hood. This is due to tax benefits for cars that have engines that are no larger than 1300 cc, helping to keep the car affordable.

On 6 August 2019, a first facelifted Proton Saga was launched at the Malaysia International Trade and Exhibition Centre in Kuala Lumpur, Malaysia. It's considered as minor change internally but as a facelift to the general public. The naturally aspirated DOHC VVT engine is no longer paired to a CVT made by Punch Powertrain, but a four-speed torque converter automatic gearbox sourced from Hyundai. The Executive variant was dropped with the range consisting of Standard MT, Standard AT and Premium AT.

On 21 August 2020, Proton announced exports of the Saga to Kenya via local franchise holder Simba Corp. The Saga is locally assembled from imported CKD packs at Simba Corp's Associated Vehicle Assemblers (AVA) plant in Mombasa. The decision to assemble the Saga locally was made to keep prices competitive by reducing import taxes, and to spur Kenya's automotive industry with employment creation and skill transfer. The Saga was officially launched in Kenya on 10 December 2020.

On 18 December 2020, it was announced that the Saga will be exported to Nepal when Jagdamba Motors, the Nepalese automotive company starts operations there by January 2021. The vehicle was officially launched on 14 January 2021.

On 12 May 2022, a second facelifted Proton Saga MC2 was launched inside Proton Centre of Excellence in Shah Alam, Malaysia. At launch, Proton introduced the new Premium S AT variant, followed with Standard Lite AT on 26 August 2022, besides the remaining Standard MT, Standard AT and Premium AT variants. The powertrain and features of second-facelifted Proton Saga remain unchanged with minor upgrades and modifications.

On 31 May 2022, Proton Sagas are shipped to South Africa with X50s and X70s through South African's CMH Group company as distributor.

On 12 September 2024, Proton started the shipment of the first batch of Proton Saga production components to Egypt with Ezz Elsewedy Automotive Factories (ESAF). These components will be used for local assembly, with plans of exporting the finished vehicles to North African and Middle Eastern markets.

According to a market insight, Proton claims that 64% of Saga buyers are first-time car buyers, 18% are additional car buyers and the remaining 17% are replacement car buyers. Of the 57,674 samples taken for a survey in late 2024, about 59% of the buyers are male, while 41% are female. Furthermore, 48% are married with children and 41% are single.

== Design ==
The new third generation Saga continues to utilise the second generation Saga platform, which underpinned the previous BLM, FL and FLX models between 2008 and 2016. The second generation Saga is in turn based on an extended Proton Savvy platform, dating back to 2005. The model or platform code 'BT', which Proton has assigned to the third generation Saga is similarly used for all second-generation Saga variants, in addition to the Savvy. Nonetheless, in the latest 2016 platform revision, Proton has extended both front and rear overhangs and re-engineered the entire body structure to warrant a generational leap. The interior has also been revamped, with a focus on increased refinement as well as tactile or perceived quality.

The third generation Saga was developed at a cost of RM150 million. Proton aims to break-even in 3 years with a monthly sales target of 5,000 units. The company has kept development costs relatively low by recycling as much as 60% of parts and components from the outgoing Saga, and by borrowing some equipment from other Proton models. Proton has announced that an updated Saga will launch in 2025, as the company intends to maintain a shorter 5-year product cycle with their best-selling Saga nameplate.

=== Exterior ===
The third generation Proton Saga measures 4,331 mm long, 1,689 mm wide and 1,491 mm tall. The wheelbase length at 2,465 mm has remained unchanged since the Saga BLM, but both front and rear overhangs have been extended by 44mm and 30mm respectively. The boot volume is rated at 420 litres, 7 litres larger than the outgoing model. The third generation Saga is approximately 74mm longer, 9mm wider and 11mm shorter than the Saga BLM and 53mm longer, 9mm wider and 29mm shorter than the Saga FL and Saga FLX family.

Despite the fact that the third generation Saga is all-round larger than its second-generation siblings, it is marketed as an A-segment or A+-segment sedan. In contrast, the second generation Saga was classified as a B-segment model throughout its life cycle. The disparity in size and classification is the result of Proton's revised marketing strategy which aims to prevent product overlapping and sales cannibalisation. The Saga has ceded the B-segment sedan bracket to the new Proton Persona, and would no longer offer a 1.6-litre engine option. Nonetheless, the Saga will continue on sale as Proton's most affordable sedan, a distinction which it has held for over 31 years.

The third generation Saga shares its platform with the outgoing generation, but its 'top hat' or body in white (BIW) is all-new as the result of extensive re-engineering during its development process. With the exception of the wing mirror housings, all other exterior body panels are new and unique to the third generation Saga. The new Saga has a sleeker external profile, and its drag coefficient has been reduced to 0.33 Cd. Proton's three new 2016 sedans, namely the Perdana, Persona and Saga were all designed concurrently, resulting in a strong family resemblance. The new Saga features halogen reflector headlamps like its predecessors, but its rear lamps have reverted to more conventional bulb-based lighting as opposed to LEDs, to cut costs and pricing. However, all new Saga variants get a rear fog light as standard and Proton lettering inserts for both front and rear lamps. The new Saga is also the third model to feature Proton's new sculptured, three-dimensional badge.

The various cosmetic enhancements in the new Saga are preset according to their respective trim levels. The door handles are matte black on the Standard variants, but are painted in the body colour in the Executive and Premium lines. The wing mirror housings are also matte in the Standard, but are body coloured in the Executive and Premium. The wing mirrors do not incorporate a power-folding feature, but are nonetheless power-adjustable in the Executive and Premium. The B-pillars are body colour coded in the Standard, but are blacked out in the Executive and Premium. The rear garnish is matte black in the Standard, body-colored in the Executive, and chrome plated in the Premium. A rear boot lid lip spoiler is only fitted on the Executive and Premium lines.

The Standard is equipped with 13-inch steel rims and hubcaps carried over from the second generation Saga. Both Executive and Premium variants feature new alloy wheels. Proton has fitted their 14-inch 'snowflake' Y-spoke rims on the Executive, and 15-inch 'turbine' split-spoke rims on the Premium. Front fog lights are only available on the Executive and Premium lines. The 2016 Saga was produced in six colours, namely Fire Red, Cotton White, Topaz Blue, Sterling Silver, Midnight Black, and Metal Grey.

The 2019 Proton Saga key design changes include revised front fascia with Proton's new infinite weave design language and Proton lettering on the rear as well as redesigned front and rear bumpers. The Standard MT variant features 14-inch steel rims and hubcaps last seen with Proton's Iriz design concepts and Standard AT features single tone 14-inch alloy wheels. Premium AT variants get 15-inch dual-tone alloy wheels. Front and rear fog lamps is discontinued with LED DRL's taking the place of the front fog lamps on the Premium AT variant. On Standard variants, in place of LED DRL's is a body colour plastic piece with a similar design to that found on B-Line Saga BLM's. Power-adjustable wing mirrors are standard for all variants. The 2019 Saga is produced in five colours, namely Snow White, Armoured Silver, Jet Grey, Rosewood Maroon and Ruby Red.

The 2022 Proton Saga shows off the latest roundel logo and curved Ethereal Bow strip cradling the logo under the remaining Infinite Weave design language instead of the straight strip of 2019 Saga. Both Premium AT and Premium S AT variants get 15-inch new design "four-spoke look" of alloy wheels, with monotone finishing on Premium and dual-tone finishing on Premium S. Side mirror housings of both Premium and Premium S variants are black-painted instead of body colour of 2019 Saga Premium variant. Premium S variant differs with Premium variant by addition of side skirtings, side-cornered front bumper skirtings, red-painted Ethereal Bow strip, black-painted rear number plate garnish, smart key button and exterior boot-opening button. The colours for 2022 Saga remain unchanged.

=== Interior ===
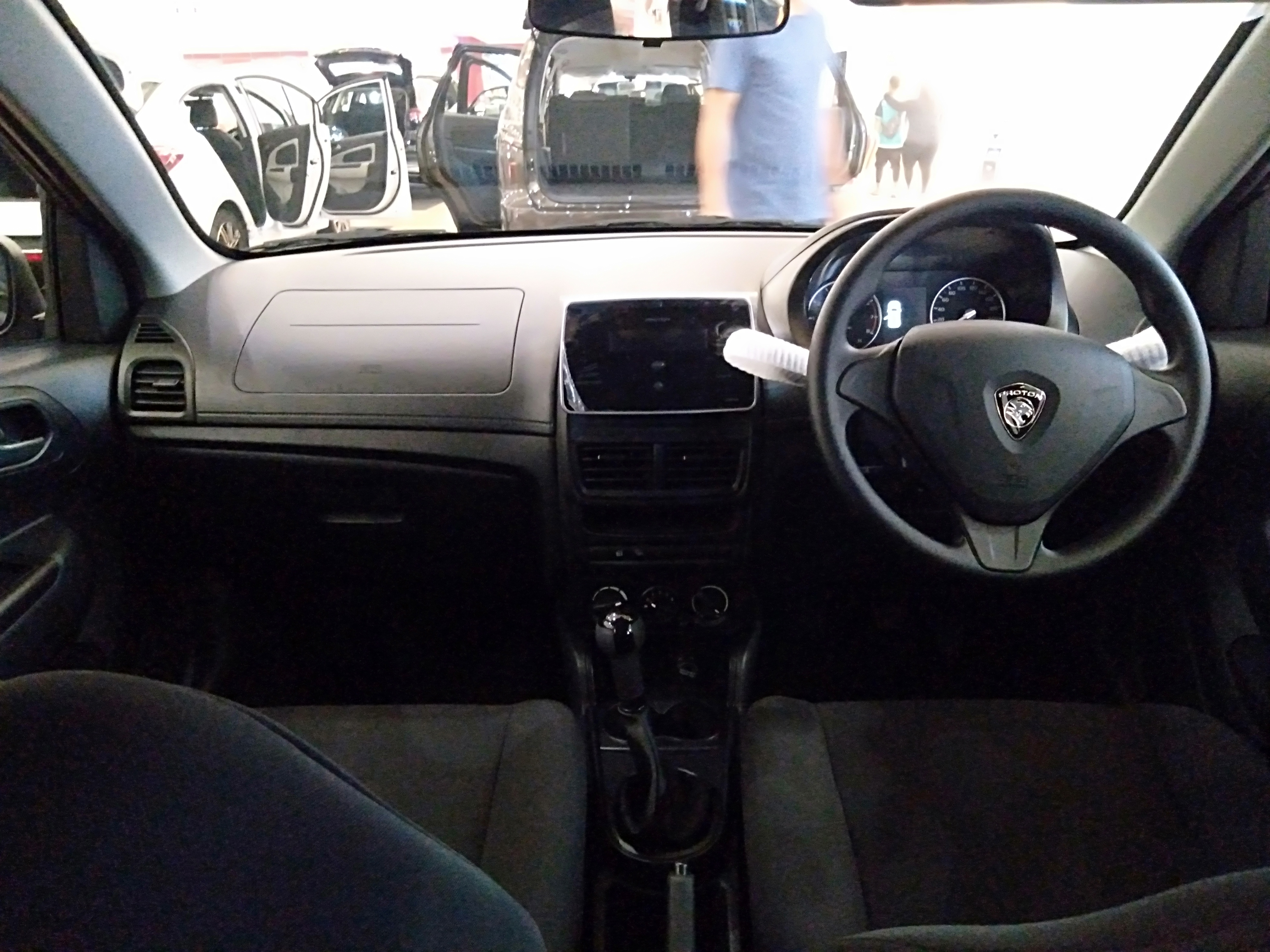
2021 Proton Saga Interior (Standard model)

The interior of the third generation Saga has been revamped and updated in line with Proton's current design language and technical capabilities. Nonetheless, the mounting points for the dashboard, vents, seats and other key modules in the cabn remained largely unchanged as a result of the platform carryover. The interior of the new Saga consists of all-new parts and components, as well as borrowed ones, with only minimal carryovers from the outgoing generation. Proton had also invested considerably in solutions to reduce transmissions of noise, vibration and harshness (NVH) into the cabin, in an effort to create a more mature and refined Saga.

The cabin of the third generation Saga incorporates several major changes and additions. All door cards and dashboard panels are new, and feature faux-stitching texture in some areas. The centre console, air-con vents, glove box, seats, gear lever enclosure and instrument binnacle have also been redesigned. The revised interior door handles have been moved slightly forwards and upwards. Proton has also fitted a new single-DIN head unit on the Standard and Executive variants. The central tunnel cover has been revised and all variants feature twin USB charging ports behind the handbrake, along with a storage compartment to store the device that is being charged. The push-button controls on the centre console are also new.

Several interior parts and components in the new Saga were borrowed from other Proton models in an effort to increase economies of scale and reduce costs and pricing. These include the steering wheel, CVT gear lever and driver's power window controls on all variants, as well as the Premium-exclusive double-DIN head unit and integrated rear view mirror display. The notable carryovers from the second generation Saga include the air-con controls, handbrake lever and manual gear knob. The driver's instrument cluster is largely unchanged, but the meter graphics have been updated, and the HUD includes Proton's ECO Drive Assist system, an indicator which lights up in green when the car is being driven in an economical manner.

At the back, legroom has improved slightly courtesy of the scalloped front seat back design. The rear bench is less reclined than before, and can be fully folded in all variants for increased storage space. However, the rear bench does not split-fold, and the aperture is limited as a consequence of the old platform design. Proton has also improved how the front and rear doors open and close, to increase tactile or perceived quality. The doors required less effort to operate, and offer a more reassuring or 'solid' feel in comparison to older Proton models.

All variants of the new Saga are fitted with all-round power windows and central locking. Additionally, the steering wheel is tilt-adjustable, while the driver's seat can be adjusted for height. The interior of the new Saga is all-black with the exception of the roof padding, sun visors and pillar covers. There are ten storage compartments, two cup holders and four bottle holders in total.

Proton has specified fabric seat upholstery for all variants of the new Saga. The seats have a mesh pattern in the Executive and a wavy design on the Premium, but are plain black in the Standard. The Executive model receives glossy grey accents on the outer air-con vents and steering wheel, while the Premium adds on more glossy grey finishing on the gear lever.

Two different head units are offered in the new Saga. The Standard and Executive variants are equipped with a new single-DIN head unit, while the Premium model gets a larger double-DIN head unit paired to steering wheel audio switches. Both head units have radio, Bluetooth, USB, AUX and CD/MP3 playback. Audio is channelled to twin front and rear speakers in the Executive and Premium lines, and twin rear speakers in the Standard. The Premium model is equipped with a reverse camera that is linked to a LCD which is built into the rear view mirror. Twin rear USB charging ports are standard on all variants.

The 2019 Saga saw the air conditioning vents moved down to allow space for 'floating' head units, a revised gear selector for automatic variants and the air conditioning controls markings became white only. The Standard variants features a double din like-sized head unit with captive buttons that are not visible without illumination. This is a similar head unit to that found in Persona, Iriz and Exora Standard. The Premium variant meanwhile has a head unit that runs a modified version of Android. Do note that it is not fitted with GKUI and does not support Proton's Hi Proton voice recognition feature. Other interior changes saw the inclusion of a LED map light for the driver and front passenger, different material used for headliner and grab handles that are not fixed but rather can be pulled down when in use and automatically retracts when not in use. Do note that these changes in addition to the 2 rear USB chargers are not present in the Standard MT variant. A reverse camera became linked to the head unit opposed to the rear view mirror and revised seat pattern for the Premium AT rounds up the interior changes and revisions.

The 2022 Saga shows off the revised center cluster, redesigned semi-digital air-conditioner controls and new Proton logo emblem at steering. Unlike 2019 Saga export counterparts and as speculated before, 2022 Saga remains its center console like its previous domestic counterpart. Seat upholstery for both Standard and Premium variants also remains, whereas semi-leatherette type is reserved exclusively for Premium S variant. Premium S variant differs from other variants with additional red accents like yellow accents of 2021 Anniversary Saga, leatherette-wrapped steering wheel, black headlining, updated infotainment system, auto-fold side mirrors and engine start-stop button.

== Proton Saga MC3 I-GT (2025−present) ==
Proton Saga
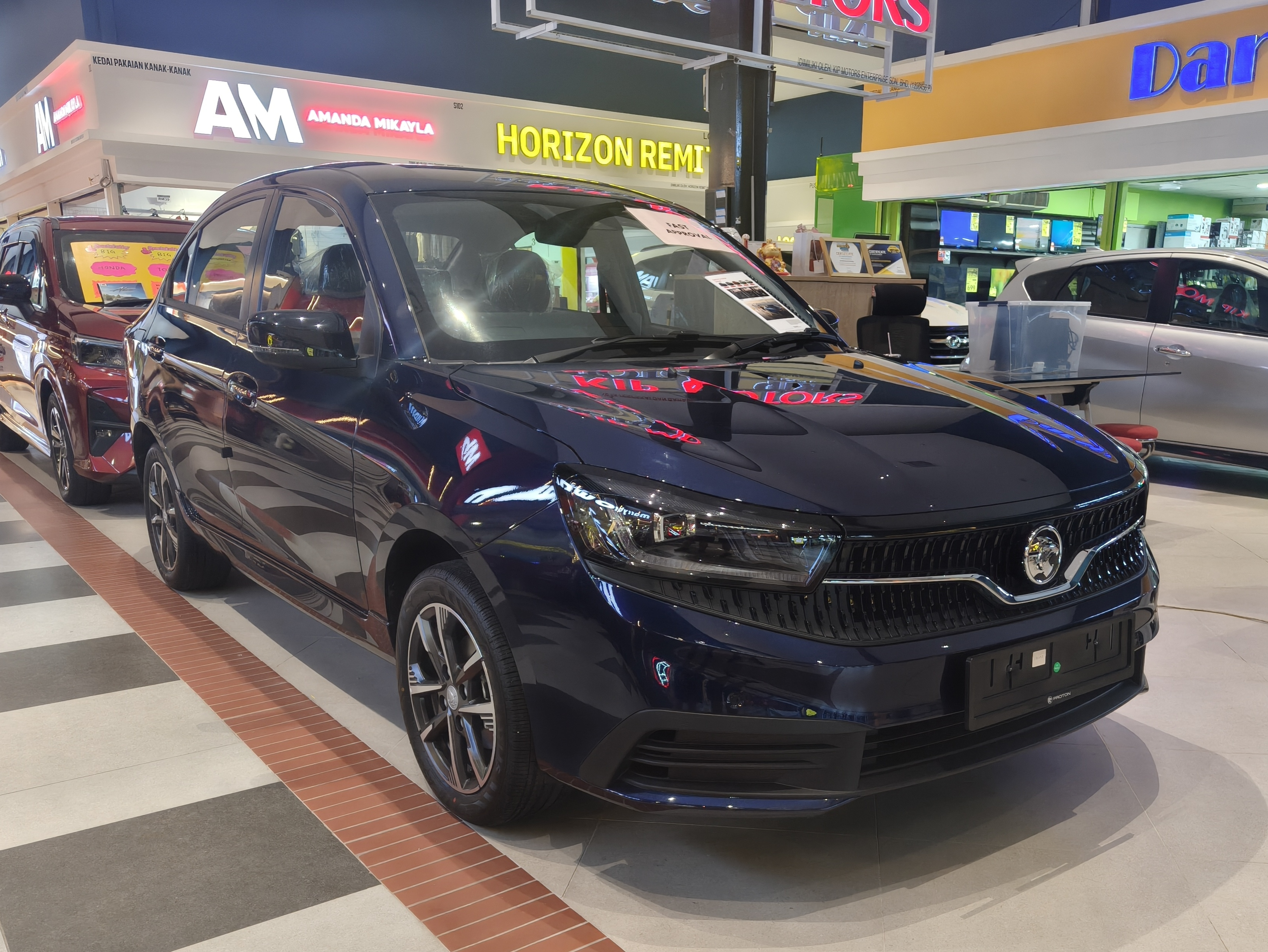

Overview
- Production: November 2025 − present
- Assembly: Malaysia: Proton City (PTMSB, 2025–present)

Body and chassis
- Body style: 4-door sedan
- Platform: Proton AMA

Powertrain
- Engine: 1.5L BHE15PFI 4-cylinder
- Transmission: Aisin 4-speed automatic Punch Powertrain CVT

Dimensions
- Wheelbase: 2,465 mm (97.0 in)
- Length: 4,390 mm (172.8 in)
- Width: 1,690 mm (66.5 in)
- Height: 1,525 mm (60.0 in)
- Curb weight: 1,055–1,085 kg (2,326–2,392 lb)

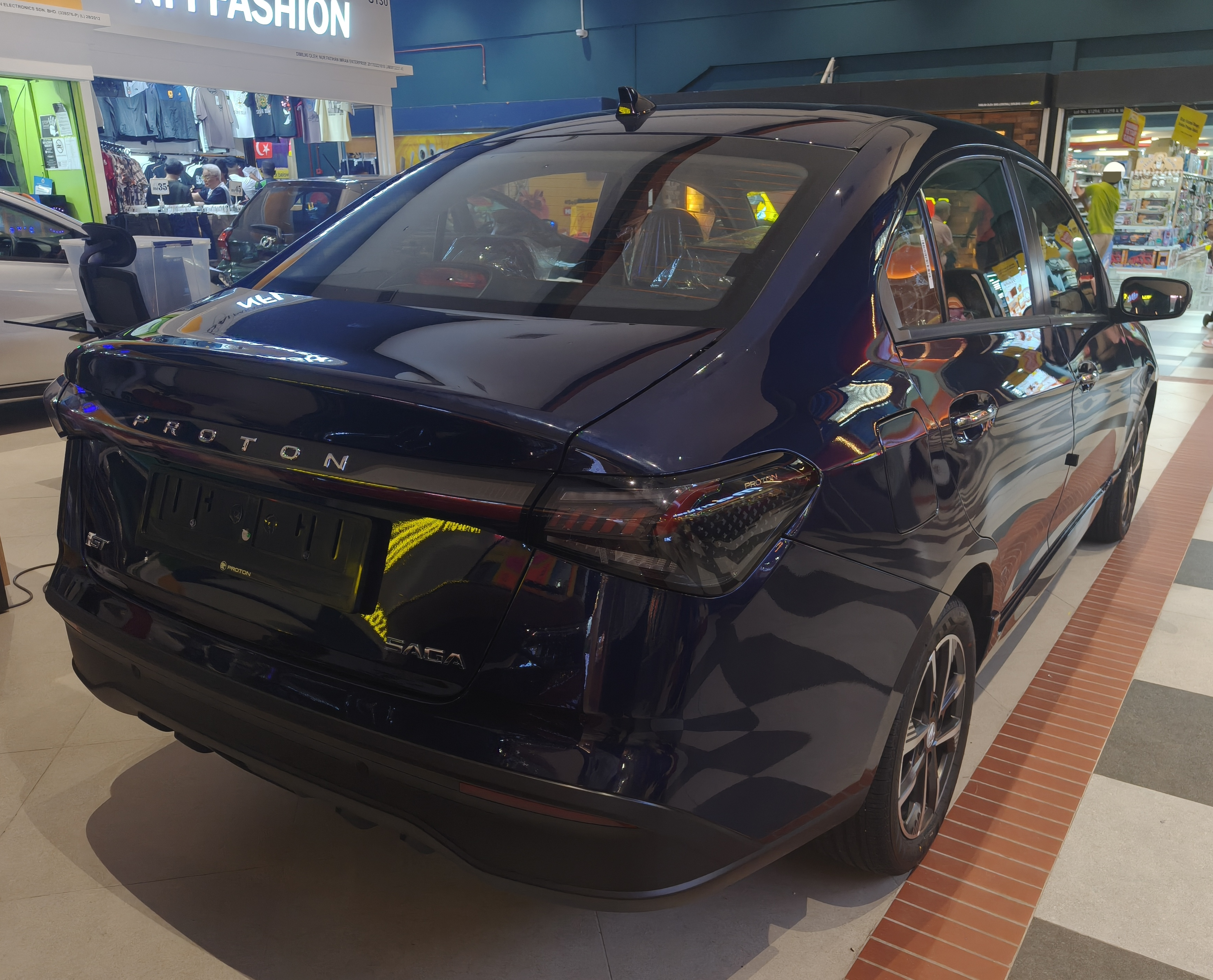
Rear view

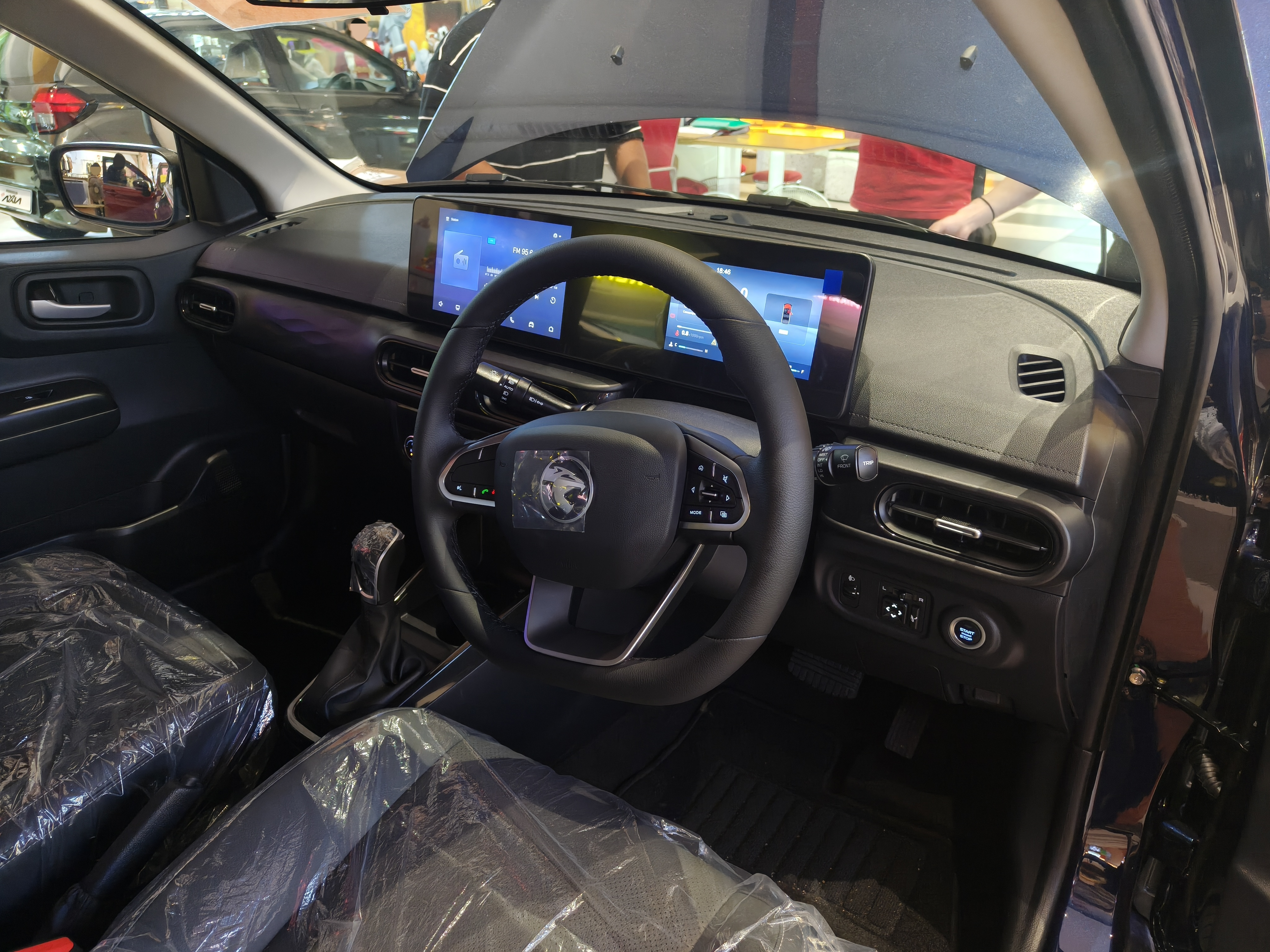
Interior

On 27 November 2025, Proton unveiled a third facelift of the Proton Saga. It was called the Proton Saga MC3 I-GT was launched on 27 November 2025, three variants were available: Standard, Executive and Premium. For engines, all variants are powered by the new BHE15PFI 1.5-litre petrol engine, with the Standard and Executive are paired with the Aisin-sourced 4-speed automatic while the Premium variant paired with the Punch Powertrain CVT.

In December 2025, it was reported that the Saga was to be sold in the Philippines with Geely badging.

== Safety ==
ASEAN NCAP test results Proton Saga (2016)
Test	Points	Stars
Adult occupant:	13.33	4 /5 stars
Child occupant:	71%	4 /5 stars
Safety assist:	NA	

ASEAN NCAP test results Proton Saga (2025)
Test	Points
Overall:	4 /5 stars
Adult occupant:	29.65
Child occupant:	14.97
Safety assist:	13.33
Motorcyclist Safety:	8.75

Safety standards in the third generation Saga have improved considerably over its predecessors. The new Saga is the first in its lineage to offer electronic stability control (ESC) in its home market. Its body structure has also been strengthened and torsional rigidity has increased by 20%. Handling and steering response have both improved with an emphasis on safety and ride comfort.

However, overall safety specifications in the new Saga are not up to par with its larger siblings, the Iriz and Persona. The disparity is due to the Saga's continued reliance on an older platform, as well as pricing considerations with regards to its market positioning as Proton's entry-level product.

=== Active ===
The third generation Saga is the latest Proton model to feature the company's new Vehicle Dynamic Control (VDC) program. VDC is an active safety net which includes an anti-lock braking system (ABS) with electronic brakeforce distribution (EBD) and brake assist (BA), hill-hold assist (HHA), traction control (TCS) and electronic stability control (ESC).

The sole purpose of the VDC program is to prevent or minimise the risks of a potential accident. Up to ten computer systems monitor all four wheels in addition to the driver's steering, throttle and braking input, in real time. Should the VDC system detect a loss of traction, an audible alarm is sounded to inform the driver, whilst the ESC and TCS components automatically apply braking or acceleration pressure and reduce engine speed to prevent oversteer or understeer, ensuring that the driver remains in control. Should the driver apply the brakes in an emergency, the ABS component prevents the wheels from locking up, while EBD assigns appropriate brake force to each wheel and BA increases braking pressure to bring the car to a safe and complete stop. The HHA component prevents the car from rolling backwards whilst on a hill, should the brake pedal be released.

Nonetheless, the VDC program is not standard fit across the Saga range. The entry-level Saga Standard does not offer any VDC components. The mid-range Saga Executive adds on ABS, EBD and BA. The range-topping Saga Premium is the only variant to receive ESC, TCS and HHA.

The brakes in the new Saga consist of ventilated discs at the front but drums at the back. Proton has equipped 175/70R13 Silverstone Synergy M3 tyres on the Standard variants, 185/60R14 Silverstone Kruizer1 NS800 tyres on the Executive, and 185/55R15 Silverstone Kruizer1 NS800 tyres on the Premium respectively. The new Saga has a kerb weight of between 1,035 kg and 1,075 kg depending on the variant.

The suspension setup in the third generation Saga, like the FLX previously, consists of MacPherson struts with stabiliser bars at the front and torsion beam axles at the rear. However, Proton has fitted new springs and dampers, as well as a new strut bar in the engine bay for improved handling and control. Proton has also lowered the steering ratio to 16:1 from 20:1 previously, and reduced the steering effort to 2.75 kgf from 3.0 kgf. The steering rack angle is became steeper and allows for a tighter turning radius of 5.1 m compared to 5.3 m previously.

The third generation Saga continues to utilise a hydraulic power steering system, which offers more engaging steering feedback at the expense of lighter steering effort. Front parking sensors are standard on all Saga variants. The two front sensors, located just below the headlamps, complement the twin sensors on the rear bumper.

With the 2019 Proton Saga MC1, the Standard variant gained ABS, EBD and BA, and the front disc rotors are 1 inch larger in diameter. However, front parking sensors which were offered as a standard feature previously, have been omitted and are only available on the Premium variant. For the 2022 Proton Saga MC2, the VDC package which includes ESC, TCS and HHA became standard fitment for all AT variants. A Standard Lite AT variant without the VDC package was briefly introduced by Proton on 26 August 2022, which slots between the Standard MT and Standard AT. The Standard Lite AT variant has been quietly discontinued since 2024.

=== Passive ===
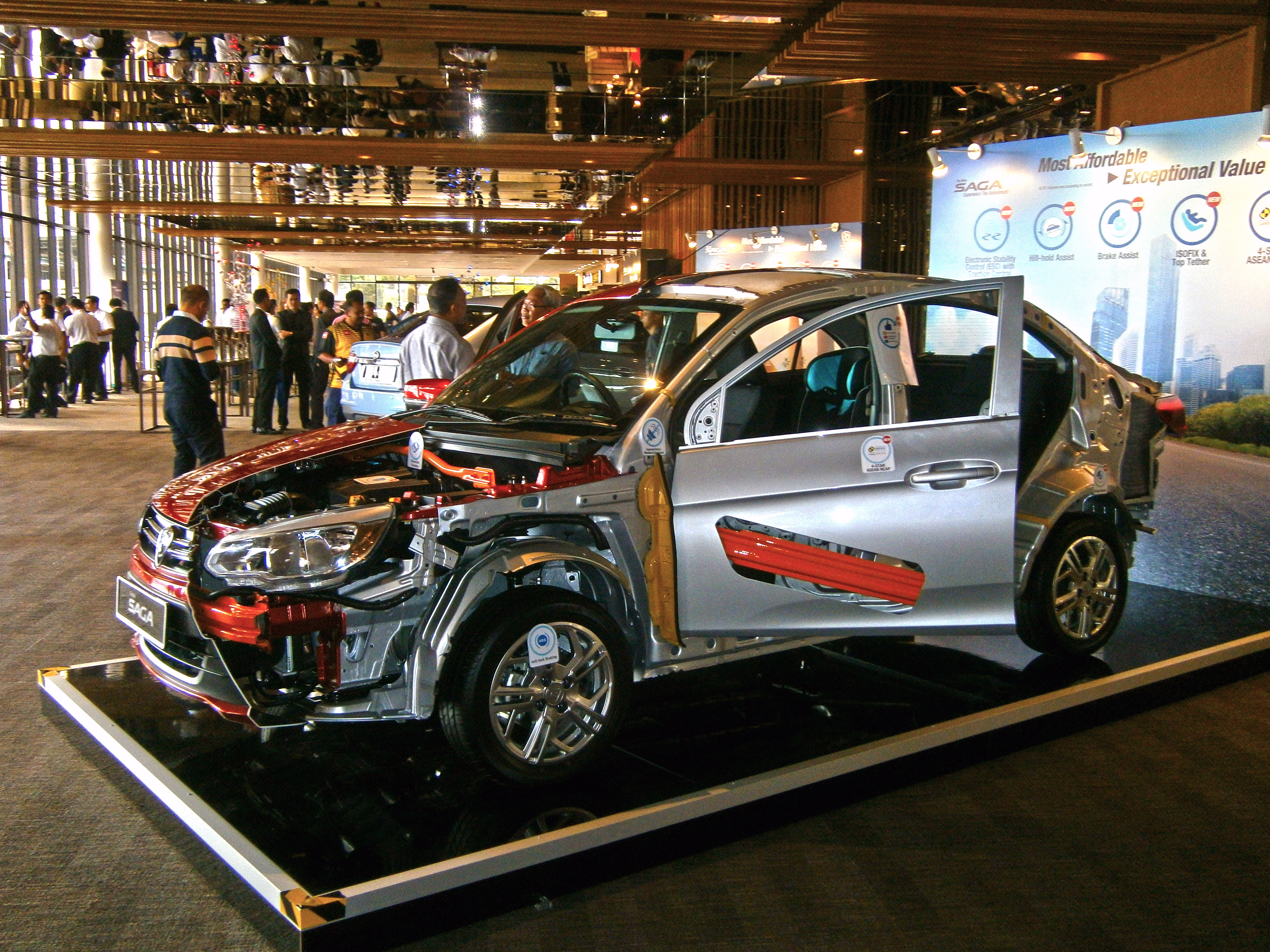
The body structure of the third generation Saga is 20% stronger compared to the previous model.

The third generation Saga features a stronger body structure than its second generation predecessors. Torsional rigidity has been increased to 12,000 Nm/deg from 10,000 Nm/deg previously. The new Saga is fitted with a number of ultra high strength steel (UHSS) components at critical sections throughout its body structure to reinforce and protect the passenger compartment in the event of a collision. The front and rear crumple zones have both increased courtesy of longer front and rear overhangs. However, Proton's new hot press forming (HPF) technology and the Reinforced Safety Structure are not offered in the third generation Saga.

In addition to the UHSS reinforced body structure, Proton has also equipped twin front airbags for all variants of the new Saga. Other passive safety features include two ISOFIX child seat mounts with top tethers, head restraints and five three-point seat belts, with pre-tensioning for front passengers and an audible driver's seat belt reminder.

ASEAN NCAP has awarded a 4-star rating for all variants of the new Saga. It is a marked improvement from the previous 3-star rating in the outgoing Saga SV, which was tested in January 2013. The third generation Saga received 13.33 points out of the maximum 16 for Adult Occupant Protection (AOP), and a 71% compliance rating in the Child Occupant Protection category (COP). In comparison, the old Saga SV model scored 10.23 AOP points and 48% COP compliance respectively. The new Saga's rating fell short of the full 5-stars by a slim 0.67 AOP points, but ASEAN NCAP has nonetheless commended Proton for their efforts on re-engineering their ageing Saga platform to meet more stringent safety standards.

== Powertrain ==
Manufacturer's claims
Engine	1.3 L VVT S4PE		
Format	I4 16V DOHC NA VVT		
Total displacement (cc)	1,332		
Bore x Stroke (mm x mm)	76.0 x 73.4		
Maximum Output [hp(kW)/rpm]	94 (70) / 5,750		
Maximum Torque (Nm/rpm)	120 / 4,000		
Fuel tank capacity (litres)	40		
Transmission	5MT	CVT	4AT
Maximum Speed (km/h)	200	190	190
Acceleration 0–100 km/h (sec)	12.2	13.1	?

The third generation Saga is powered by Proton's 1.3-litre VVT S4PE engine, a naturally aspirated, four-cylinder, 16-valve DOHC petrol unit with variable valve timing. The 1.3-litre VVT, the sole option in the new Saga, is capable of 94 hp at 5,750 rpm and 120 Nm at 4,000 rpm. The new VVT engine is derived from the Proton Iriz, and replaces the old CamPro IAFM+ engine which powered the Saga FLX family.

Although the new VVT engine outputs the same amount of power as the IAFM+ unit previously, it features a number of mechanical enhancements for reduced noise, vibration and harshness (NVH) and improved fuel efficiency. In comparison to the old IAFM+, the new VVT engine has a new block, new pistons, new valves and a longer 10,000 km service interval. It also features variable valve timing in the cylinder head, making the third generation Saga the first in its lineage to offer VVT technology. The engine sits on a new three-mount configuration, as opposed to the four-mount arrangement in the outgoing Saga models as well as the Iriz. The improved mounting configuration has considerably reduced transmissions of engine vibrations into the cabin. Proton has also fitted a new strut bar in the engine bay, for improved driving dynamics. The ECU has also been calibrated for a more linear throttle response.

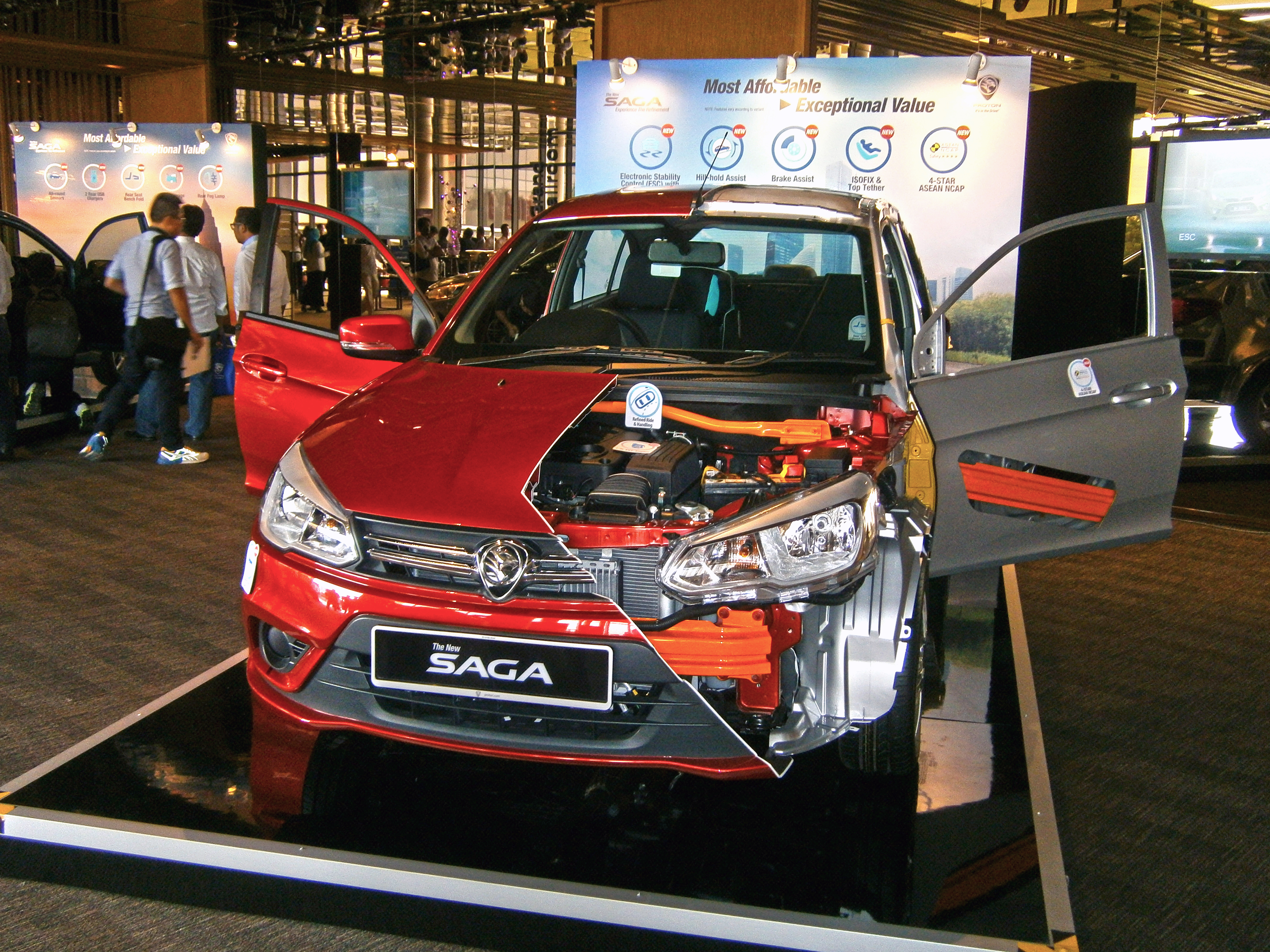
All variants are powered by Proton's 94 hp, 1.3-litre VVT engine.

Like the Saga FLX family previously, the third generation Saga is paired to either a Getrag 5-speed manual or a Punch Powertrain VT2+ CVT. However, Proton has enhanced the Punch CVT for a smoother drive, and in its latest iteration is claimed to be considerably more refined and responsive than the older CVT units in the Iriz and Saga FLX. Acceleration has also improved, with the manual and CVT variants taking 12.2 and 13.1 seconds to reach 100 km/h from a standstill, both 0.8 and 1.4 seconds faster than the old Saga FLX.

As a result of the various refinements made to the engine and transmission combination in the new Saga, Proton claims that fuel efficiency has improved by 10% to 5.4L/100 km with the manual, and by 11% to 5.6L/100 km with the CVT, both at a constant speed of 90 km/h. The new Saga is the second Proton model to utilise the company's new ECO Drive Assist feature. The system assesses the driver's throttle input, and a green indicator on the instrument cluster will light up when the car is being driven in an economical manner.

The new Saga will not be offered with a larger 1.6-litre engine. The decision was made in view of Proton's revised marketing strategy which aims to prevent product overlapping and sales cannibalisation. The new Saga will only be sold with the 1.3-litre engine, and future Saga models will receive economy 1.0-litre and 1.2-litre engines instead.

With the launch of 2019 Proton Saga MC1, the 1.3-litre engine still remains except it is paired to either to a Getrag 5-speed manual as before or a Hyundai 4-speed automatic. It is worth to note that Geely who has a 49% stake in Proton Holdings also uses this same transmission in some of their vehicles. The L or low mode with the CVT is no more. A S or sport mode exists with the automatic.

During the launch of 2022 Saga MC2 and from its detail information, the 2022 Saga's engine remains its capacity similar with its previous domestic counterpart, unlike 2019 Saga export counterparts and as speculated before.

In June 2023, the Hyundai-sourced 4-speed automatic was swapped for an Aisin 4-speed automatic.

== Awards and accolades ==
- Rising Star Award Car - Asean NCAP Grand Prix Award 2016
- Value-For-Money Car - Malaysia Car of the Year 2016
- Compact Sedan of the Year - DSF.my Allianz Vehicle of the Year (VOTY) 2017)
- Best 3 City Cars of Malaysia‍‍‍ - Aurizn Awards 2018 'Cars of Malaysia'
- Budget Car (Bronze Winner) - Carlist.my People's Choice Awards 2018
