= Proton Saga (fourth generation) =

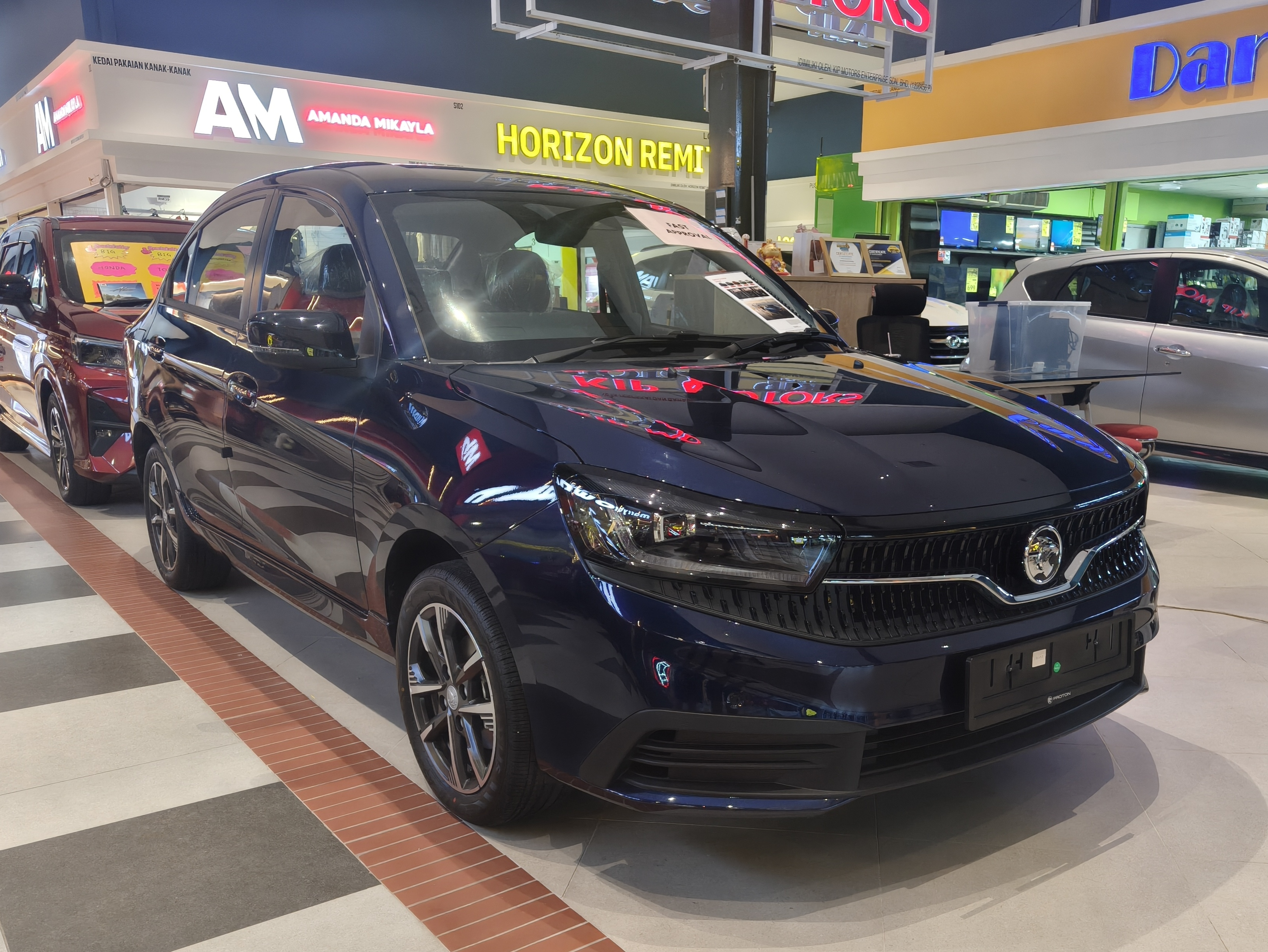
- 2026 Proton Saga 1.5 Premium CVT

Overview
- Manufacturer: Proton
- Model code: P2-14A
- Also called: Proton Saga MC3
- Production: November 2025 - present
- Assembly: Malaysia: Proton City (PTMSB, 2025-present)

Body and chassis
- Class: City car (A)
- Body style: 4-door sedan
- Platform: Advanced Modular Architecture (AMA)

Powertrain
- Engine: 1.5L BHE15PFI 4-cylinder
- Transmission: Aisin 4-speed automatic Punch Powertrain CVT

Dimensions
- Wheelbase: 2,465 mm (97.0 in)
- Length: 4,390 mm (172.8 in)
- Width: 1,690 mm (66.5 in)
- Height: 1,525 mm (60.0 in)
- Curb weight: 1,055 kg (2,325.9 lb) – 1,085 kg (2,392.0 lb)

Chronology
- Predecessor: Proton Saga (third generation)

The fourth generation Proton Saga (MC3), codenamed P2-14A, is an A-segment four door saloon engineered by Malaysian automotive manufacturer Proton. It was launched on 27 November 2025 as the successor to the third generation Proton Saga.

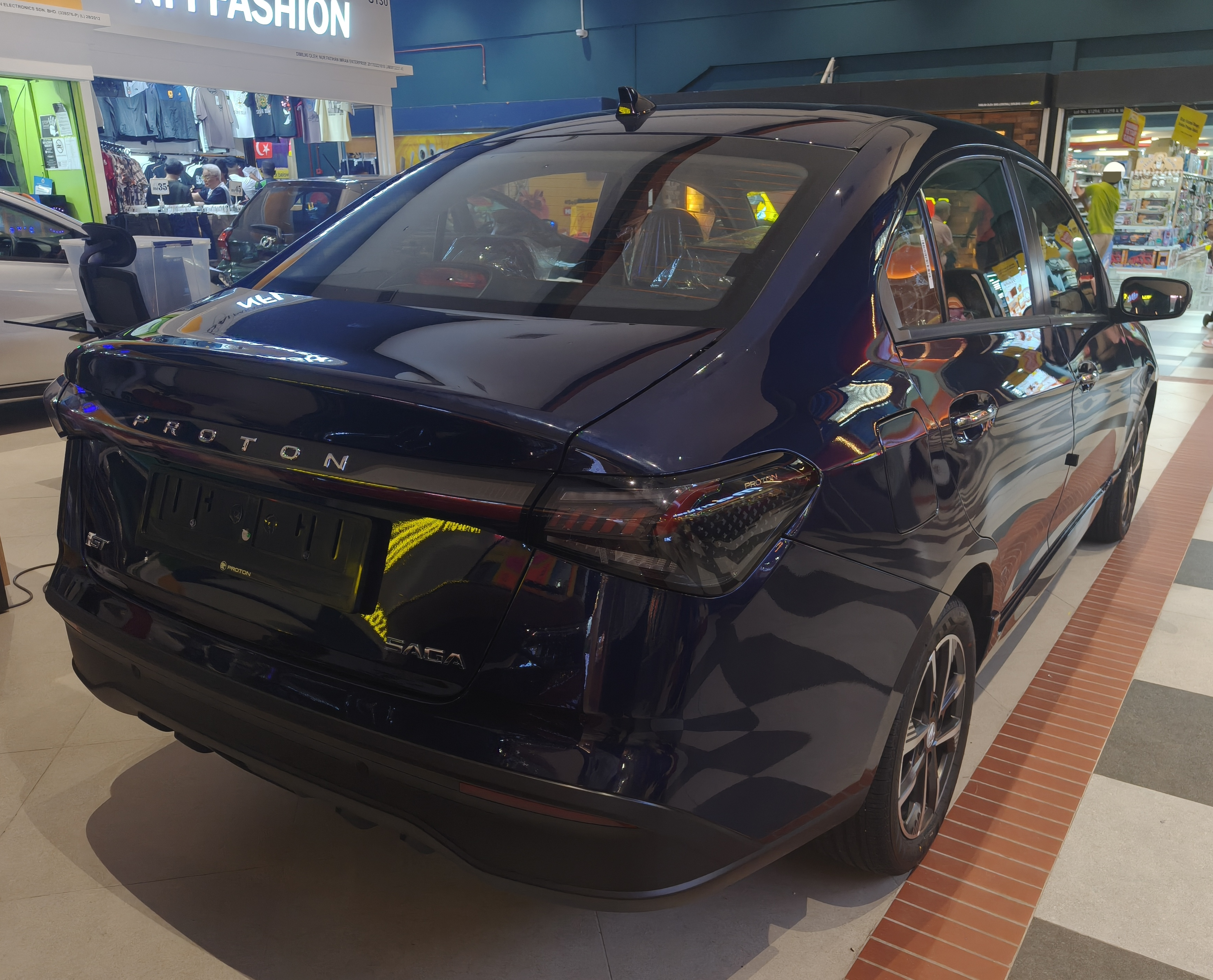
Rear view

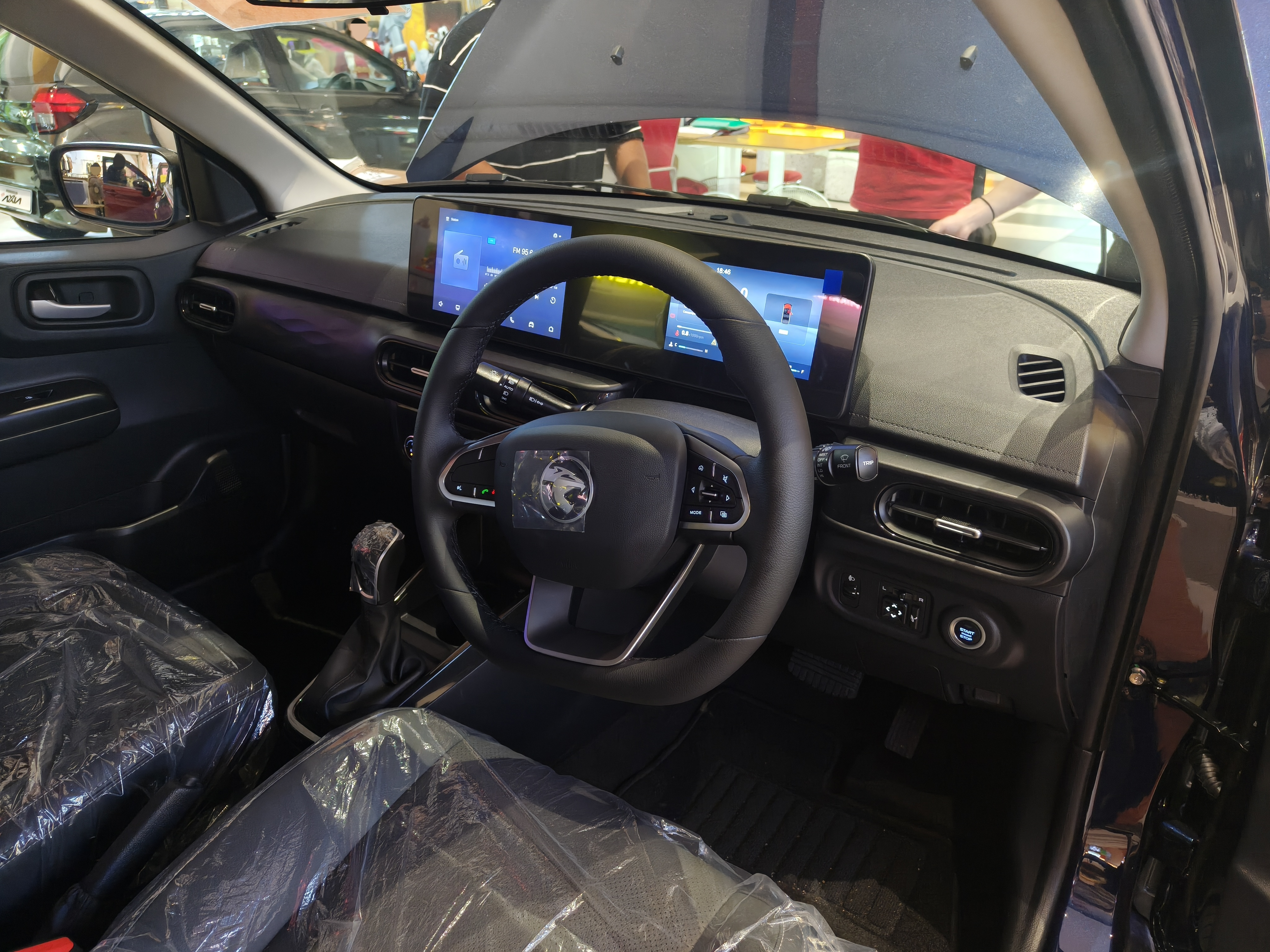
Interior

It is the first model to be used in Advanced Modular Architecture (AMA) platform. The fourth generation Proton Saga was offered in three variants: Standard, Executive and Premium. For engines, all variants were powered by new BHE15PFI 1.5-litre petrol engine, with the Standard and Executive are paired with the Aisin-sourced 4-speed automatic while the Premium variant paired with the Punch Powertrain CVT.

== History ==
The fourth generation Proton Saga was revealed during the 47th ASEAN Summits on 28 October 2025. It made its public debut at ACE 2025 at Setia Convention Centre in Shah Alam from 8 to 9 November 2025 while the officially launching was on 27 November 2025.

In December 2025, it was reported that the Saga will be sold throughout the Philippines as a Geely-based vehicle.

== Design ==
The fourth generation Saga features a heavily revised Advanced Modular Architecture (AMA) platform. It sports a bolder exterior with a Sulaman Songket-inspired front grille, LED projector headlamps with L-shaped DRLs, an Ethereal Bow chrome bar, and full-width LED rear taillights. The modern cabin introduces a widescreen dual-screen panel and a flat-bottom steering wheel.

== Safety ==
ASEAN NCAP test results Proton Saga (2025)
Test	Points
Overall:	4 /5 stars
Adult occupant:	29.65
Child occupant:	14.97
Safety assist:	13.33
Motorcyclist Safety:	8.75

== Specifications ==
Technical specifications
Engine	1.5L DOHC i-GT PFI		
Format	I4 16V DOHC DVVT		
Total displacement (cc)	1, 499		
Bore x Stroke (mm x mm)	76.0 x 73.4		
Maximum Output [hp(kW)/rpm]	88 (120) / 6100		
Maximum Torque (Nm/rpm)	150 / 4, 000		
Fuel tank capacity (litres)	40		
Dimension & Weight	1.5 Standard	1.5 Executive	1.5 Premium
Length (mm)	4390		
Width (mm)	1690		
Height (mm)	1525		
Wheelbase (mm)	2465		
Kerb Weight (mm)	1055	1065	1085

== Awards and Accolades ==
- 4-star ASEAN NCAP safety rating under outgoing 2021 - 2025 test protocol
