= Decrepit car =

Run down automobile

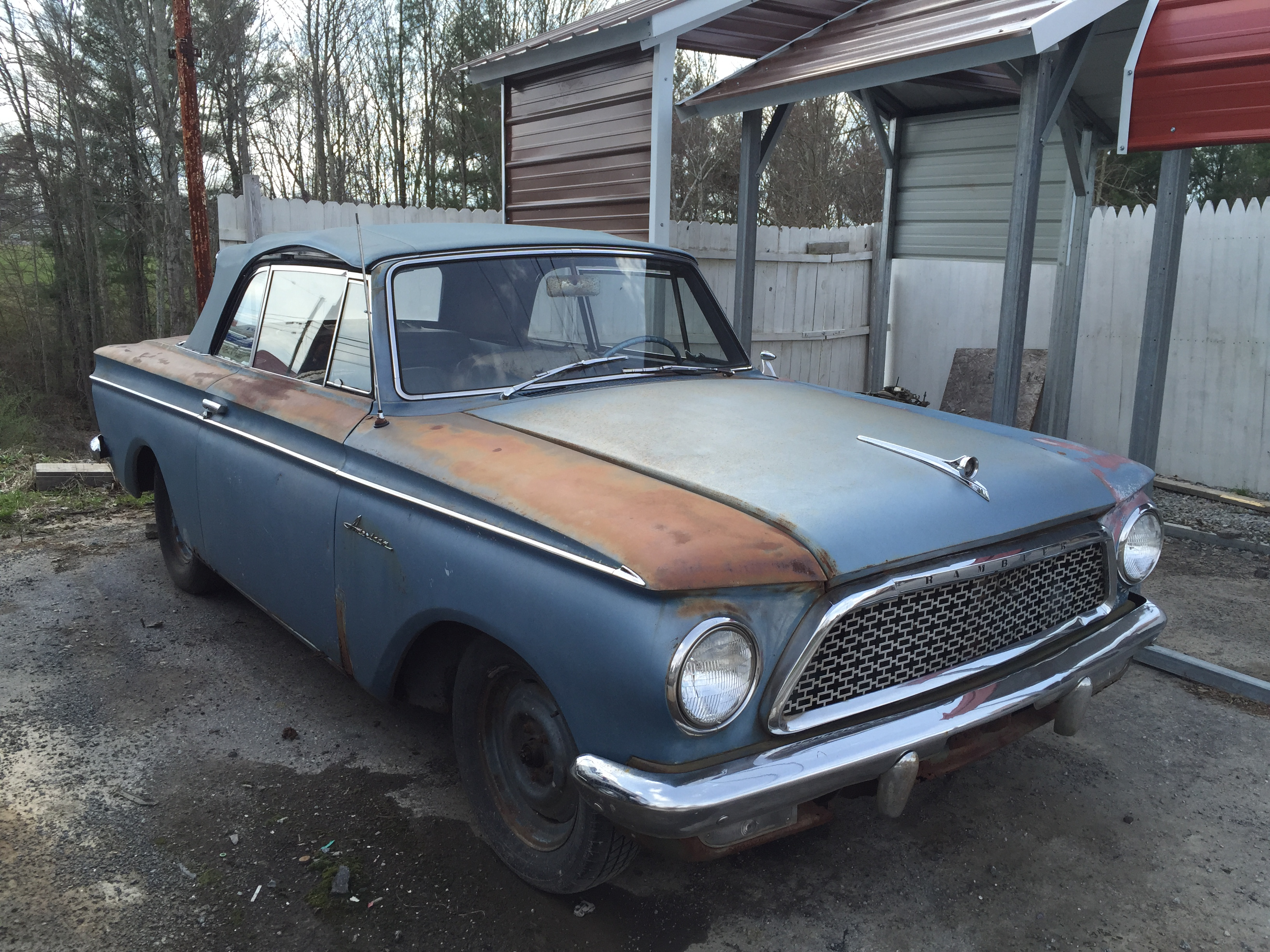
A 1961 American Rambler in disrepair

A decrepit car is an automobile that is often old and damaged and is in a barely functional state. There are many slang terms used to describe such cars, such as beater, bomb, clunker, chod, flivver, hooptie/hoopty, jalopy, lemon, old banger (most commonly used in the UK), shitbox, or junk car.

Age, neglect, and damage tend to increase the expense of maintaining a vehicle. The vehicle may reach a point where this expense would be considered to outweigh the value of keeping it. Such vehicles are generally stripped for parts or abandoned. However, abandoning a vehicle on the road as a parked car is illegal in many jurisdictions and if a vehicle remains parked, the local authority commonly tows it to the scrapyard. Some owners choose to keep the vehicle. These old, neglected, and oftentimes barely functional cars have been used not only for transport, but also as racing vehicles and mobile homes. Their use has earned them a place in popular culture.

== History ==
During the 1930s, the Great Depression left many Americans struggling financially, making new vehicles unattainable for most. In response, the market for used cars grew rapidly, with decrepit vehicles becoming a popular choice for those on a budget. Cheap dealers would often acquire these cars for very little money, make cosmetic adjustments, and sell them for a higher price, profiting from the demand for affordable transportation. The popularity of these cars extended beyond simple transportation, with early hot rodders using them as a base for building racers. In fact, the emergence of stock car racing can be traced back to these early days, when banger racing and jalopy racing were popular terms in the UK and US, respectively.

A jalopy was an old-style class of stock car racing in America, often raced on dirt ovals. It was originally a beginner class behind midgets, but vehicles became more expensive with time. Jalopy races began in the 1930s and ended in the 1960s. The race car needed to be from before around 1941. Notable racers include Parnelli Jones. In the 1960s, the Ministry Of Transport Test (MOT) was introduced, in an effort to increase road safety. Many decrepit cars that were missing important parts, such as functioning brakes and lights, failed the MOT and were scrapped, ending the age of the decrepit car in England.

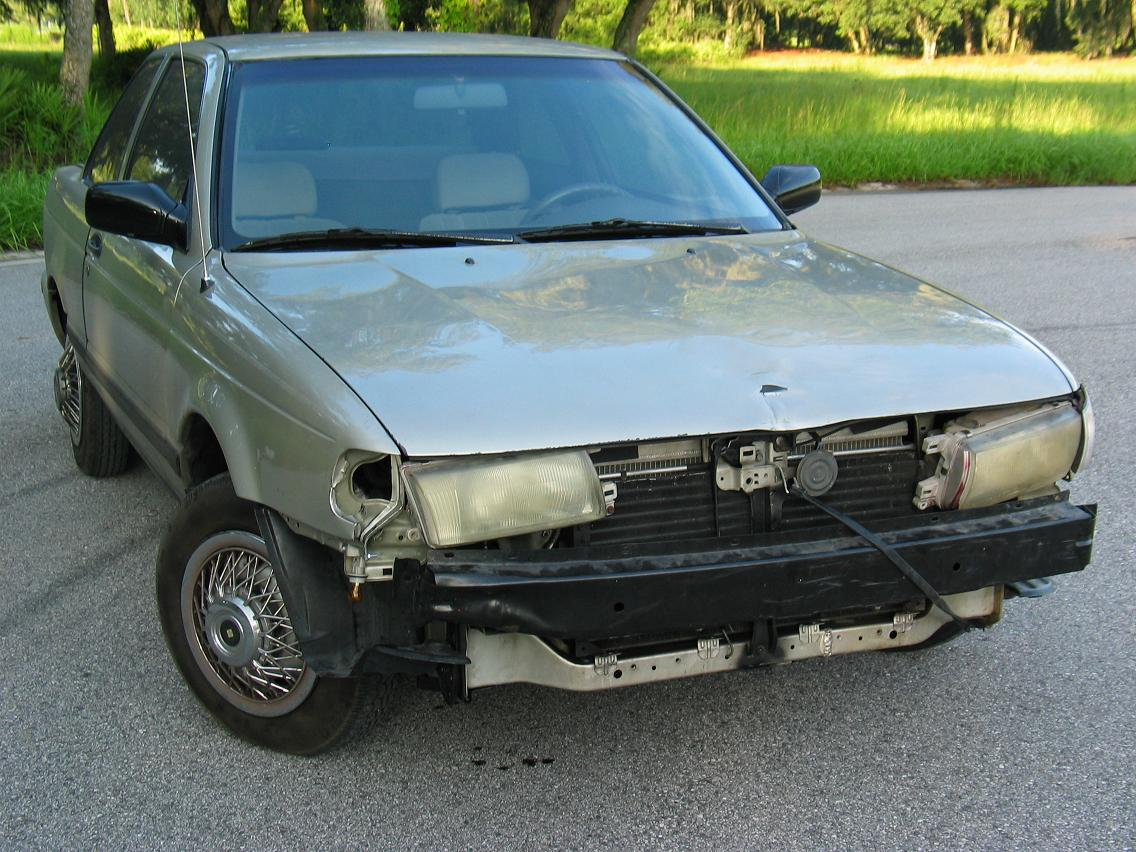
A decrepit Nissan Sentra

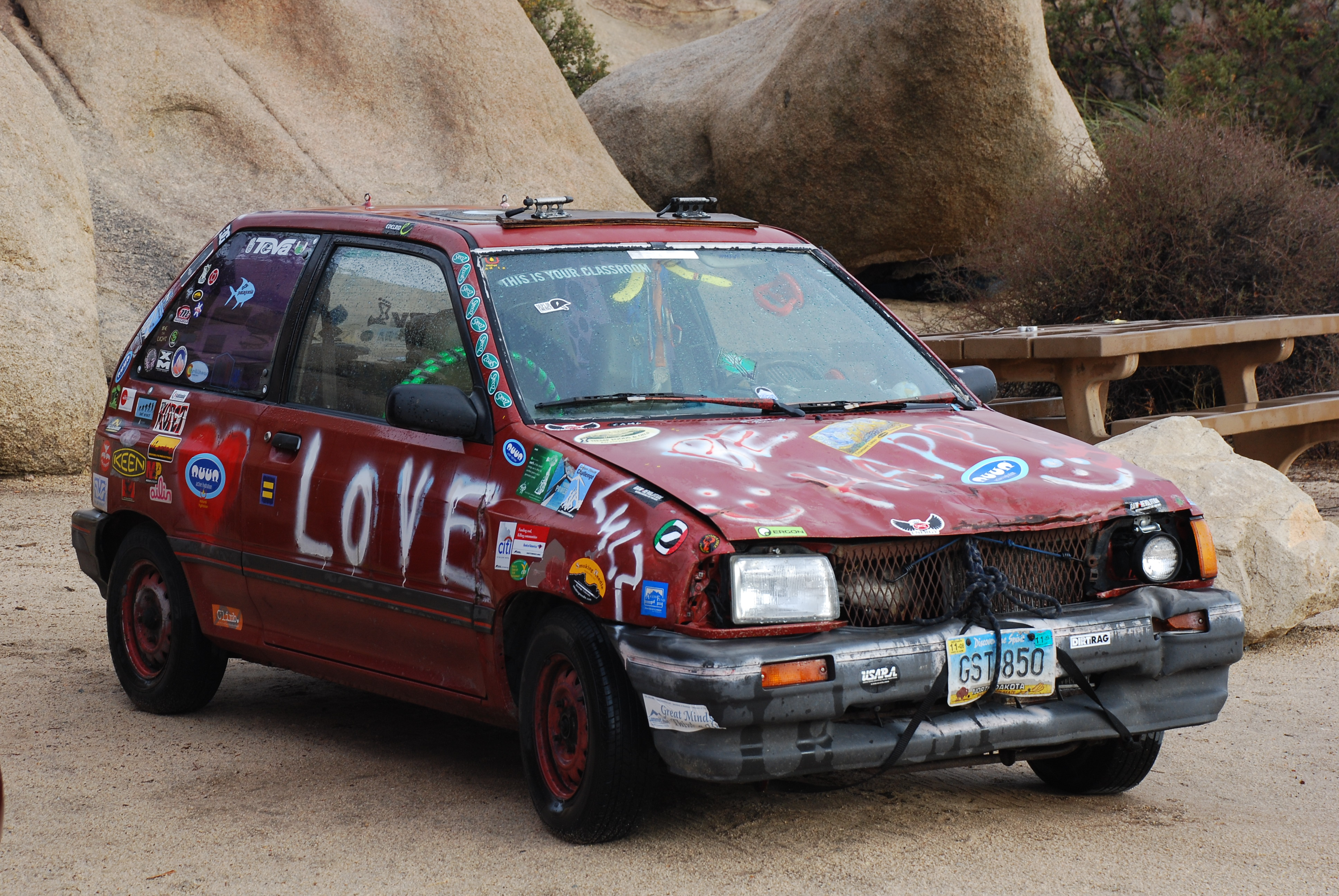
Ford Festiva Jalopy car in Joshua Tree National Park in Hidden Valley Campground. A "derby car" is a typical term for a decrepit car used for racing, often spray painted or decorated in various ways.

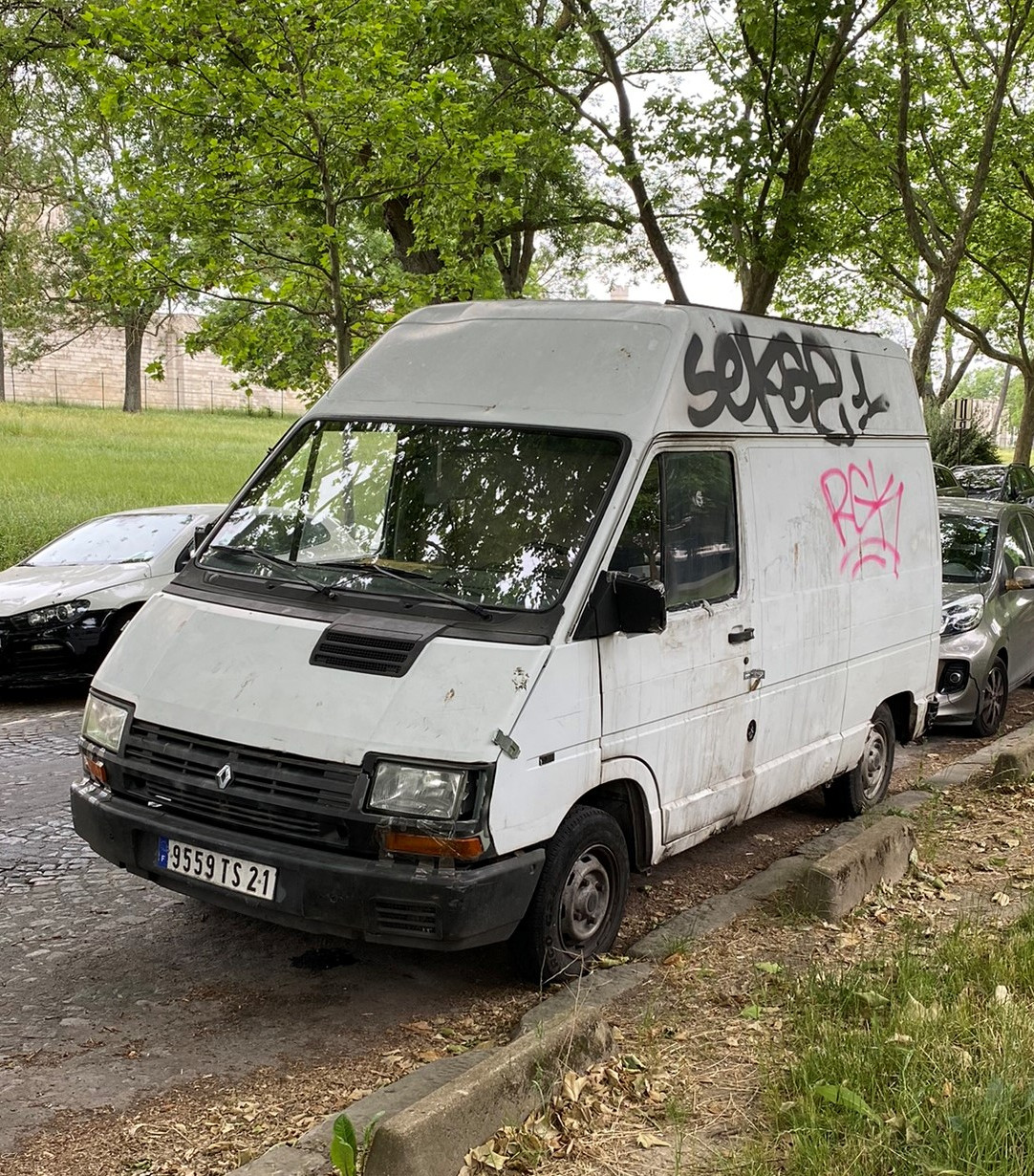
An old Renault Trafic van with various makeshift repairs

== Terminology ==
Numerous slang terms are used to describe such cars, which vary by country and region, including hooptie/hoopty, jalopy, shed, clunker, lemon, banger, bomb, beater, bunky, flivver, old bomb, bucket, rust bucket, bucket of bolts, voodoo, wreck, heap, paddock basher, paddock bomb, death trap, disaster on wheels, rattletrap, or shitbox.

=== Australian English ===
In Australian slang, the terms rust bucket, bunky, old bomb, paddock basher or bomb are used to refer to old, rusty and/or rundown cars. The term 'paddock bomb' or 'paddock basher' often refers specifically to a car no longer fit to drive on public roads, but driven on private property for recreation or sport. Many rural children learn to drive in an unregulated way in a paddock bomb.

The term shitbox may refer to an unprepossessing but probably roadworthy vehicle, celebrated in the biannual (autumn and spring) Shitbox Rally, an Australian fundraiser for cancer charities.

Ingenious means by which desert people keep clapped-out vehicles running was celebrated in the 2001 ABC television series Bush Mechanics.

=== British English ===
In British slang, the terms rust bucket or simply bucket, and shed are used to refer to decrepit cars but the favoured term is old banger, often shortened to banger. The origin refers to the older poorly maintained vehicles' tendency to back-fire..

=== North American English ===
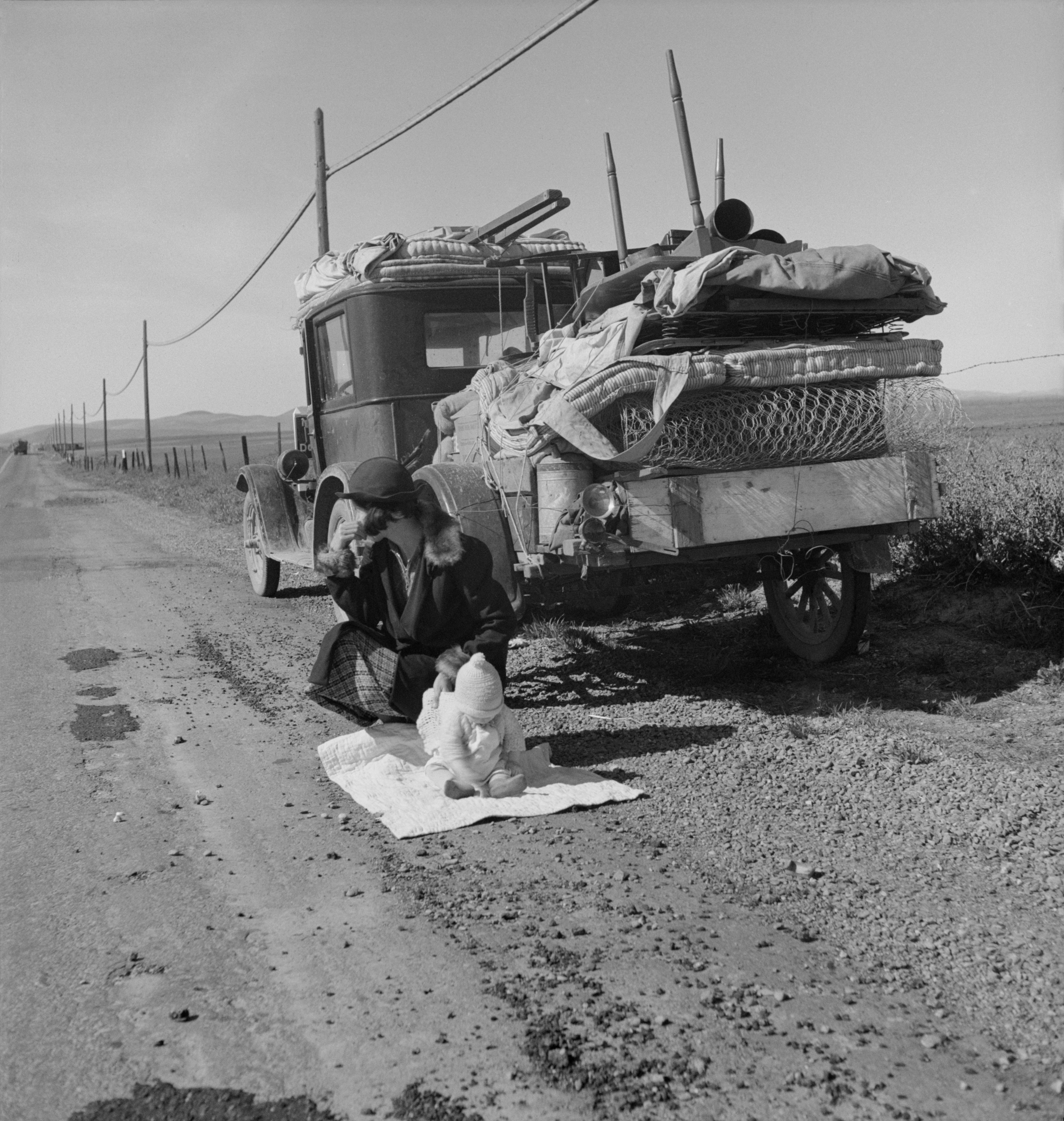
A Missouri family of five who are seven months from the drought area on U.S. Highway 99 (Tracy vicinity) with a jalopy car during the Great Depression

In North American slang, jalopy, clunker, heap, junker, rust bucket, bucket of bolts, and simply bucket are also used. So too are beater—a term especially favored in Canada—and the American urban hooptie, which gained some popularity from the humorous song "My Hooptie" by Sir Mix-a-Lot.

The word jalopy was once common but is now somewhat archaic. Jalopy seems to have replaced flivver, which in the early decades of the 20th century also simply meant "a failure," and is still often used to refer to a Ford Model T. Other early terms for a wreck of a car included heap, tin lizzy (1915) and crate (1927), which probably derived from the WWI pilots' slang for an old, slow and unreliable aeroplane. In the latter half of the 20th century coarser terms became popular, such as shitbox.

The origin of jalopy is unknown, but the earliest written use that has been found was in 1924. It is possible that the longshoremen in New Orleans referred to the scrapped autos destined for scrapyards in Jalapa, Mexico, according to this destination, in which they pronounced the letter J as in English. Another possible origin is the French "chaloupe," motorboat, perhaps imitating the sound an old car would make.

A 1929, definition of jalopy reads as follows: "a cheap make of automobile; an automobile fit only for junking". The definition has stayed the same, but it took a while for the spelling to standardize. Among the variants have been jallopy, jaloppy, jollopy, jaloopy, jalupie, julappi, jalapa and jaloppie. John Steinbeck spelled it gillopy in In Dubious Battle (1936). The term was used extensively in the book On the Road by Jack Kerouac, first published in 1957, although written from 1947.

The Georgia Institute of Technology, an engineering school in Atlanta, takes pride in the practice of engineering students maintaining antique cars, and the school maintains the Ramblin' Wreck, a popular mascot of the school. Their college radio station, WREK, is also named after the iconic car.

The term was also used throughout the history of Archie Comics, specifically referring to Archie Andrews' red, open-top antique car "Ol' Betsy".

In 2009, the term clunker was heavily used in reference to the Car Allowance Rebate System in the United States, which was also known as the "Cash for Clunkers Program".

Decrepit cars used on Indian reservations in the United States and Indian reserves in Canada are often referred to by their owners as reservation cars or rez runners for short. The culture of the rez car was explored in the documentary film Reel Injun, and also figured briefly in the feature film Smoke Signals. Keith Secola (Ojibwa) recorded the song "NDN KARS" describing such a vehicle in 1987. Originally appearing as a cassette release, it was used in the Native critically acclaimed film Dance Me Outside. It is on his album Circle (AKINA Records, 1992). Activist Russell Means's humorous poem "Indian Cars Go Far" (1993) also describes the "Indian car" as a decrepit vehicle.

== See also ==
- 24 Hours of Lemons
- Art car
- Barn find
- Bush Mechanics
- Cash for Clunkers
- Demolition derby
- Depreciation
- Lemon (automobile)
- Milo tin, a Malaysian pejorative term referring to poorly-repaired cars or those of shoddy workmanship.
- My Summer Car
- Petoskey Motor Speedway
- Pimp My Ride
- Vehicle scrappage scheme (United Kingdom)
- Wrecking yard
