= Milo dinosaur =

Malaysian-Singaporean drink beverage

Milo dinosaur, Milo shake
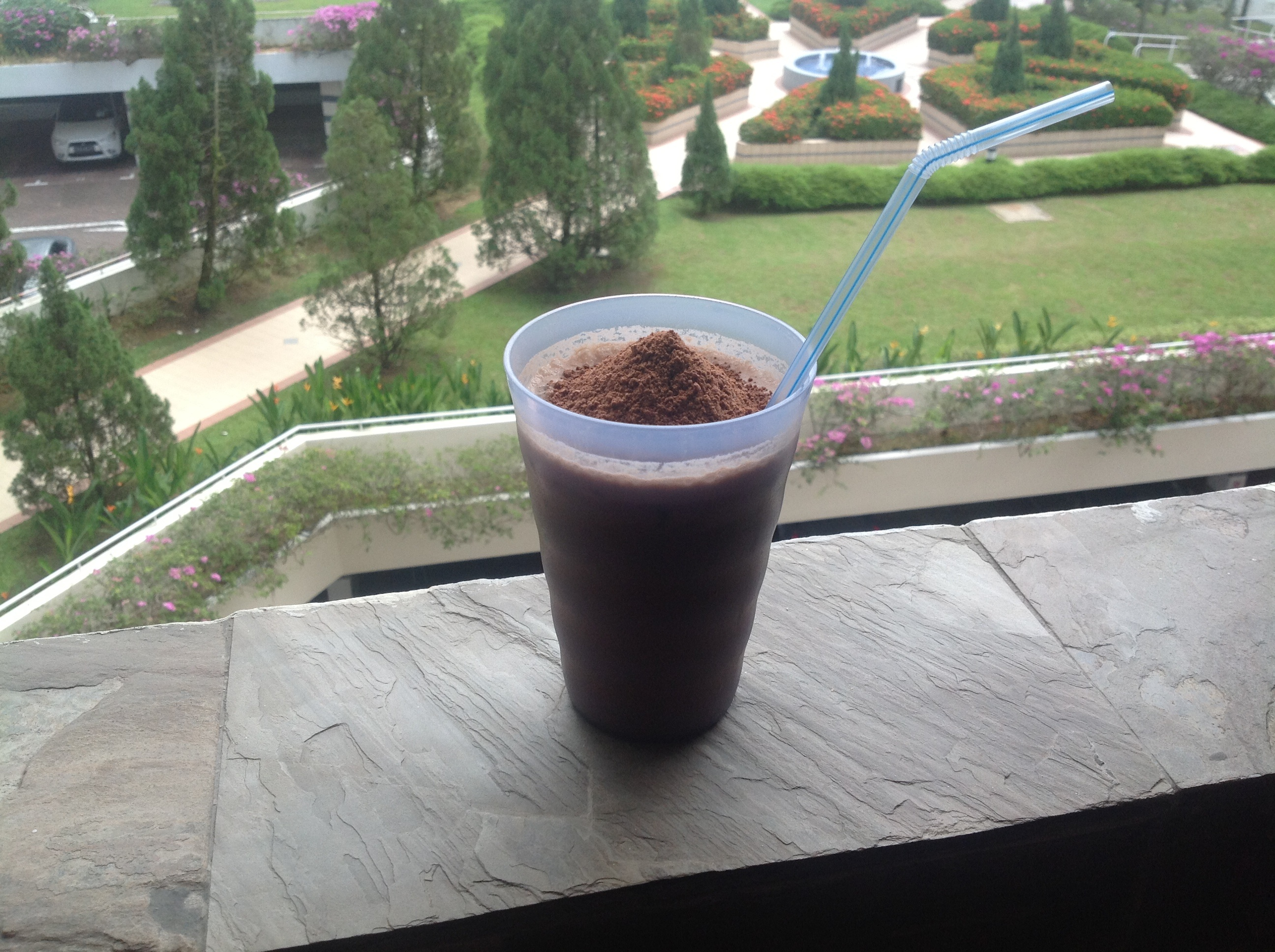
- Type: Cold chocolate beverage
- Flavour: Sweet chocolate beverage
- Ingredients: Milo; Milo powder (undissolved); Ice

Milo dinosaur or Milo tabur is a Malaysian/Singaporean beverage, composed of a cup of iced Milo (a chocolate malt beverage) with undissolved Milo powder added on top of it.

== Etymology ==
According to a reporter for The New Paper, the "dinosaur" in the beverage's name on its own means "[a] heap of Milo or Horlicks powder on the iced drink".

In Thailand, drinks with such preparation are titled with a suffix of phukhao fai (Thai: ภูเขาไฟ, lit. 'volcano'), such as Milo phukhao fai and Ovaltine phukhao fai.

== History and preparation ==
The origin of Milo dinosaur is disputed. A drink, known as Milo shake, was being served in Malaysian roadside stalls in the mid-1990s. Vendors in Singapore say that the Malaysian shake is not as chocolatey and creamy as the Milo dinosaur. Initially, Milo was marketed in British Malaya from the mid-1930s as a convenient ‘fortified tonic food’ for middle-class individuals. At present, Malaysia has the world's highest per capita consumption of Milo. Malaysia is also home to the world's biggest Milo factory. Milo Dinosaur is considered Malaysia's and Singapore's joint colonial legacy.

Milo Dinosaur is also known as "ta-chiu", The drink is made by adding a generous amount of undissolved Milo powder to a cup of iced Milo. The amount of powder added can be excessive or as little as a spoonful. The drink is common in Malaysia and Singapore.

A variant, "Milo Godzilla", comprises a cup of milo dinosaur augmented with a scoop of ice-cream and/or whipped cream.

== Cultural impact ==
In Hong Kong, Milo Dinosaur is often served as a Malaysian speciality while in Australia, the land where Milo originated from, it is simply the way cold Milo is prepared.

Typically sold at Mamak stalls, Milo dinosaur can be accompanied with roti canai. The beverage is considered to be inexpensive in Singapore; As of 2013, its pricing ranges from S$3 to S$3.50. The name of the beverage is one of the terms to be guessed in the Singaporean version of the popular board game, Taboo. Milo Dinosaur inspired the creation of "Godzilla Milo", a cupcake sold at a Singapore-based pastry store. According to one Taiwan-based beverage store offering the drink, it is a "super popular" crowd-pleaser for the younger generation.

Milo Dinosaur is also prominent in Malaysia.
