= Milo (drink) =

Chocolate and malt powder drink produced by Nestlé

MILO

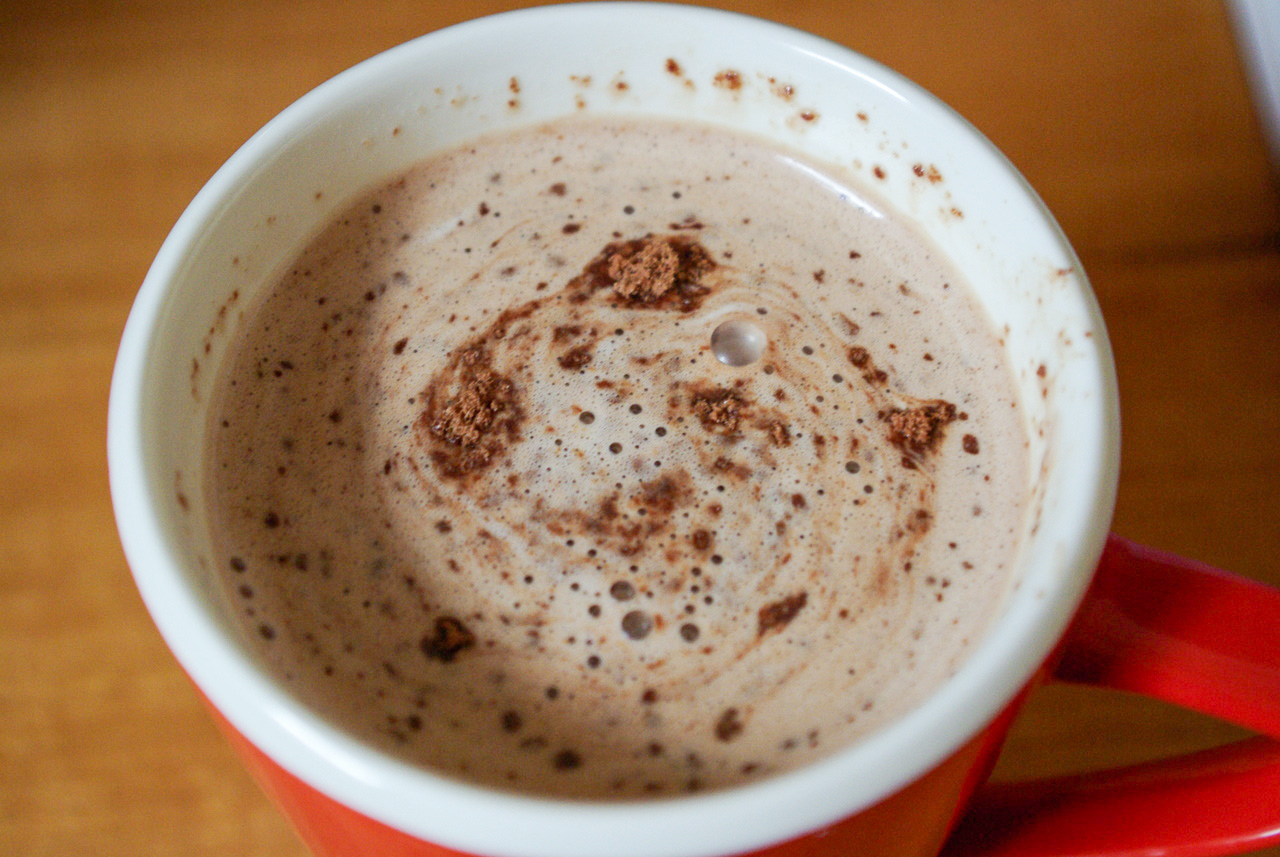
- Hot Milo and milk
- Product type: Chocolate-based products
- Current owner: Nestlé
- Country: Australia
- Introduced: 29 August 1934; 92 years ago
- Markets: Worldwide
- Website: milo.com.au

Milo (/ˈmaɪloʊ/ MY-loh; stylised in all caps as MILO) is an Australian chocolate-flavoured malted powder product produced by Nestlé, typically mixed with milk, hot water, or both, to produce a beverage. It was originally developed in Australia by Thomas Mayne (1901–1995) in 1934.

Most commonly sold as a powder in a green can, often depicting various sporting activities like badminton or football, Milo is available as a premixed beverage in some countries and has been subsequently developed into a chocolate bar, breakfast cereal, and protein granola. Its composition and taste differ from country to country.

Milo maintains significant popularity in a diverse range of countries throughout the world, particularly in Australasia, Asia, Africa, and Latin America.

== History ==
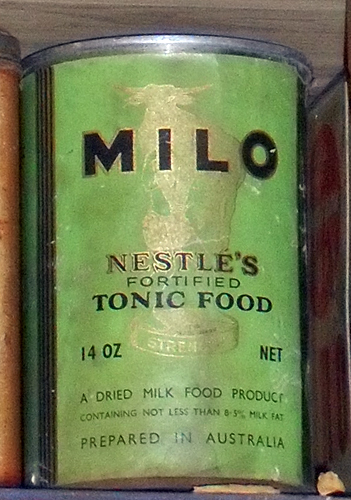
1940s Milo can

In 1934, Australian industrial chemist and inventor Thomas Mayne, who was working at Nestlé, developed "Milo" and launched it at the Sydney Royal Easter Show. Mayne came up with his formula for Milo combining malt extract (made from malted barley), full cream milk powder, cocoa, sugar, mineral salts, iron and vitamins A, D and B1, in an attempt "to develop a completely balanced food drink which contained all the necessary proteins and minerals". It was intended to help children to obtain enough nutrients in their diet.

Nestlé, which had taken ownership of a milk-processing plant in Smithtown, New South Wales, in 1921, started producing the product not long after the show. The name was derived from the famous ancient Greek athlete Milo of Croton, after his legendary strength. The product was even noted as "tonic food".

== Manufacture ==
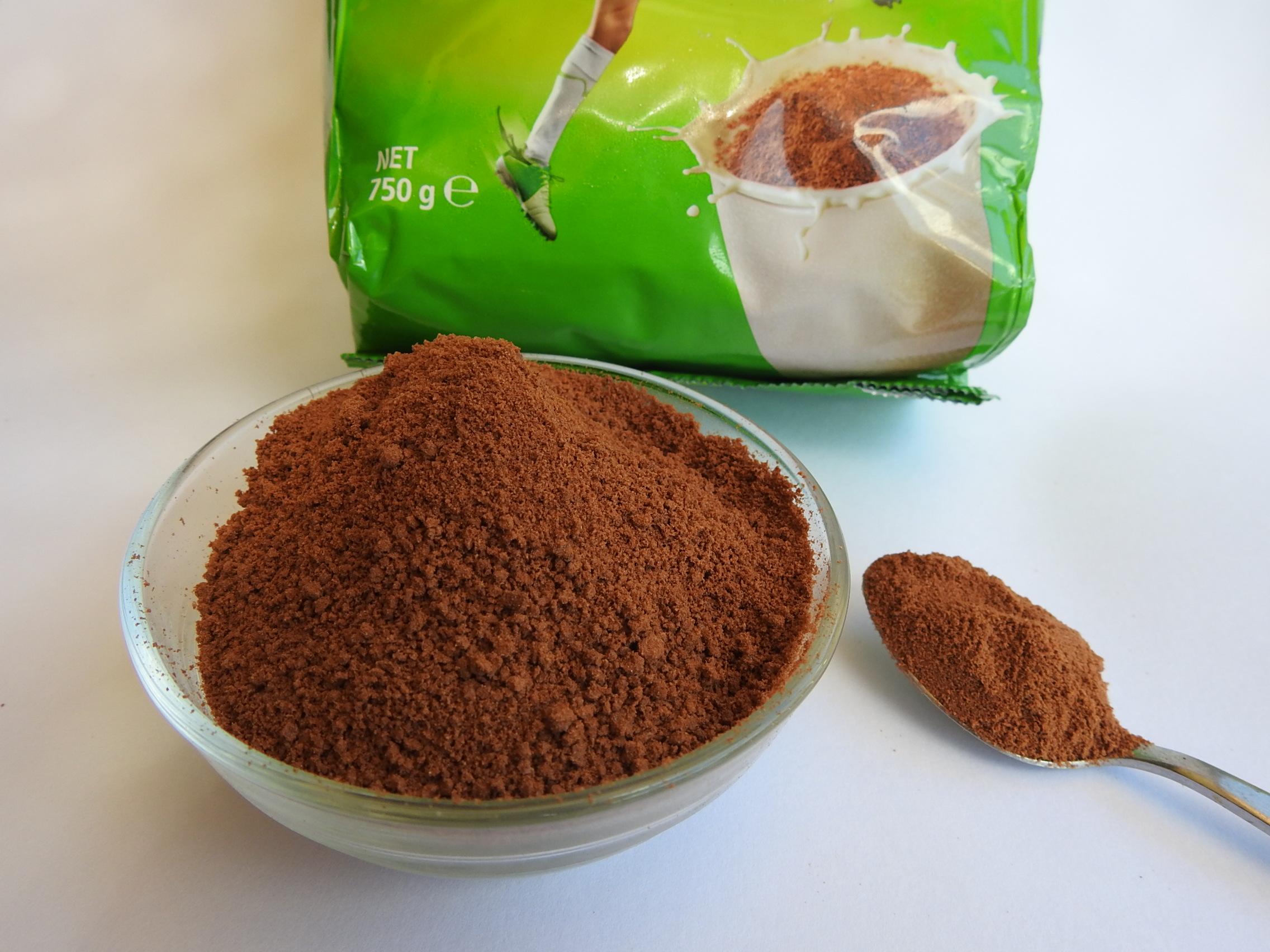
Milo powder (Australian form)

Milo is made by evaporating the water content from a thick syrup at reduced pressure, using a vacuum dryer to reduce the mix to granular form. The thick opaque syrup is obtained from malted wheat or barley sourced from companies that produce these raw products.

Milo's composition and taste differ in some countries due to logistics limitations and personal preferences among different regions.

As of 2021, the Smithtown factory, which produces the product for Australia and New Zealand, produces more than 13,000 tonnes of Milo a year. Nestlé Singapore states that Milo is produced locally at its factory in Jurong. Milo in Japan is manufactured using ingredients imported from Singapore.

== Nutritional information ==
The recipe for the standard product has remained almost exactly the same since its creation in 1934, the only variation being in the added minerals and vitamins.

Standard Milo consists of four main ingredients: malted barley, milk powder, sugar and cocoa. It contains 1,680 kJ (402 kilocalories) in every 100 g of the powder, mostly from carbohydrates. Carbohydrates can be used for energy by the body, which is the basis of Milo being marketed as an energy drink. Most of the carbohydrate content is sugar. The New Zealand version of Milo is 46 percent sugar.

Milo dissolved in water has a glycemic index (GI) of 55. However, milk has a much lower GI of 30 to 33, so mixing a very small amount of Milo into a mug of milk yields an overall GI closer to 33, whereas adding a lot of Milo into a mug of milk, yields an overall GI that is closer to 55.

Milo is high in calcium, iron and the vitamins B_{1}, B_{2}, B_{6}, B_{12}. Milo is advertised as containing "Actigen-E" which is Nestlé's trademarked name for the vitamins in the Milo recipe. It also contains some theobromine, a xanthine alkaloid similar to caffeine, which is present in the cocoa used in the product.

A study conducted in Malaysia by the 'Nutrition Society of Malaysia' suggested that Milo and similar products made children who consumed them "more likely to be physically active and spend less time in front of a computer or television". A 2017 New York Times article found that Nestlé had been financing the society and vetting the articles before publication, leading to questions of scientific impartiality. The high concentration of sugar, and the presence of maltodextrin, also raised whether the product should be marketed as a health product.

== Versions ==
Since 2017, Nestle Philippines has produced Milo using its "protomalt" formulation. The protomalt is composed of carbohydrates derived from barley and cassava.

In Australia, a version of Milo called Milo B-Smart was released in 2008, which had a finer texture, added B vitamins and iodine, and a different taste from the original Milo formula, and was marketed as a health food for children. However, as of 2021, this product is no longer available. A higher malt content form also existed in Australia and was marketed in brown and maroon coloured cans. Nestlé stopped advertising this higher malt form on their Australian products website sometime between March and April 2015.

As of 2021, three other varieties are manufactured at the Australian plant: high protein, reduced sugar and a plant-based version.

As of 2021, Nestlé has launched dairy-free plant-based versions of Milo and other drinks under the brand. The new version of these drinks contain almond and soy milk, the two core ingredients – cocoa and malt – remain the same.

== Consumption ==
Milo is typically mixed with milk, hot water, or both, to produce a beverage.

=== Australia and New Zealand ===
Traditionally in Australia and New Zealand, Milo is served mixed with either hot or cold milk, or sprinkled on top.

=== Latin America ===
Milo is very popular in all Latin American countries, especially in Colombia, where people often think of it as a local product, and it is not only consumed with milk, but also in drinks with fruits, such as bananas and strawberries, even in drinks with oatmeal.

=== Asia ===
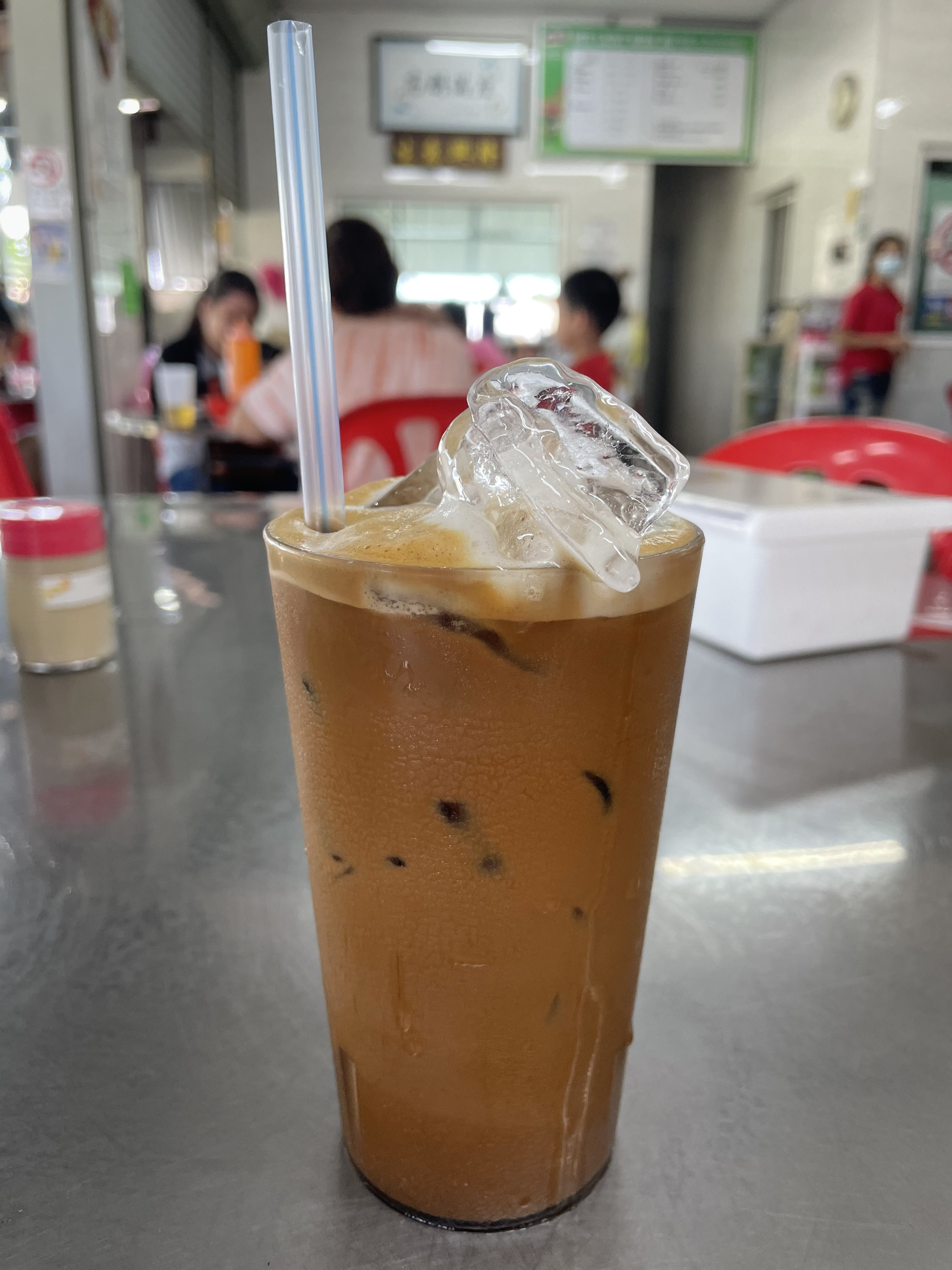
Iced Milo aka "Milo Ais", "Milo Peng", or "Es Milo". A popular drink in Singapore, Malaysia, Indonesia, and South American countries such as Colombia

Milo manufactured outside Australia is customised for local methods of preparation. In Malaysia, as well as Brunei and some other parts of Asia, Milo with ice added is known as "Iced Milo", "Milo Ais" in Malay, or "Es Milo" in Indonesian (alternatively, "bing" or "peng", meaning ice in Cantonese and Hokkien respectively). Iced Milo is even available at fast food restaurants such as KFC and McDonald's in certain countries within southeast Asia.

In Malaysia, Milo is also served locally in kopitiams and mamak stalls in versions such as "Milo Dinosaur" (a cup of Milo with an extra heaped spoonfuls worth of undissolved Milo powder added on top of it), "Milo Godzilla" (a cup of Milo with ice cream and/or topped with whipped cream), "Neslo" (combined with Nescafé powdered coffee), and "Milo Mangkuk" (Iced Milo that is served with shaved ice inside a plastic bowl). The Milo powder is also usually used in the making of Batik cake. In Hong Kong, Milo is served in Cha chaan teng.

In Malaysia, Milo is also sometimes sprinkled on ice cream or breakfast cereals, or mixed with milk into a paste and spread on bread. Milo can be used as an ingredient in roti canai, where it is usually called "roti Milo".

In 2009, Malaysia had the world's highest per capita consumption of Milo, Singapore coming second.

In Malaysia milo's ingredients consist of: Cereal Grains [Wholegrain Wheat (gluten) (35.2%), Wheat Flour (gluten), Corn Semolina], Sugar, Extract of Malt Barley (gluten) and Starch, Fat-Reduced Cocoa Powder, Minerals (Calcium Carbonate, Reduced Iron), Palm Oil, Skimmed Milk Powder (Cow's Milk), Iodized Salt (Sodium Chloride, Potassium Iodate), Emulsifier (Soya Lecithin E322), Natural Flavourings, Antioxidant (Tocopherols), Vitamins (B3, B5, B6, B2, B9).

== Marketing ==
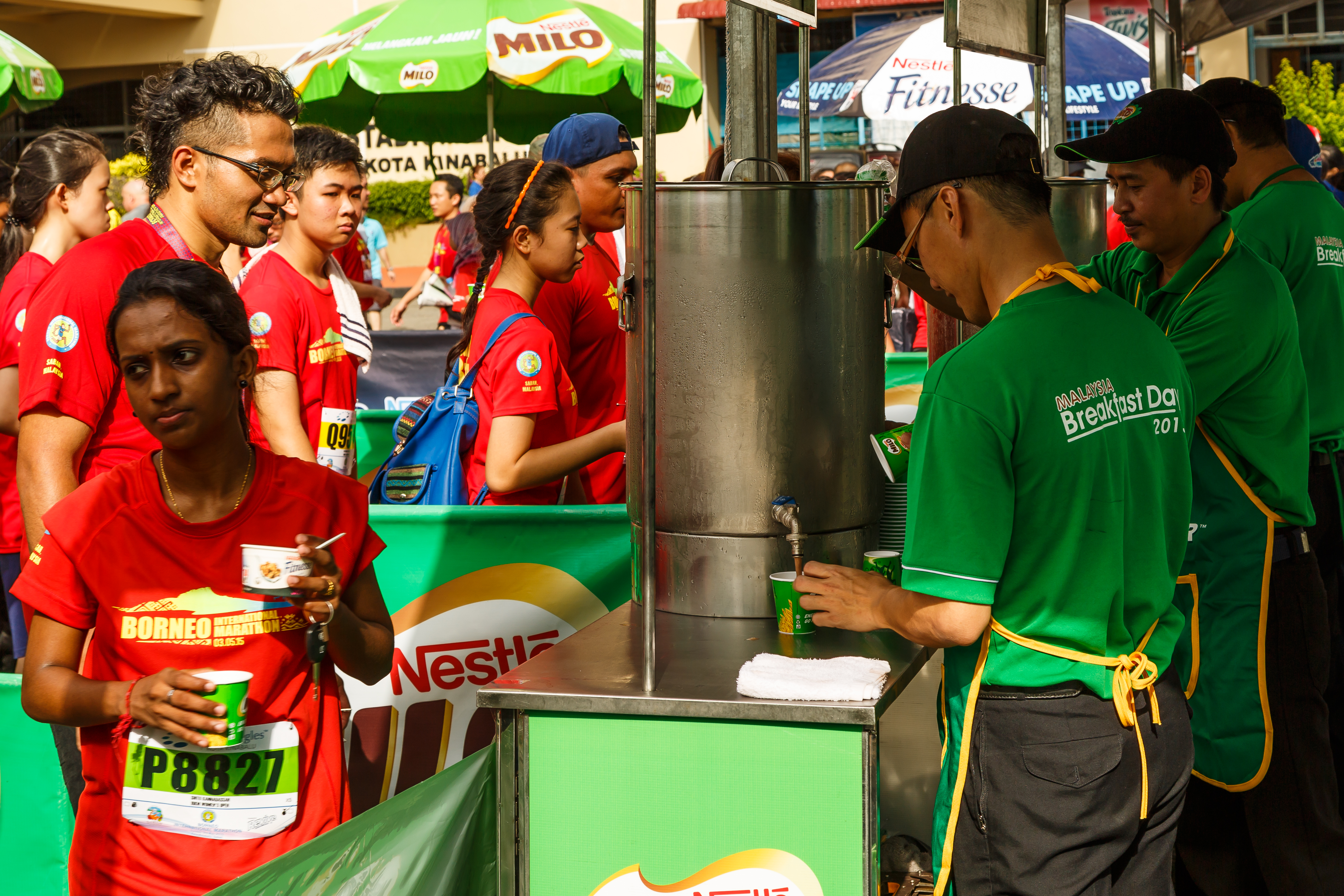
Milo being served at an athletics event

Apart from Australia, Milo is popular in many countries and regions, including New Zealand, Malaysia, Singapore, Brunei, Pakistan, Philippines, Vietnam, India, Indonesia, Hong Kong, Sri Lanka, Maldives, Thailand, Japan, Jamaica, Trinidad and Tobago, Guyana, Chile, Colombia, and countries in Southern Africa, Central Africa, East Africa, West Africa. In Australia and most other countries, the packaging is a green can and depicts people playing various sports.

In Australia, the MILO in2CRICKET and MILO T20 Blast programs, operated in most areas by volunteers, teach children age 5–12 how to play the game of cricket. In the 2016–2017 season, over 78,000 children participated in the programs.

Milo is very popular in Indonesia, Malaysia, and Singapore, where the brand name is synonymous with chocolate flavoured drinks: Milo has a 90% market share in Malaysia, and Malaysians were said to be the world's largest consumers of Milo. In Malaysia and Singapore, specialised trucks or vans, affectionately called Milo vans, serving up to three thousand cups of the drink are commonly seen at sports and community events and schools.

In Peru, during the 1970s military dictatorship, Milo labels displayed Peruvian motifs, such as photos and pictures of Peruvian towns, history, crops, fruits, animals, plants, as an educational aid. After 1980, when the military left power, sports predominated on the labels.

Milo is sold by Nestlé in Canada at all major food retailers. Although Milo has been available since the 1970s, a Canadian-specific flavour launched within the last decade that dissolves more quickly but maintains the sweet malt flavour profile. It competes with the British brand Ovaltine.

Aside from the International section of specific grocery stores and certain Asian grocery stores, Nestlé does not market Milo in the United States. In 2017 Colombian-manufactured Milo started appearing on shelves in supermarkets in the United States such as Walmart.

It can also be found in the United Kingdom in some Sainsbury's and Tesco supermarkets, which import it from Kenya and South Africa. Asian food specialists also stock it. Ovaltine is more popular with UK consumers.

In Ireland, it can be found in many Asian or African stores. Typically they will stock Filipino or Kenyan Milo.

In China, it is commonly sold in Western supermarkets, but also smaller convenience stores. Usually packaged in a 240gram flexible foil pouch, single-drink packets can also be purchased. The Milo itself contains more milk solids than the Australian Milo.

In the past, it was available in Portugal and Brazil. Nestlé Brazil discontinued production of Milo in Brazil, to focus on the much-popular domestic brands Nescau and Nesquik. The Chilean version of Milo is still in production and is identical in taste and texture to the one that was once produced in Brazil.

In May 2013, more than 20 years out of the Portuguese market, Nestlé reintroduced the brand, aiming at the high-end market.

In the Philippines, Nestlé partnered with the Department of Education in 2017, in a marketing response to the "energy gap" within school-aged children whose athletic and academic performance were impacted due to low energy. This raised the ethical question of advertising to children.

== Derivative products ==
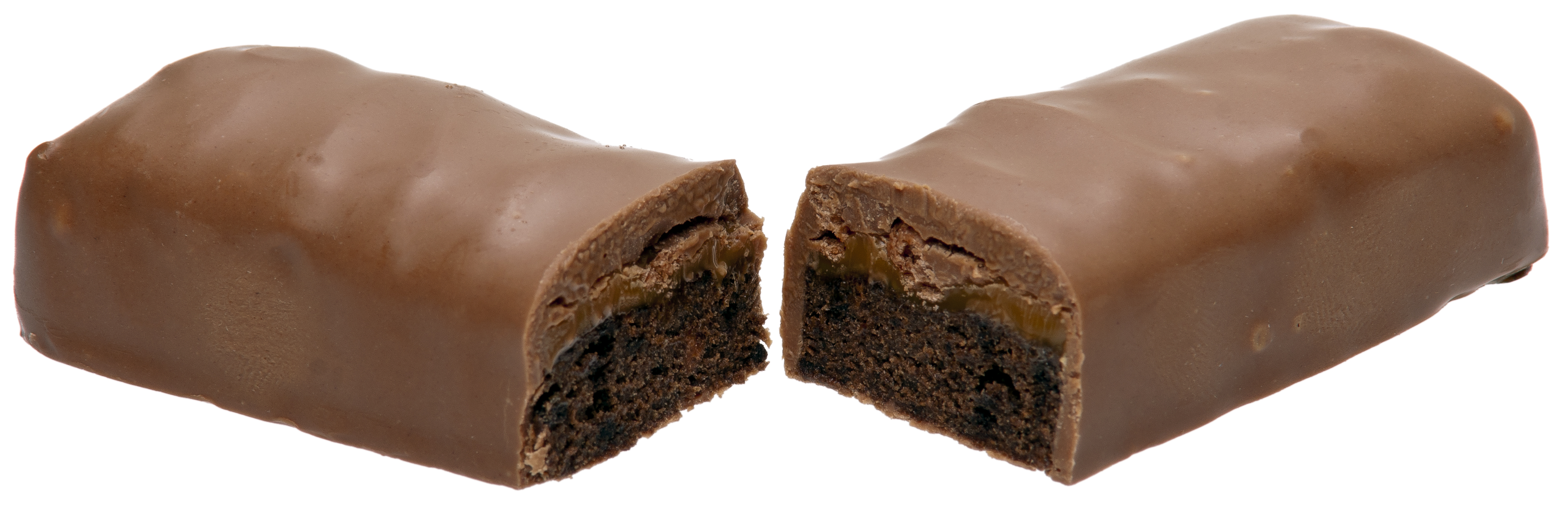
A Milo energy food bar in 2011, split

Milo was available as a snack in cube form in Nigeria, Ghana, and Dubai in 1975.

The Milo chocolate bar was a brand of brownie, caramel, Milo, and chocolate-covered candy bars, produced by Nestlé for sale in Australia and available in 2006. It included ingredients of Milo powder. It claimed to be the only milk chocolate with "choco malt" and "all natural ingredients including cocoa, milk, and malt". The chocolate bar was discontinued in Australia in 2003, replaced with an "energy food bar", which as of 2021 is no longer available either. Two varieties of Milo snack bars can be bought in packs of six.

As of 2006, there was also Milo cereal (described as "cornflakes with a Milo coating"), Milo smoothies, Milo mousse, and Milo ice-cream (a vanilla ice-cream coated with hard Milo/chocolate shell).

In South Africa, Milo Cereal and Milo Chocolate bars are available and sold in most supermarkets.

Milo nuggets have been available since 1994 in Southeast Asia and Colombia. Milo cereal balls and a range of other derivative products are marketed by Tesco (now Lotus's) in Malaysia.

In January 2026, McDonald's Australia launched the Milo Shake, a thickshake variant featuring a serving of the malt powder. This release was a part of the companies El Maco burger range marketing campaign and also featured the re-release of the Milo McFlurry, a product that originally released earlier in September 2023.

== See also ==
- Milo tin
- Akta-Vite
- Horlicks
- List of hot beverages
- Malted milk
- Milo dinosaur
- Ovaltine
- Ovomaltine
- Nesquik
