= Milo tin =

Motor vehicle term

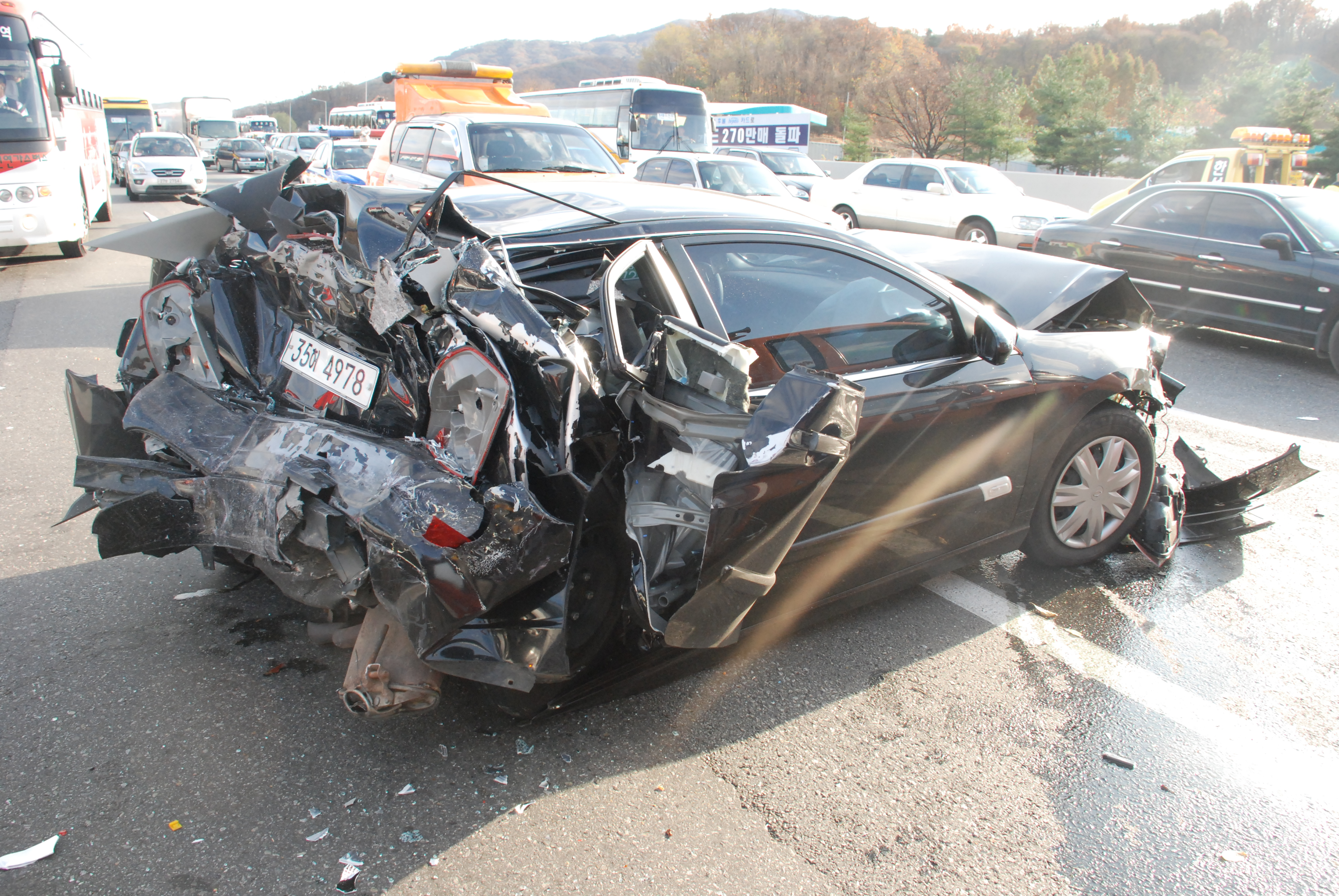

Overview
- Also called: Kereta tin Milo (Malay)

Milo tin is a Malaysian pejorative used to describe unsafe or cheaply made vehicles. It is comparable to the slang terms deathtrap and lemon.

The term can also be used to describe a cheap car that has been worked on with cheap parts, often with a loud but ineffective exhaust pipe, in a failed effort to make it racing worthy or (as with "rice burner" customization) more aesthetically pleasing. These exhausts at the rear of the car are often larger than the stock exhaust and resemble empty milo tins. The exhausts are derided by observers for simply making the cars louder and not improving performance.

== History ==
The term Milo tin originated in the 1950s as a result of shoddy workmanship and cost-cutting measures, in which damaged vehicles were often repaired with recycled Milo tins as opposed to genuine parts. The workshops would repaint the tin panels, painting over the word Milo. When the repaired vehicles became involved in subsequent accidents, the paint surface would scratch off and the brand name became visible again.

In the 1960s, the term gained further popularity as a means of criticism towards the light and flimsy construction of early Japanese cars. The Malaysian market had historically been a stronghold for Western car companies, and Japanese cars were initially perceived as inferior and cheaply made. However, the Japanese cars continued to improve and gained a reputation for quality, reliability, high fuel efficiency and value for money. By the 1970s, the Malaysian market was dominated by Japanese cars, and the usage of the term against Japanese cars gradually faded.

In the 1980s and 1990s, Milo tin regained popularity as a discriminatory term towards Proton and Perodua cars. The early Proton and Perodua vehicles lacked modern safety features such as airbags and ABS. The thin construction also drew criticism, and the door closing action produced an unpleasant tinny sound. Newer models have remedied the old problems, and Proton scored its first 5-star ANCAP safety rating in 2013. However, the negative stigma persists and the term is still widely used on Proton and Perodua cars due to consumer xenocentrism.

== See also ==
- ASEAN NCAP – The agency which assesses crash worthiness for new car models in ASEAN member states.
- Automobile safety
- Decrepit car
