= Associated Vehicle Assemblers =

Vehicle manufacturer in Mombasa, Kenya

Associated Vehicle Assemblers Limited
- Company type: Limited
- Industry: Automotive
- Founded: 1977; 49 years ago
- Headquarters: Mombasa, Kenya
- Area served: Kenya

Associated Vehicle Assemblers Limited (AVA) is an automobile and commercial vehicle manufacturer based in Mombasa, Kenya.

== History ==
Associated Vehicle Assemblers was founded in 1975 and started production in 1977.

With a market share of 40% (2012), the company is the largest vehicle manufacturer in Kenya and works for various brands. In 2008, the company employed 360 people. By the end of 2011, there were 254 workers. Until September 2017, it was owned 50 percent each by Marshalls East Africa Limited and Simba Colt Motors and was then fully taken over by Simba.

== Models ==
The company's clients included or include Mitsubishi Motors, Scania, Tata, Hino and Toyota. Other brands were Peugeot, Fiat, Iveco and Volvo (trucks). The Toyota Land Cruiser and the Toyota Hilux (1979 to 2005) were and are being assembled. Production of the Toyota Hiace (1987–2006) was discontinued, as well as the Toyota Corolla (from 1982 as a van and from 1988 as a sedan until 1998) and the Toyota Dyna (1986-2003).

Hino buses have been manufactured in AVA since 2013.
