= Petoskey Motor Speedway =

Race track

The Petoskey Motor Speedway was a dirt track jalopy racing center in northern Michigan during the mid 1950s.

== Introduction ==
The first car race in Michigan took place on October 10, 1901 between Henry Ford and Alex Winton. The race track was owned by the Detroit Driving Club of Grosse Pointe, Michigan. It had been built in 1894 as a race track for horses. Fifty years later, in the small summer resort town of Petoskey, Michigan, 300 miles north of Detroit, the Petoskey Motor Speedway was born. The northern speedway came during the time of America's new post World War II craze with jalopy stock car racing. It was the same era that Parnelli Jones rose to fame. The track was a one-quarter mile, banked, dirt speedway located on a farm field, just south of Petoskey. For four years, 1954 through 1958, thousands of summer tourists and residents of northern Michigan attended the weekly races from June through September.

== Richard Moore ==
PMS-Petoskey Motor Speedway was created by local Gambles store owner, and car enthusiast, Richard Moore. He followed the lead of Daytona Beach, Florida's Bill France Sr. who started dirt oval track car racing in 1947. France would go on to fame as the founder of NASCAR. France traveled the United States to promote his idea of stock car racing and by the 1950s there were over a thousand such tracks across the country. Michigan was one of the first states outside Florida to offer dirt track car racing and Petoskey Motor Speedway was the first such track in northern Michigan. Richard Moore's idea would soon be copied by others in the northern half of lower Michigan.

== The beginning ==
The first step in bringing Moore's dream to reality was finding an appropriate racing site. Founder Bill France felt that the safest racing track site would be a farm field that possessed high side banks to help contain the race cars on the dirt track. Also important, was to find a site where noise and traffic would not be a concern. Such a site was found by Moore in 1953, and he was allowed to rent it. The land was forty acres off Washout Road (later Eppler Road) close to the two main highways that ran from southern Michigan north to Petoskey, US 31 and US 131. Moore, his family, friends, co-workers graded the area into a quarter mile oval raceway. It was ready for its first races during Memorial Day week-end, 1954.

== Jalopy racing ==
The Petoskey Motor Speedway's oval dirt track was carved out of a farm field with a natural bowl like feature on the Charles Hitching farm. Those who were to compete had to first prove their driving abilities, and had to adhere to early racing association rules that covered the use of jalopies. One such organization in Michigan was the Lansing-based Interstate Racing Association whose rules stated no cars could be entered in jalopy races that were post World War II. The Northwest Michigan Racing Association organization adopted those same rules. The word "jalopy" meant a motor vehicle in a dilapidated condition, a junker. The type if car chosen by most drivers was a 1932 or 1933 Ford Coupe. All the glass would be removed, and a steel roll bar installed. The original gas tanks were filled with sand to add weight and a five-gallon can of gas with an electric fuel pump would then be the source of the engine's fuel.

== Jalopy drivers ==
Race drivers at Petoskey Motor Speedway usually wore old World War II goggles to help them see through the dust being created by the spinning tires. Even though the track would be graded smooth prior to every race afternoon or night, it did not take long for it to become rough and full of pot-holes. Those holes made steering difficult and many times led to a loss of control of the vehicle. The steep banks on most of the oval track's turns helped to kick up dirt and dust that also led to vehicles crashing into one another. The top speeds at PMS on the short straight-a-way would be 40 to 50 miles per hour. The roughness of the track was countered by the veteran drivers who used the trick of tying the gearshift in second gear to keep it "in-gear" while they steered. At first, some drivers wore leather helmets worn by World War II pilots. Later plastic football helmets were used, along with installing airplane type seat belts.

== PMS drivers ==
Most races at Petoskey Motor Speedway were held on summer Saturday nights beginning with the Memorial Day week-end. Charlevoix's Jim Novotny would compete, along with Boyne City's Garth Hall, Traverse City's Bob Lardie and Gene Denman, Harbor Spring's John and Jim Stradling, Norm Pemberton, and Petoskey's Bill Boyer, Norm Slocum, Dick Durlin, and Jim Procter. Drivers had to compete in trail "heats" (races) to determine the various positions of their cars in later actual races. There were usually four preliminary "heat" races followed by a raced named the "Hooligan" for the worst finishers in the earlier "heats". Then the "Aussie" race would be held featuring the mid-level finishers from the "heats." Finally the "Featured" race would take place where the most accomplished drivers at the track would compete. It would be 25 laps in length. Sometimes a "Powder Puff" race featuring female drivers would be offered.

== PMS Race Track ==
The Petoskey Motor Speedway track was covered the second year of operation, 1955, with a coating of lime kiln dust from the nearby Petoskey Cement Company plant. That helped to hold down on the dust at the track. A "pit area" was located to the southeast portion of the raceway and just past the northeast turn was located a small grandstand, announcer's box and concession stand. Every turn was protected with the placement of a railroad tie fence, and an ambulance was on hand if anyone was seriously hurt. The cost to enter was per car and would range from 50 cents up to $1.00. Many fans drove to the eastern side of the race track where they were able to park and look down the hillside to view the various car races.

== End of an era ==
The jalopy speedway in Petoskey began Memorial Day week-end of 1954 and lasted for four years. During every race a flagman would use his various colored flags to direct the drivers. The green flag was used to start the race, and a yellow flag was used to alert drivers to a problem up ahead. During a yellow flag there could be no advancing of one's position. It the red flag was waved the race would come to a stop. The final lap of each race was indicated by the use of the white flag. When the checkered flag would appear it meant the race was over and a final cool down lap was then taken. During one of the 1958 PMS races, flagman Frank Rostar was struck and injured. That accident had a dampening effect on the running of the track. It eventually led to the track's closure after a four-year run. The track today is overgrown with grasses and pine trees but can still be viewed from above by satellite.
