= ASEAN NCAP =

Automobile safety assessment programme in Southeast Asia

New Car Assessment Program for Southeast Asia
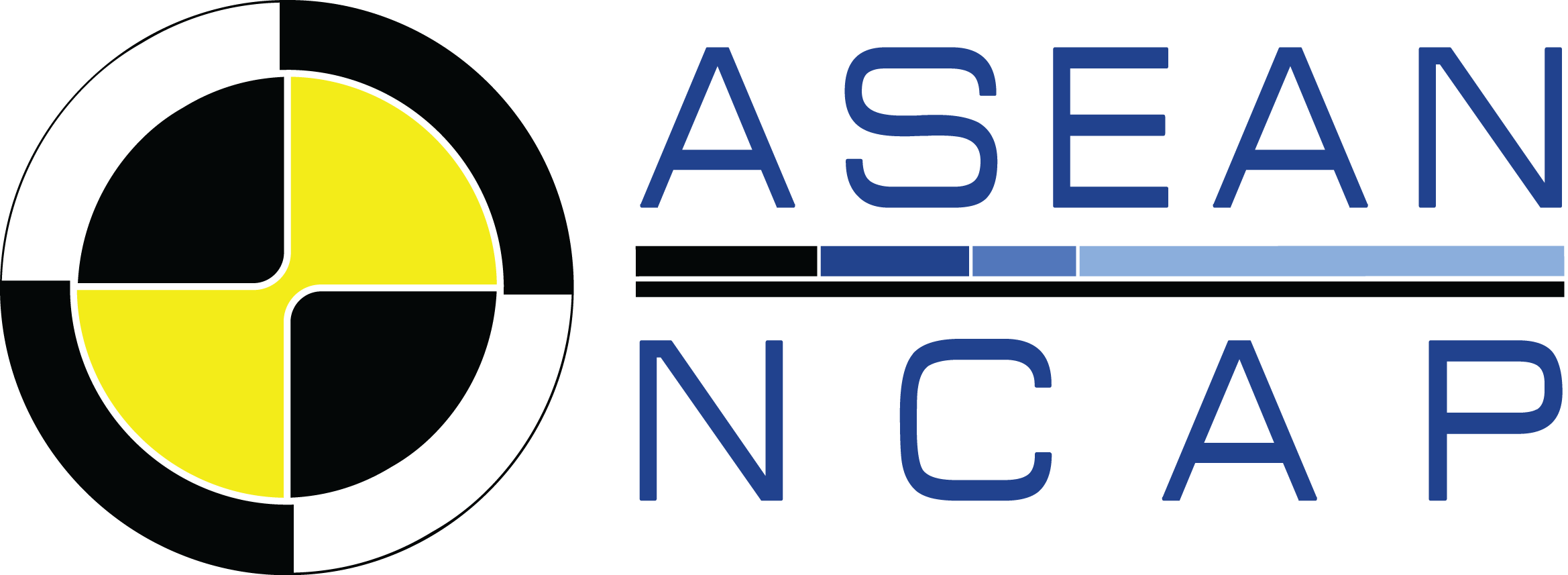
- Formation: 2011; 15 years ago
- Headquarters: Kajang, Selangor, Malaysia
- Region served: Southeast Asia
- Services: Automotive safety assessment
- Members: 7 organisations (2023)
- Website: https://www.aseancap.org

The New Car Assessment Program for Southeast Asia, or known as ASEAN NCAP, is an automobile safety rating program jointly established by the Malaysian Institute of Road Safety Research (MIROS) and Global New Car Assessment Program (Global NCAP) upon a collaborative MoU signed by both parties during the FIA (Fédération Internationale de l'Automobile) Foundation Annual General Assembly in New Delhi, India on 7 December 2011.

In January 2013, ASEAN NCAP has published the program's first phase results involving seven popular models in the ASEAN region’s market. At this stage, two separate assessments conducted in the rating scheme which are the Adult Occupant Protection (AOP) by star-rating and Child Occupant Protection (COP) by percentage-based rating.

== Member organizations ==
As of 2023, the following organizations are officially in the ASEAN NCAP member organizations:

- Malaysian Institute of Road Safety Research (MIROS)
- Global New Car Assessment Program (GNCAP)
- Automobile Association of Cambodia (AAC) from 2014
- Automobile Association of Malaysia (AAM)
- Automobile Association Philippines (AAP)
- Automobile Association of Singapore (AAS)
- Royal Automobile Association of Thailand (RAAT) from 2014

=== Financial support organizations ===
- Global New Car Assessment Program (GNCAP)
- Malaysian Institute of Road Safety Research (MIROS)

== Testing ==
Due to the high number of deaths on motorcycles in the region, ASEAN NCAP began prioritizing biker safety from 2017.

== Malaysia ==
Since March 2020, it is mandatory to show a safety label with all display vehicles for sale in Malaysia. The printed information must show the ASEAN NCAP safety rating. Other NCAP safety ratings may also be shown in addition to the ASEAN NCAP safety rating. If the ASEAN NCAP rating has not yet been determined then other NCAP safety ratings may be used but only with approval from ASEAN NCAP – who will verify that the other NCAP rating is appropriate for this model.

== Testing lab ==
Name	Location
MIROS PC3 Laboratory	Malacca, Malaysia
Japan Automobile Research (JARI)	Tokyo, Japan
The China Automotive Technology & Research Center (CATARC)	Tianjin, China

== Comparison groups ==
The results are grouped into 5 increasingly demanding classes:

- 2012-2016
- 2017-2020 (based on Euro NCAP 2015)
- 2021-2025 (based on Euro NCAP 2018)
- 2026-2030 (based on Euro NCAP 2021)
- 2031+

== See also ==
- Milo tin
