= Look East policy (Malaysia) =

Malaysian economic policy

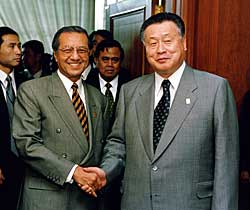
Malaysian Prime Minister Mahathir Mohamad and Japanese Prime Minister Yoshirō Mori

Look East Policy (Malay: Dasar Pandang ke Timur or also known as LEP) was an economic policy that was launched by then Malaysian Prime Minister Tun Dr. Mahathir Mohamad in 1982. The policy was announced during 5th Joint Annual Conference of MAJECA/JAMECA held in Hilton Hotel Kuala Lumpur. The policy was meant to seek alternative after Mahathir launched "Buy British Last" policy in response to British Prime Minister Margaret Thatcher economic coercion as a response to the Dawn Raid maneuver in 1981 that briefly strained Malaysia–United Kingdom relations. The purpose of the policies was to gain knowledge from developing East Asian countries such as Japan, South Korea, and Taiwan in order to develop Malaysia. More than 15,000 Malaysians were said to have enjoyed the benefit of this policy.

== Background ==
Malaysia's current economic development is inherited from three previous stages, starting with the rapid growth and development of the natural resources industry from the mid-19th century until 1914, followed by a period of fluctuation or instability of the natural resources industry between the First and Second World Wars and finally the consolidation and rationalization of the natural resources industry along with economic diversification after 1945. Although Malaysia was a former British colony, Japanese economic interests have contributed to the change in foreign policy from a Pro-Western Policy during the colonial and post-colonial era to the Look East Policy during the administration of Tun Dr. Mahathir Mohamad.

Even before his premiership, Mahathir already showed his affinity toward Japanese work ethics. The introduction of Bumiputera policy that favors the native Malay over Chinese and Indians has improved the living standards among the Malay community, however rampant problems such as laziness and inefficiency has become rampant among public services. Aware to this condition, Mahathir proposed that Malaysia should learn the Japanese work ethics that prioritize collective over individual interest.

In September 1981, Malaysian government successfully took over British-owned plantation company Guthrie Corporation via its state owned investment management company Permodalan Nasional Berhad by rapid acquisition from London Stock Exchange. The movement angered then British Prime Minister Margaret Thatcher in which she enacted stricter stock market regulations to prevent similar events and raised tuition fee to foreign students which caused the status of Malaysian scholars in United Kingdom being put in limbo. Malaysia retaliates by limiting imports from British companies, publicly discouraging British goods and services unless deemed absolutely necessary. This movement later caused Mahathir to find alternative to Western economic reliance and seek to adopt the work ethic and economic model of Japan and South Korea for Malaysian development.

In order to implement the Look East policy, Mahathir visited Japan in January 1983 and South Korea in October 1983 to study both countries economic model and underlined the strategy of its implementation. In order to implement the Eastern economic model, Mahathir has sought collaboration with East Asian government to seek training such as industrial training programmes, academic studies programmes, executive training, and entrepreneur training programmes.

The second phase implemented was the behavioral change within the society. The 3 main core of these behavioral changes includes excellent services which makes most executives able to assess performance of every employees. The second one was Clean, Efficient, and Trusted concepts that introduce positive attitude toward civil servants. Exemplary Leadership was implemented to every high ranking civil servants in to lead by example.

The Look East policy has also changed the work structures in Malaysia. In order to emulate the East Asian discipline work ethic, the Malaysian government introduced the punch card and name tag system. The Work Quality Improvement Team (QCC) was also implemented to enable workers to exchange ideas with each others. In addition, the local bill payment services and work procedure manual was also implemented in order to give Malaysians convinience.

== Bilateral relationship ==
=== Japan ===
Relationship with Japan was the cornerstone of Mahathir's Look East policy. Mahathir first visited Japan in January 1983 which he welcomed by Japanese Foreign Minister Shintaro Abe in order to deepen bilateral relationship between both countries and to learn Japanese work ethic and development model to be implemented in Malaysia. Impressed with Japanese post-World War II economic recovery, Mahathir decided to send Malaysian students and trainees to be educated in Japan. The policy was regarded as turning point of relationship between Japan and Malaysia.

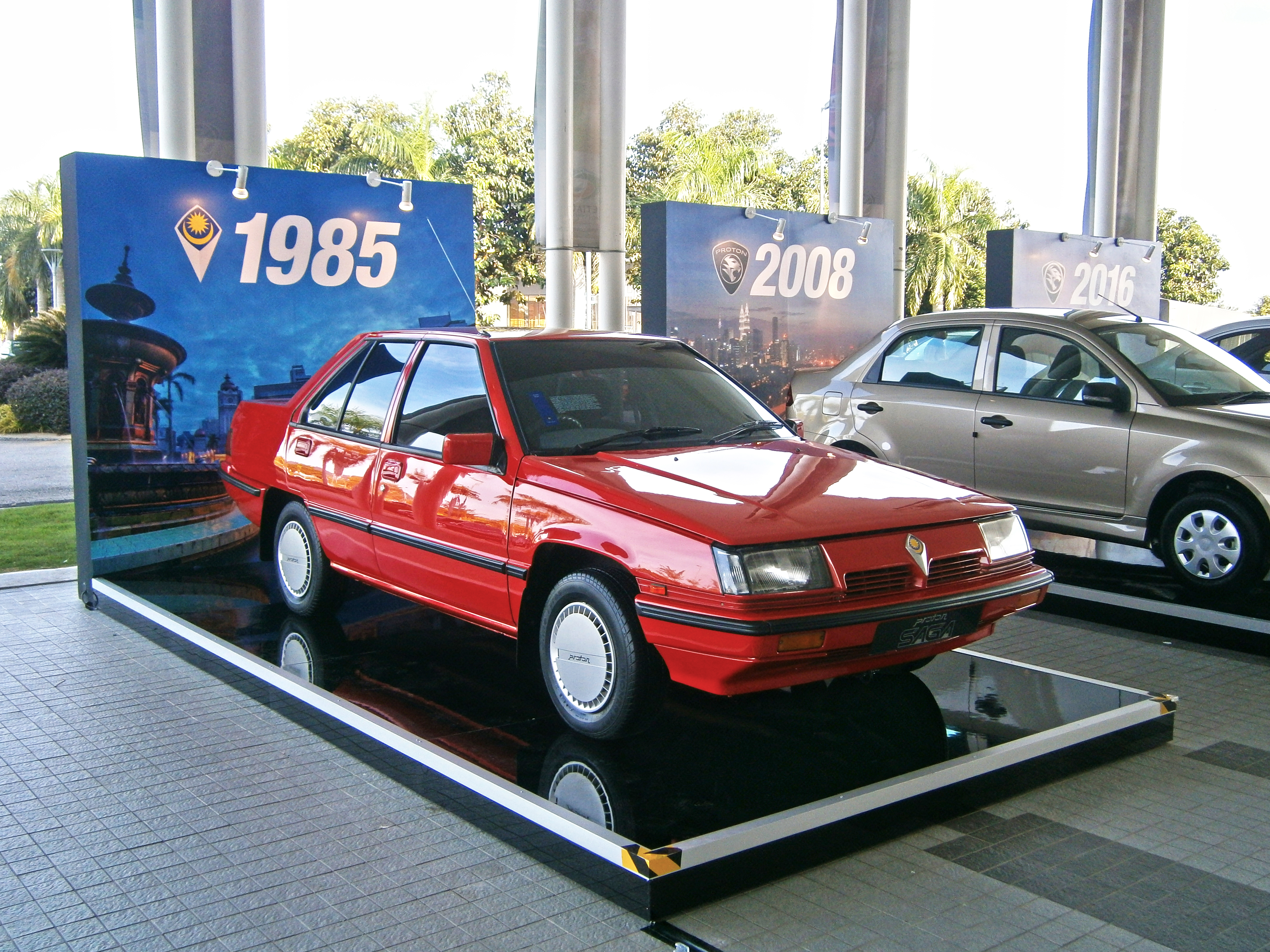
Proton Saga

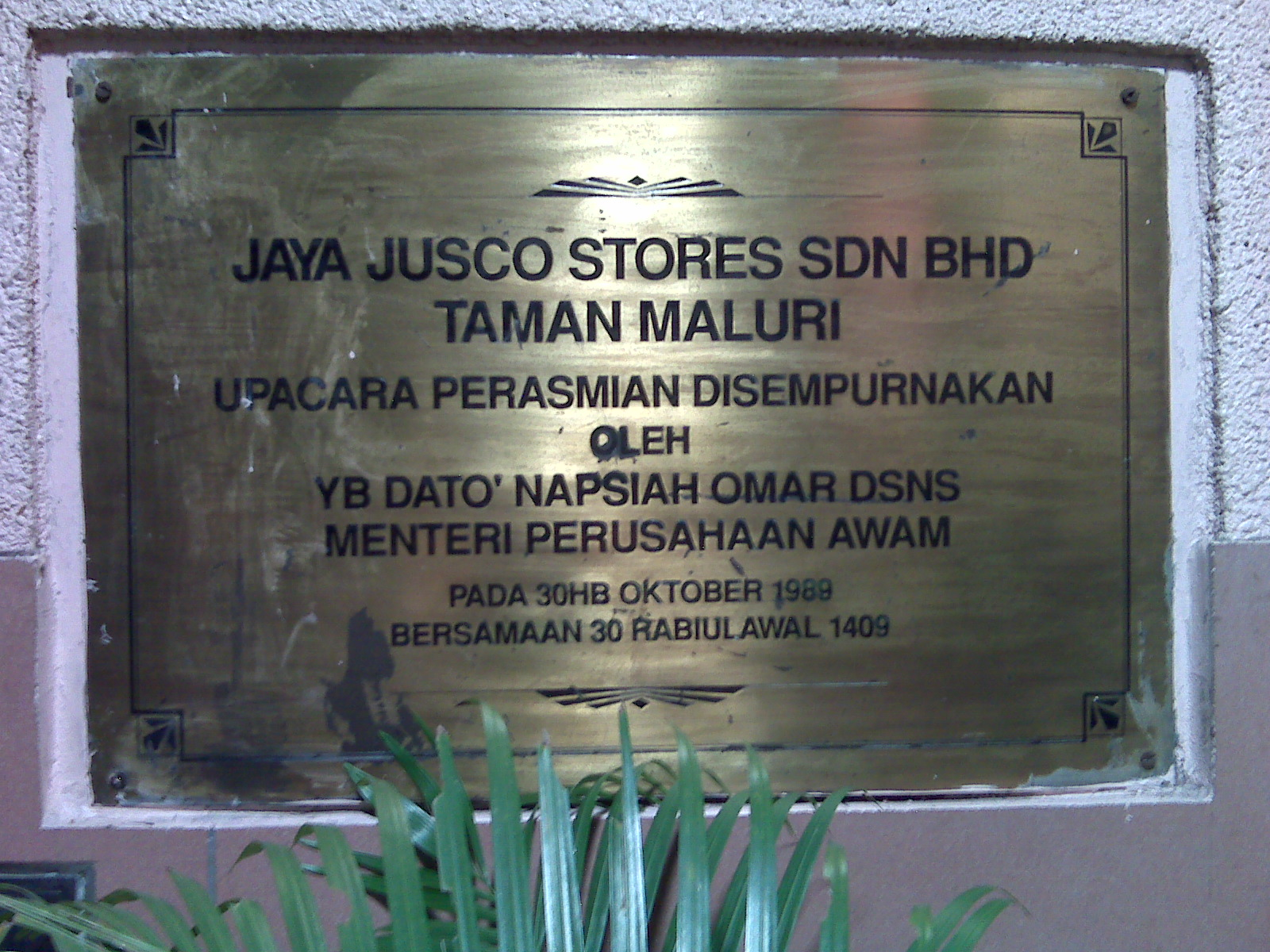
A plaque commemorating the opening of Jusco in Taman Maluri, Kuala Lumpur on 30 October 1989

During the first tenure of Mahathir premiership, Japan and Malaysia collaborated in several development sectors in order to help the industrialization of Malaysia. Due to Mahathir encouragement to develop the heavy industries, The Malaysian national car project was unveiled. Mahathir invited Mitsubishi Motors to participate in the development project and in 1985, Proton Saga was introduced as rebadged version of Mitsubishi Lancer Fiore. After national car project, Mahathir also aware of the need for Malaysia to modernize its retail sector. In order to achieve this, he approached Jusco President Takuya Okada to open a Japanese supermarket in Malaysia. Jusco, partnered with Cold Storage opened its first store in Plaza Dayabumi in 1985. In the aftermath of 1985 Plaza Accord and the appreciation of Japanese Yen, many Japanese companies such as Mitsubishi, Honda, Sony, and Panasonic moved its production overseas to lower cost, including in Malaysia.

The Look East Policy has resulted Japan to be Malaysia second largest trading partner. Between 1997 and 2002, Malaysia recorded 643 Japanese investment projects valued at RM11.4 billion. Mahathir also secured low-interest Official Development Assistance (ODA) loans from Japan, supporting infrastructure and industrial development. One notable project built using loan from ODA was the development of Port Klang.

=== South Korea ===
While relationship between Malaysia and South Korea were less prominent during the first Mahathir premiership, South Korea was seen as one of Malaysia foreign direct investment sources. In August 1983, Mahathir visited South Korea to study its rapid post-Korean War development model and work ethics. Similar to his approach with Japan, Mahathir also sent students and industrial trainees to receive training or attend universities in South Korea although the numbers of students and industrial trainees sent to South Korea are not as much as those who were sent to Japan.

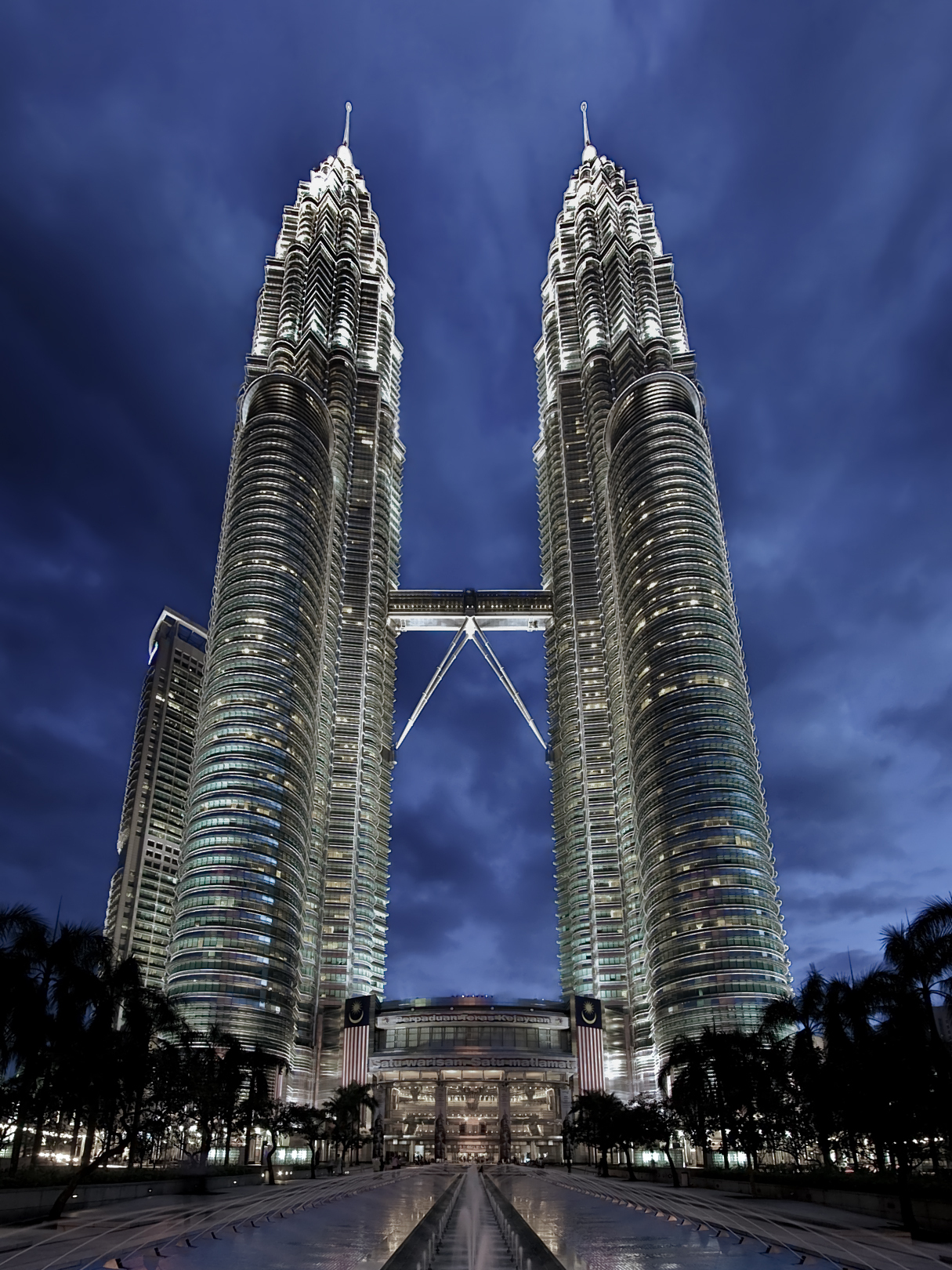
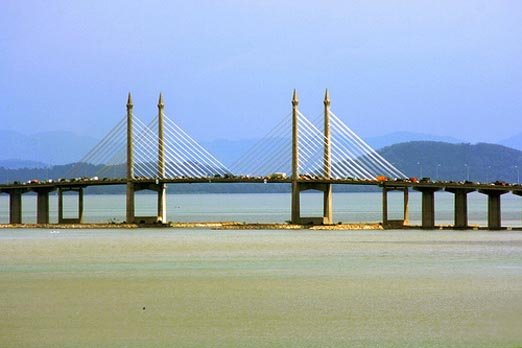
Petronas Towers (left) and Penang Bridge (right) were built by South Korean companies.

Following the introduction of the Look East Policy, both Malaysia and South Korea formalized numerous bilateral agreements such as the avoidance of double taxation agreement in 1982, visa abolishment agreement in 1983, technology and science co-operation agreement in 1985, and investment guarantee agreement in 1988. South Korea was involved in several infrastructure projects in Malaysia such as Penang Bridge that was built by Hyundai and completed in 1985 and the Tower 2 of Petronas Towers that was built by Samsung Engineering & Construction and Kukdong Engineering & Construction which was completed in 1996. Until 1996, a total of 235 South Korean investments projects to Malaysia worth RM4.6 billion were approved for the manufacturing sector, comprising the production of non-metallic products, electrical and electronic products, wood and wood products, rubber products and chemicals.

== Look East Policy 2.0 ==
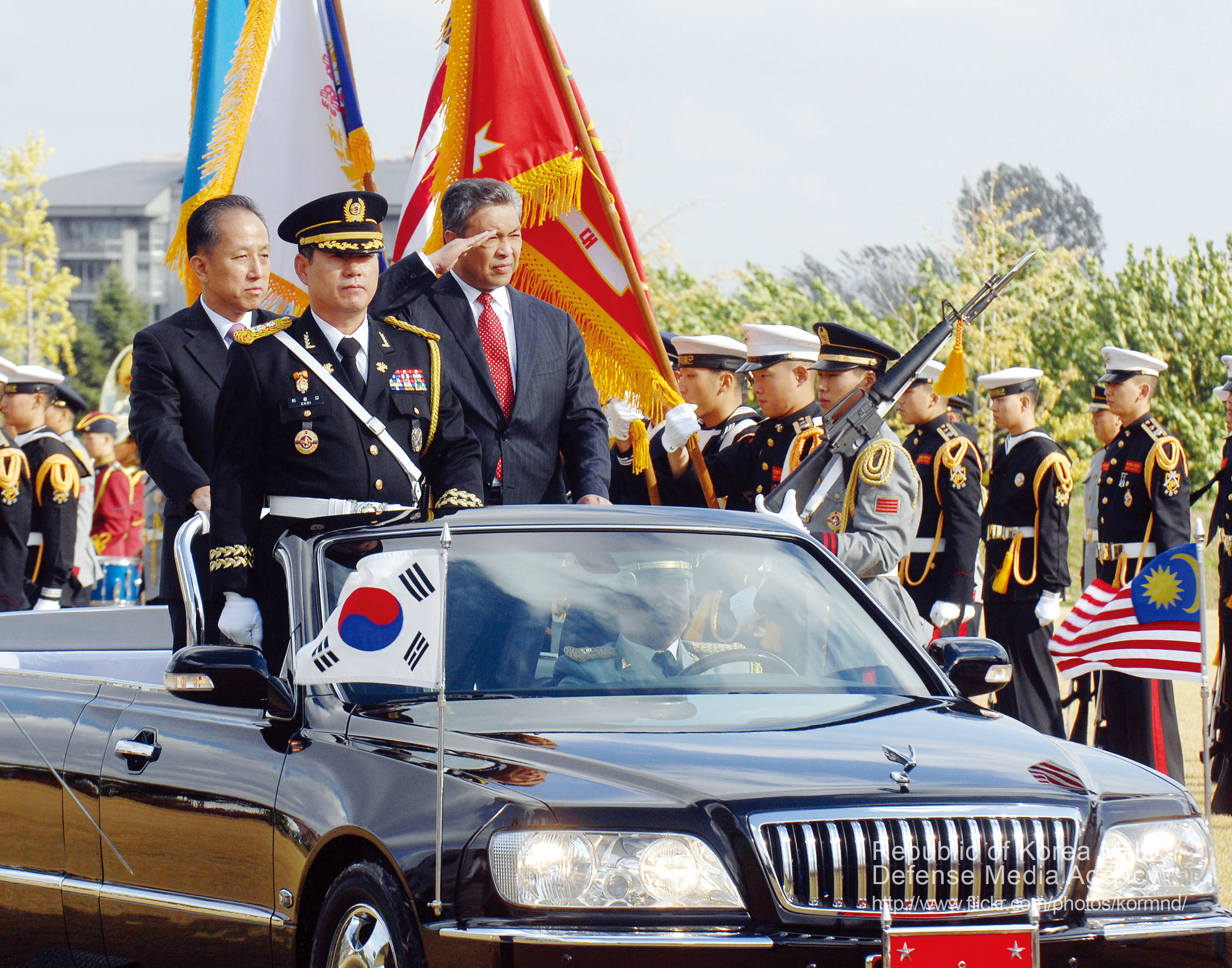
South Korean defense minister Kim Tae-young welcomed his Malaysian counterpart Ahmad Zahid Hamidi to Seoul in 2009

Even though after Mahathir stepped down in 2003, the Look East Policy would continue under his successor Abdullah Ahmad Badawi even though the scale is now smaller compared to that under Mahathir premiership. The second wave of the Look East Policy was announced in 2013 during the premiership of Dato' Sri Najib Razak after he attended the MAJECA-JAMECA joint conference at Hotel Istana in Kuala Lumpur, focusing on strategic sectors that emphasize high technology and high services industries. The Malaysian Trade Minister Dato' Sri Mustapa Mohamed stated that the Look East Policy 2.0 will be focusing more on strategic relationship with South Korea. On 2015, Najib held a bilateral meeting between him and his Japanese counterpart Shinzo Abe to discuss the second wave of Look East Policy and stated that it should fit the Wawasan 2020 agenda.

The policy was once again revived by Mahathir after his return as Prime Minister in 2018. During his second wave of the Look East Policy, Mahathir added green technology and biotechnology to the focus on its cooperation with Japan and also welcomed Japanese universities to open its branch in Malaysia to accommodate Malaysians who wished to study in Japan but can't afford the cost of living in Japan In April 2024, University of Tsukuba become the first Japanese university to open its branch in Malaysia.

On 2019, Mahathir travelled to South Korea to meet South Korean President Moon Jae-in. Both Moon and Mahathir had agreed to synergize Malaysia's Look East Policy and South Korea's New Southern Policy to benefit both nations. The policies will be focused on cooperation in various fields including information technologies, defense, healthcare, and ties between small to medium businesses in both countries. In 2018, South Korean chaebol SK Group signed a memorandum of understanding (MoU) with Malaysian government to invest in information and communications technology (ICT) and 5G, oil and gas, green technology and urban development sectors.

== See also ==
- New Southbound Policy
- New Southern Policy (South Korea)
