= New Southbound Policy =

Taiwanese government policy

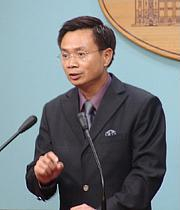
James C. F. Huang, first director of the New Southbound Policy Office.

The New Southbound Policy (Chinese: 新南向政策; pinyin: Xīn Nán Xiàng Zhèngcè) is an initiative of the Taiwanese government under President Tsai Ing-wen that aims to enhance cooperation and exchange between Taiwan and 18 countries in Southeast Asia, South Asia and Australasia.

James C. F. Huang was appointed the first director of the New Southbound Policy Office.

== History ==
During the Cold War, Taiwan was aligned with a number of countries in the Southeast Asia region in an anti-communist alliance during the Vietnam War.

The original Southbound Policy was created to make Taiwan less dependent on mainland China and to improve Taiwan's cooperation with other countries. The new policy was officially launched on 5 September 2016.

== Cooperation countries ==
The 18 countries targeted by the New Southbound Policy are:

- Thailand
- Indonesia
- Philippines
- Malaysia
- Singapore
- Brunei
- Vietnam
- Myanmar
- Cambodia
- Laos
- India
- Pakistan
- Bangladesh
- Nepal
- Sri Lanka
- Bhutan
- Australia
- New Zealand

=== Connection to Free and Open Indo Pacific (FOIP) strategy ===
In order to support the aims of the New Southbound Policy, the Ministry of Foreign Affairs Department of East Asian and Pacific Affairs officially established the Indo-Pacific Affairs Section. One focus of the Indo-Pacific section is to forge more cooperative ties with the United States, Australia, and Japan, all of whom have share similar visions for a "Free and Open Indo-Pacific."

=== Profiles of cooperating countries ===
Country	2018 ease of doing business index ranking (out of 190 countries)	Currency	Time zone	Taiwanese business association	Visa entry program to Taiwan
Thailand	26	Baht (฿)	ICT (UTC+07:00)	http://ttba.or.th/	14 days visa-free entry from 1 Aug 2018 to 31 July 2019
Indonesia	72	Rupiah (Rp)	Various (UTC+07:00 to UTC+09:00)		Online visa application
Philippines	113	Peso (₱)	PST (UTC+08:00)		14 days visa-free entry from 1 Aug 2018 to 31 July 2019
Malaysia	24	Ringgit (RM)	MST (UTC+08:00)	https://www.twcham.org.my/	30 days visa-free entry
Singapore	2	Singapore dollar	SST (UTC+08:00)		30 days visa-free entry
Brunei	56	Brunei dollar	BNT (UTC+08:00)		14 days visa-free entry from 1 Aug 2018 to 31 July 2019
Vietnam	68	Đồng (₫)	(UTC+07:00)	http://ctcvn.vn/	Online visa application
Myanmar	171	Kyat (K), baht (฿)	MMT (UTC+06:30)		Online visa application
Cambodia	135	Riel, dollar ($), baht (฿)	KRAT/ICT (UTC+07:00)		Online visa application
Laos	141	Kip (₭), baht (฿)	ICT (UTC+07:00)		Online visa application
India	100	Indian rupee (₹)	IST (UTC+05:30)	http://www.taiwan-india.org.tw/zh/home.php	Online visa application
Pakistan	122	Pakistani rupee	PST (UTC+05:00)		General visa
Nepal	105	Nepalese rupee	NST (UTC+05:45)		Visa application from the Taipei Economic and Cultural Center in India
Bangladesh	177	Taka (৳)	BST (UTC+06:00)		General visa
Sri Lanka	111	Sri Lankan rupee	SLST (UTC+05:30)		Visa application from the Taipei Economic and Cultural Center
Bhutan	75	Ngultrum (BTN) and Indian rupee (INR)	BTT (UTC+06:00)		Visa application from the Taipei Economic and Cultural Center
Australia	14	Australian dollar	Various (UTC+08:00 to UTC+10:30): minor variations from the three basic time zones also exist		90 days visa-free entry until 31 December 2018
New Zealand	1	New Zealand dollar	NZST (UTC+12:00): the Chatham Islands have a separate time zone 45 minutes ahead of the rest of New Zealand	https://tba.org.nz/	90 days visa-free entry

== Cooperation aspects ==
The New Southbound Policy is for Taiwan to cooperate with 18 countries in the following aspects:

- Trade
- Technology
- Agriculture
- Medicine
- Education
- Tourism

== Implementation measures ==
=== Promote economic collaboration ===
- Trade offices will be set up by the Ministry of Economic Affairs in India, Indonesia, Myanmar and Thailand to assist the local integration of Taiwanese companies
- Interested Taiwanese businesses will be able to access market and investment information of all countries covered under the New Southbound Policy via newly established information services

=== Conduct talent exchange ===
- The Taiwan Education Center, Foundation for International Cooperation in Higher Education of Taiwan and universities in Taiwan help execute higher education talents exchange programs, including teaching Taiwanese Mandarin in cooperated countries locally and accept students from cooperated countries to apply for scholarships to study in Taiwan.

Universities in Taiwan	Responsible Countries
National Sun Yat-sen University	Philippines
National Taiwan University	Malaysia
Asia University (Taiwan)	Indonesia
Chung Hua University Taiwan	Philippines (Adamson University)

=== Share resources ===
- Expanding scholarships to students from ASEAN countries up to 60,000 students by 2019.

=== Visas for the cooperation countries ===
- In order to improve tourism, especially from Southeast Asian countries, Taiwan has expanded visa-free entry for citizens of the Philippines, Thailand, Russia, and Brunei up until 2021.

A 2024 US government report noted that human traffickers took advantage of the policy's relaxed visa requirements to "lure Southeast Asian students and tourists to Taiwan and subject them to forced labor and sex trafficking" and a 2025 report by the National Human Rights Commission "found the government did not properly regulate admissions, work-study rules, and internships during the early stages of a New Southbound Policy education-industry collaboration program." Some recommendations that the commission offered to address the situation included "enact new regulations for off-campus internships or improve the current regulations" and "establishing online resources for vulnerable students and better response mechanisms for when abuse occurs." In 2023, a Vietnamese student died while on a work-study program offered under NSP, leading the Control Yuan to censure the Ministry of Education. In response, the education ministry said it "ordered universities to conduct reviews to ensure all businesses accepting student interns adhere to health and safety regulations."

== Budget ==
The operational budget for the policy implementation is taken from the Presidential Office budget.

== Slogans ==
The slogan "Taiwan helps Asia, and Asia helps Taiwan” has been promoted by President Tsai.

== Outcomes ==
An analysis of the first year economic performance of the policy by the National Bureau of Asian Research in 2018 found that the "increasing economic ties between Taiwan and Southeast Asia were more visible in outbound investment than in exports." An article by Pasha L. Hsieh in 2019 noted that "although China and Hong Kong still account for almost 40% of Taiwan’s external trade, the ten ASEAN states’ collective share has increased to 15 per cent." Two think-tank articles, one in 2018 from Brookings and one from Chatham House in 2020, both said that NSP had made progress in meeting its goals. A 2024 book edited by Suisheng Zhao said the policy did not significantly reduced Taiwan's economic dependence on mainland China as the value of Taiwan's 2021 exports to the mainland and Hong Kong increased 24.8% from 2020 to reach an all-time high of US $188.9 billion. Another book edited in 2024 by Gunter Schubert said the growth rates of Taiwan's exports to NSP partner nations from 2021 onwards surpassed those for its other major trading partners (U.S., Japan and China) and the trade volume between the two sides reached a record high of $180.3 billion in 2022.

== See also ==
- New Southern Policy (South Korea)
- Foreign relations of Taiwan
