= New Southern Policy (South Korea) =

Policy of the Moon Jae-in administration

South Korea aims to develop its relation with the ASEAN countries

The New Southern Policy (Korean: 신남방정책) was a foreign policy of the Moon Jae-in administration of South Korea. Its focus was to improve ties between South Korea, India, and ASEAN countries, in order to elevate South Korea's position to equal countries such as the United States, China, Japan, and Russia.

== History ==
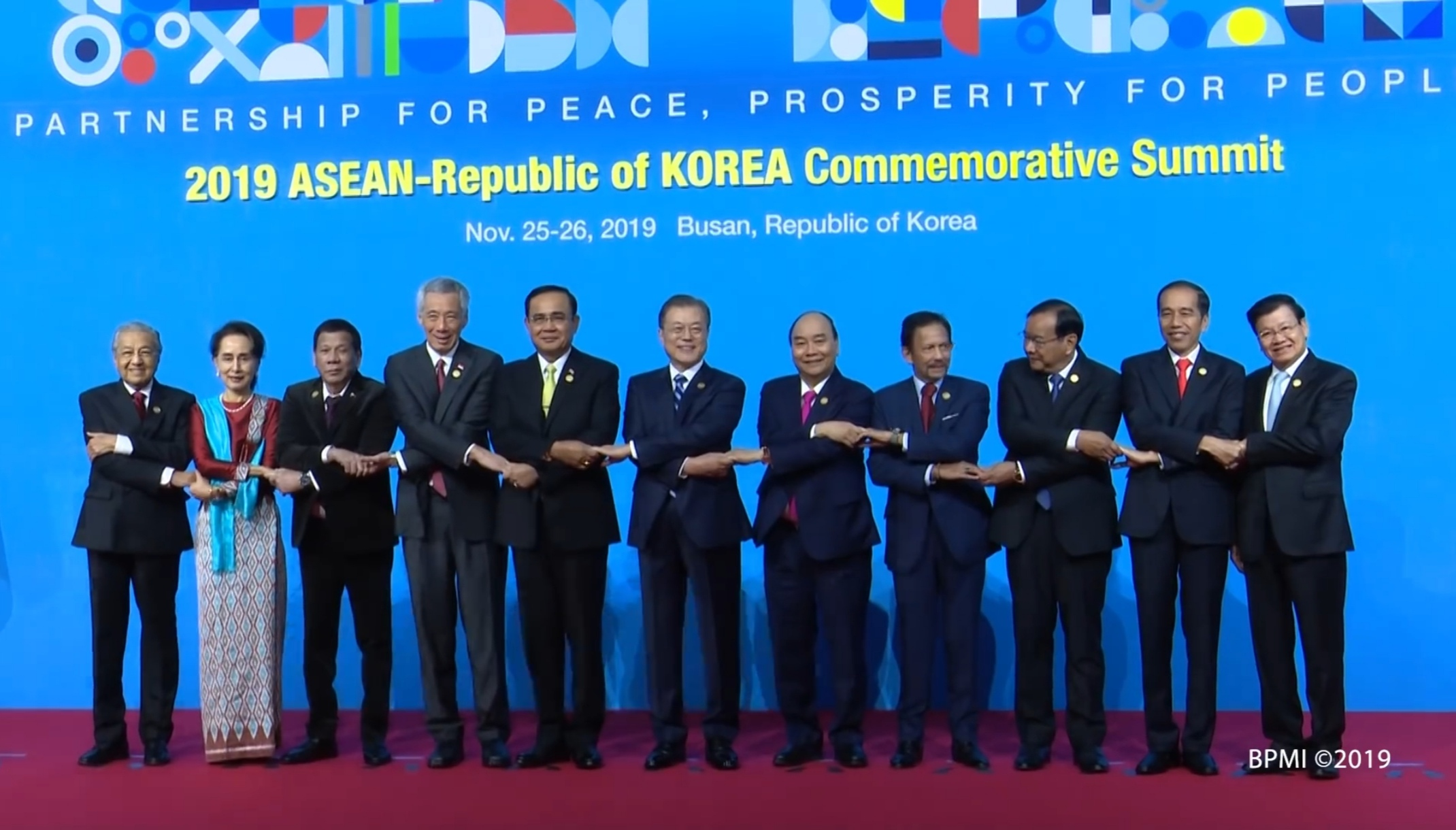
ASEAN-South Korea Commemorative Summit (2019)

When Moon Jae-in took office in 2017, he launched this policy in order to bolster relationships with ASEAN countries. The New Southern Policy aimed to build a ‘people-centered community of peace and prosperity’, centered around the ‘3P’: People (사람), Peace (평화), and Prosperity (상생번영).

The New Southern Policy was complemented by the New Northern Policy.

The Korean government had goals such as exporting to ASEAN countries, securing trade and economic cooperation to increase economic growth, and alleviating trade dependence on China. It hosted the Korea-ASEAN Special Summit in Korea and upgraded the Korea-Mekong Foreign Ministers' Meeting to the Korea-Mekong Summit.

One concrete result was that the representative office of the Republic of Korea to ASEAN was established at the Indonesian Embassy in Korea. Through this, ASEAN diplomacy was raised to the level of diplomacy among the four powers, and the existing relationship between Korea and ASEAN countries was strengthened. In addition, Korea joined the Regional Comprehensive Economic Partnership Agreement, a free trade agreement with the Philippines and Indonesia, and signed a Digital Economy Partnership Agreement with Singapore.

The Korean government decided that its Indo-Pacific strategy and the New Southern Policy could work together.

=== 2019 ASEAN-ROK Commemorative Summit ===
The 2019 ASEAN-ROK Commemorative Summit was held in Busan from 25 to 26 November 2017 in order to celebrate the 30th anniversary of the ASEAN-ROK Dialogue Partnership. The summit become the center of the New Southern Policy. After the summit, ASEAN countries and Republic of Korea signed a memorandum of understanding that focused on development cooperation. During this summit, the Republic of Korean and ASEAN established a joint startup fund to create more unicorn enterprises. The summit also established New Southern business centres to help Korean companies to expand into ASEAN countries.

=== ROK-Mekong Summit ===
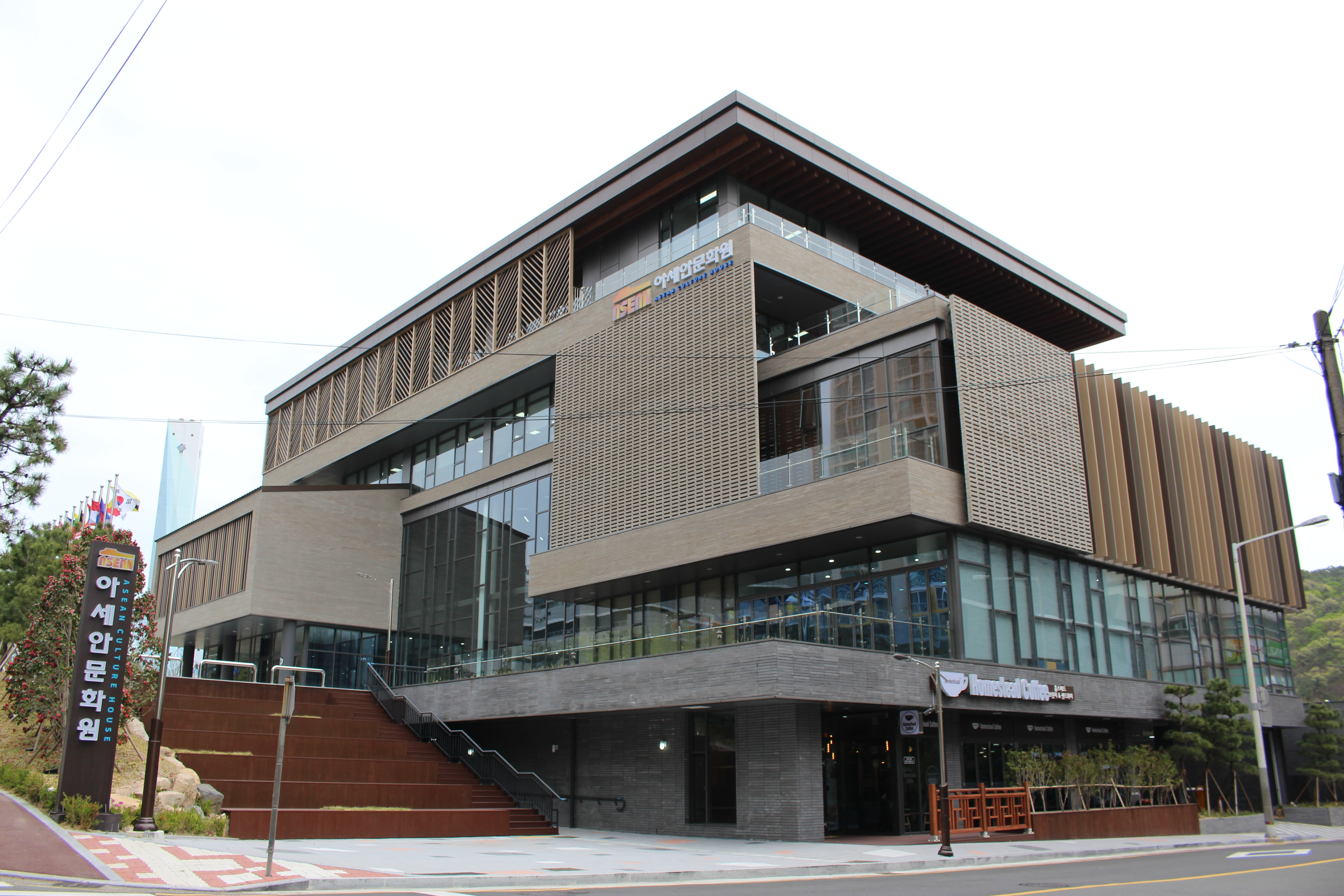
ASEAN culture house in South Korea (2018)

The ROK-Mekong Summit became a series of summits that were held annually between the Republic of Korea and countries that were crossed by the Mekong River (Thailand, Vietnam, Laos, and Cambodia). They began on 27 November 2017. The purpose was to boost cooperation between Republic of Korea and 4 ASEAN countries. The first summit successfully created the Mekong-Han River Declaration for Establishing/Partnership for People, Prosperity and Peace sectors.

== Aftermath ==
The Yoon Suk Yeol government, which took office after the Moon Jae-in administration, abolished the New Southern Policy and announced a new Indo-Pacific strategy.

== See also ==
- New Southbound Policy in Taiwan
- Act East policy in India
- Look East policy in Malaysia
- Regional Comprehensive Economic Partnership
- ASEAN Free Trade Area
- Indo-Pacific Economic Framework
- Trans Pacific Partnership
