= Foundation for International Cooperation in Higher Education of Taiwan =

Non-profit organization

- Founded: November 2005
- Founder: Ministry of Education (Taiwan), Universities in Taiwan
- Type: Nonprofit organization
- Location(s): Republic of China (Taiwan); Taipei City
- Key people: Chairperson: Tsai-Yen Li; CEO: Tzu-Bin Lin
- Website: https://www.fichet.org.tw/en/

The Foundation for International Cooperation in Higher Education of Taiwan (FICHET; Chinese: 高等教育國際合作基金會; pinyin: Gāoděng Jiāoyù Guójì Hézuò Jījīnhuì) was established in November 2005 by the Ministry of Education (Taiwan) and over 100 universities in Taiwan, and inaugurated formally in January 2006. Currently, the Foundation has a total of 119 member universities and colleges that are also its permanent member universities.

== Mission ==
FICHET coordinates domestic education systems, including the Association of National Universities of Taiwan, the Association of National Universities of Science and Technology of Taiwan, the Association of Private Universities and Colleges of Taiwan, and the Association of Private Universities and Colleges of Technology in Taiwan to promote international cooperation in higher education of Taiwan.

By organizing international seminars of higher education, holding university fairs abroad, promoting domestic higher education and recruiting international students, FICHET encourages studying abroad in Taiwan and assists in international academic cooperation in higher education, etc.

=== Educator Conference ===
FICHET coordinates and leads Taiwan's higher education institutions to participate in international educators’ conferences such as APAIE, NAFSA and EAIE annually to increase the international visibility of Taiwan's higher education, establish new cooperative programs, and attract more international students to study in Taiwan.

=== Bilateral Exchange ===
In response to the impact of internationalization and globalization, FICHET has expanded Taiwan's higher education exchange and collaboration programs by strengthening bilateral ties with specific countries or regions, including establishing and deepening the exchange programs, dual-degree programs, academic cooperation, and exchange opportunities between Taiwanese universities and overseas, seeks to promote the internationalization of Taiwanese universities and colleges and to act as a bridge/platform for international cooperation.

- Asia
  - China: The Executive Conference on International and Cross-strait Affairs
  - Japan: Taiwan-Japan University Presidents' Forum, Taipei-Osaka Higher Education Conference
  - India: Taiwan-India University Presidents' Forum
- Europe
  - EU Region: Taiwan-Europe Higher Education Conference, Taiwan-Europe Higher Education Partnership Networking
  - Austria: Taiwan-Austria Higher Education Forum
  - Belgium: Taiwan-Belgium Higher Education Roundtable
  - Czech: Taiwan-Czech Higher Education Days
  - France: Taiwan-France Higher Education Forum
  - Germany: Taiwanese-German Higher Education Policy Forum
  - Hungary: Taiwan-Hungary Roundtable
  - Lithuania: Taiwan-Lithuania Higher Education Forum
  - Poland: Taiwan-Poland Higher Education Forum
  - Russia: Taiwan-Russia Higher Education Roundtable
  - United Kingdom: Taiwan-UK Higher Education Forum
- America
  - Canada: Taiwan-Canada Higher Education Forum
  - United States: Taiwan-Florida Higher Education Conference, Taiwan-Maryland Higher Education Conference, Taiwan-US International Education Administrators/Senior Staff Networking Event
- Oceania
  - New Zealand: Taiwan-New Zealand Higher Education Forum

=== Taiwan Education Center ===
The Ministry of Education of Taiwan laid down the “Guidelines on Subsidizing the Establishment of the Taiwan Education Center Overseas” issued on 8 February 2007, to implement the Executive Yuan’s enhancement program on international student enrollment and the governmental policy of promoting teaching Chinese as a second foreign language, and set up branch offices of Taiwan Education Center (TEC) to publicize Higher Education in Taiwan, guide international students applying to study in Taiwan, participate in overseas education exhibitions, offer Mandarin Chinese courses, and pursue opportunities for bilateral academic cooperation. Commissioned by the Ministry to promote the TECs, FICHET assists in the TECs’ development and informs Taiwan's higher education institutions joining the TECs’ functions and services, thereby encouraging institutions to utilize the TECs in forging their global partnerships and increasing worldwide visibility.

=== Taiwan Experience Education Program (TEEP) ===
Since 2015, the Ministry of Education of Taiwan has launched the Taiwan Experience Education Program (TEEP) to encourage international students to participate in short-term internship programs organized by Taiwan's universities and colleges. TEEP participants will be arranged in a lab, research unit, enterprise, or elementary/secondary school, and provided with opportunities to attend academic seminars, Mandarin learning courses, and cultural activities to enhance professional capabilities and connect with the academic or business market.

=== Executive Conference on International Affairs ===
Since 2007, the Foundation for International Cooperation in Higher Education has regularly held exchange meetings for international affairs managers of higher education institutions, established a platform for sharing international affairs experience, expanded the network of internationalized higher education communities, and strengthened the practical experience of universities through various main topics. It has also served as a reference for the government to promote the internationalization of higher education. Over the years, topics discussed have included higher education international competitiveness and innovative research and development, Mandarin Chinese learning and overseas enrollment, international cooperation in higher education, current situation and international trends in vocational education, higher education international legal systems and environments, overseas students graduating and staying in Taiwan, global internships, and other topics, attracting over 100 international affairs managers or senior administrators from home and abroad to participate in the meetings.

=== International Administrator Training Project ===
To assist higher education institutions in Taiwan in cultivating the professional competence of international affairs staff, and to continue the legacy and exchange of experience in business operations to benefit the development of the internationalization of higher education in universities and colleges of Taiwan, the Foundation holds relevant activities regularly each year to strengthen the professional competence of international affairs administrators. These include workshops, seminars and conferences, training courses, etc., to establish an international exchange platform for Taiwan's higher education institutions, and to collaborate with relevant academic institutions and professionals abroad to share the experiences, knowledge, or professional training.

=== Taiwan Mandarin Educational Resources Center ===
The Ministry of Education in Taiwan established the "Office of Global Mandarin Education" in 2016 to integrate relevant educational resources, expand the attraction of overseas students to Taiwan to learn Mandarin, and build an international education brand in order to promote Mandarin language policy. The office was renamed as the "Taiwan Mandarin Educational Resources Center" in 2021, which promotes teacher training, teaching system implementation, digital research and development, international marketing, and industry-university cooperation. Starting from August 2022, these tasks are executed by the FICHET.

== List of Chairpersons ==
Term	Name	Took office	Left office	Note
01	Flora Chia-I Chang	2005	June, 2006	President of the Tamkang University
02	Si-Chen Lee	July, 2006	June, 2009	President of the National Taiwan University
03	Flora Chia-I Chang	July, 2009	June, 2012	President of the Tamkang University
04	Flora Chia-I Chang	July, 2012	June, 2015	President of the Tamkang University
05	Huey-Jen Jenny Su	July, 2015	June, 2018	President of the National Cheng Kung University
06	Huey-Jen Jenny Su	July, 2018	June, 2021	President of the National Cheng Kung University
07	Huey-Jen Jenny Su	July, 2021	January, 2023	President of the National Cheng Kung University
07	Cheng-Chih Wu	February, 2023	June, 2025	President of the National Taiwan Normal University
08	Tsai-Yen Li	July, 2025	June, 2029	President of the National Chengchi University
