= Proton Saga (first generation) =

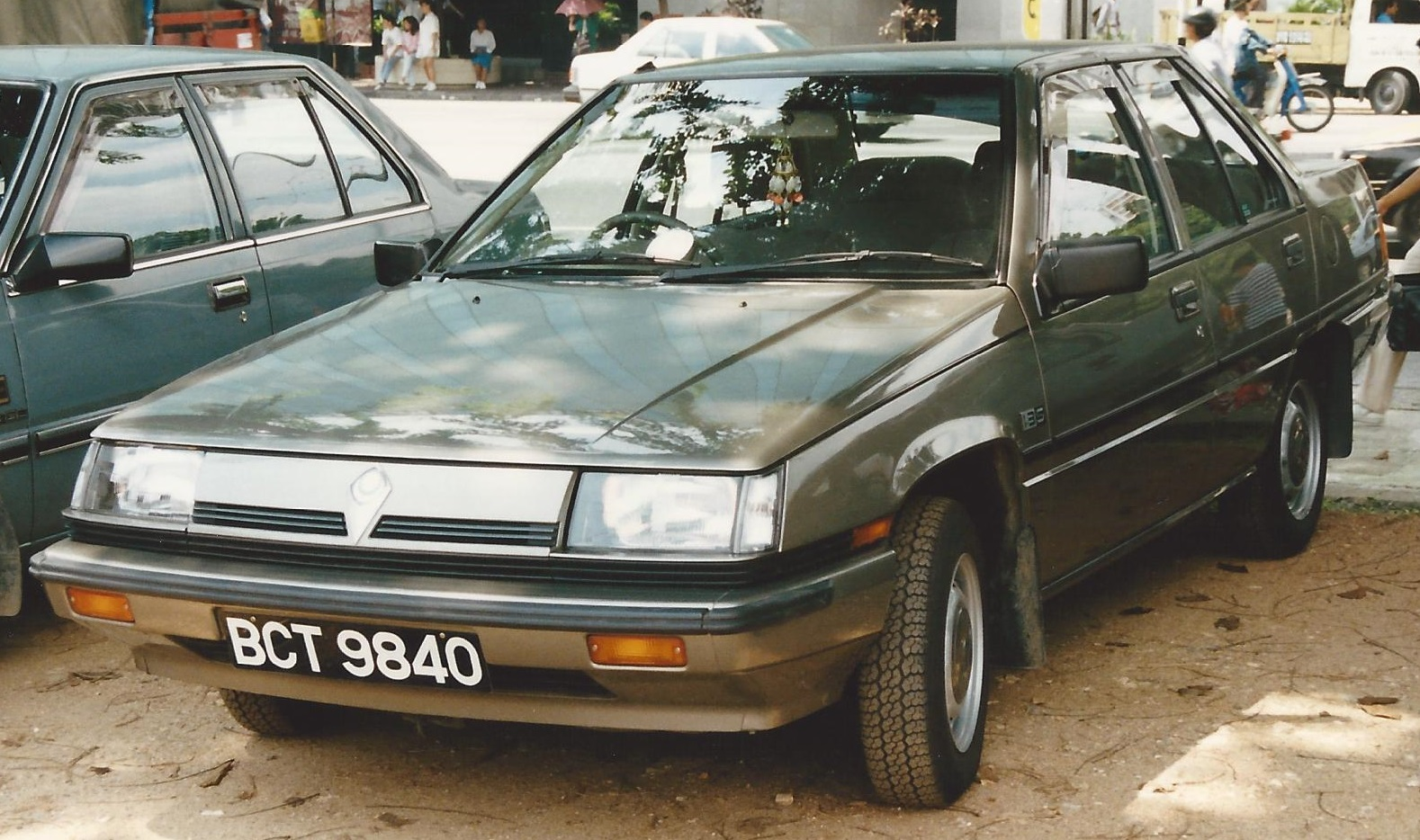

Overview
- Also called: Proton Saga Aeroback (hatchback); Proton 1.3 / 1.5 (UK); Proton 12-Valve (UK)
- Production: 1985–2008
- Assembly: Malaysia: Shah Alam (PONSB, hub); Shah Alam (AMIM, Iswara only); Pekan (AMM, Iswara only)

Body and chassis
- Class: B-segment
- Body style: 4-door saloon 5-door hatchback
- Layout: FF
- Related: Mitsubishi Lancer Fiore/Mirage/Colt (second generation); Hyundai Excel; Dodge/Plymouth Colt (fifth generation); Eagle Vista

Powertrain
- Transmission: 5-speed manual 3-speed automatic

Chronology
- Successor: Proton Saga (second generation)

The first generation Proton Saga was the first automobile produced by Malaysian automobile manufacturer Proton. It was based on the 1983 Mitsubishi Lancer Fiore as a result of a joint venture between HICOM and Mitsubishi. The Proton Saga was officially launched on 9 July 1985 by the fourth prime minister, Dr. Mahathir Mohamad. It was produced in both 4-door saloon and 5-door hatchback styles.

The first generation Proton Saga was the longest produced Proton model, having been in production for over 22 consecutive years until it was finally succeeded by the second generation Saga in early 2008. A total of 1.9 million units of the Saga have been sold as of 2022, of which 1.2 million units of the first generation Proton Saga were sold, making it Proton's most successful offering to date.

== History ==
The concept of a 'Malaysian car' was conceived in 1979 by Mahathir Mohamad, then Minister of Trade and Industry. Mahathir actively encouraged the development of heavy industries in Malaysia as part of a long-term vision for self-sufficiency and progress.

The automotive industry in Malaysia was established in the late 1960s. Six automobile assembly plants were set up to assemble cars with complete knock-down (CKD) kits imported from various car companies from Europe, America, Japan and Australia. However, inadequate economies of scale and local content regulations drove up prices of new cars in Malaysia over the course of the 1970s, with most if not all locally assembled CKD models generally costing more to produce than an equivalent CBU import.

By the dawn of the 1980s, the Malaysian government concluded that direct involvement was necessary to reverse losses and spur future industrial growth. Mahathir Mohamad became the fourth Prime Minister of Malaysia in July 1981. The National Car Project was approved in 1982, with the objective of accelerating technology transfer, increasing and rationalising local content, and involving more Malay entrepreneurs in the then largely ethnic Chinese dominated Malaysian automotive industry.

Mahathir had invited Mitsubishi Motors to participate in the National Car Project. The decision to collaborate with a Japanese car company was part of Mahathir's 'Look East Policy'. By January 1983, Mitsubishi had prepared two prototypes in Japan, codenamed LM41 and LM44. On 7 May 1983, Perusahaan Otomobil Nasional (Proton) was established. HICOM held a 70% stake in Proton, while Mitsubishi Motors and Mitsubishi Corporation held 15% each.

== Proton Saga (1985–1992) ==
Proton Saga (C20, Mk1)
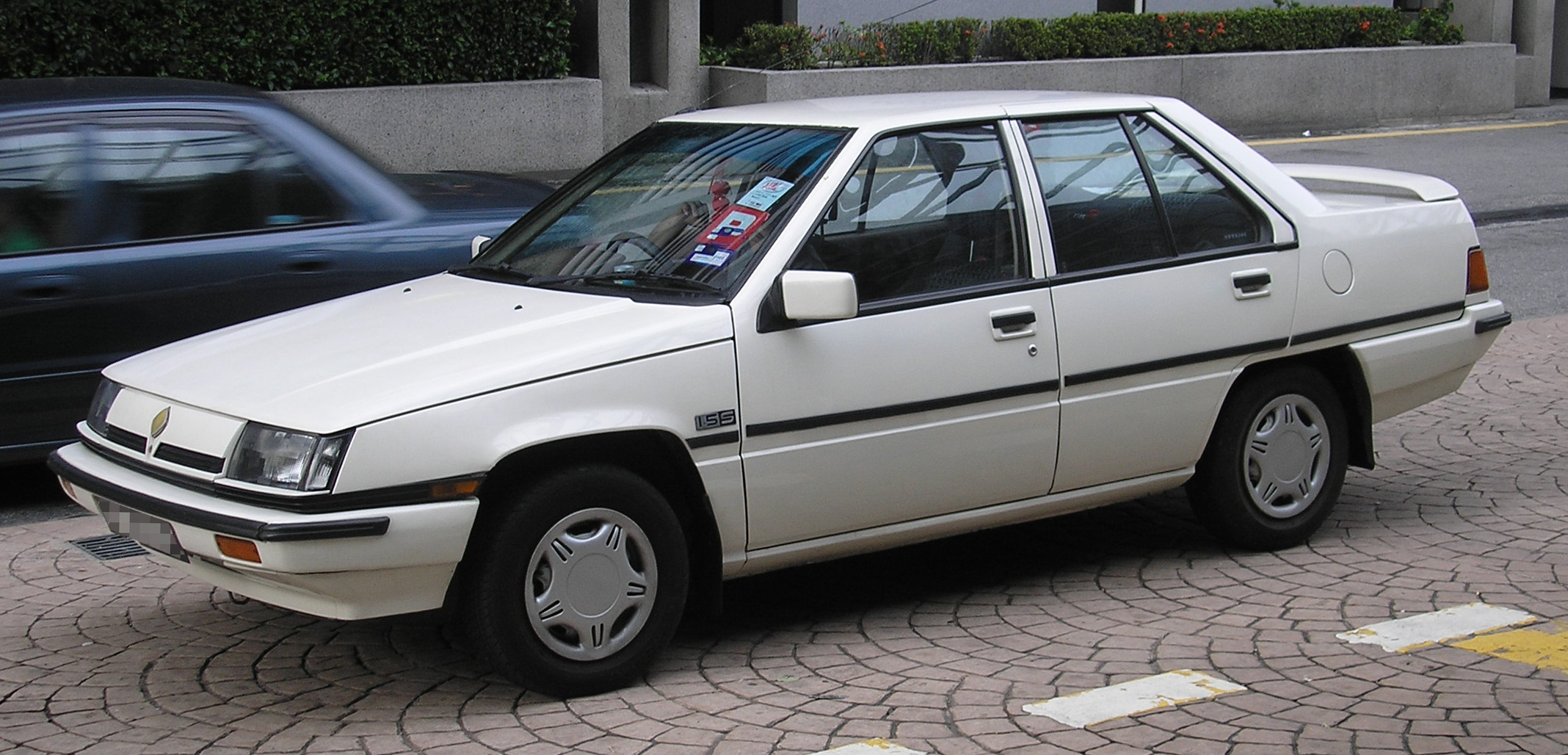

Overview
- Manufacturer: Proton
- Production: 1985–1992
- Designer: Halim Hassan

Powertrain
- Engine: 1.3 L 4G13 Orion II 8V SOHC I4; 1.3 L 4G13 Magma 8V SOHC I4; 1.3 L 4G13P Megavalve 12V SOHC I4; 1.5 L 4G15 Orion II 8V SOHC I4; 1.5 L 4G15 Magma 8V SOHC I4; 1.5 L 4G15P Megavalve 12V SOHC I4

Dimensions
- Wheelbase: 2,380 mm (93.7 in)
- Length: 4,311 mm (169.7 in) (saloon)
- Width: 1,635 mm (64.4 in)
- Height: 1,360 mm (53.5 in)
- Kerb weight: 980 kg (2,161 lb)

The Proton Saga was launched on 9 July 1985. It is based on the 1983 Mitsubishi Lancer Fiore platform, and powered by the 1.3-litre 4G13 or 1.5-litre 4G15 Orion II engines. The first known Proton Saga to roll off the production line in Shah Alam is preserved at the Muzium Negara as a symbol of the beginning of the Malaysian automotive industry. The Saga quickly became a national symbol of Malaysia, and Mahathir drove a prototype Proton Saga fitted with a 2.0-litre Mitsubishi Sirius 4G63 engine and a Jalur Gemilang across the Penang Bridge during its opening ceremony on 14 September 1985.

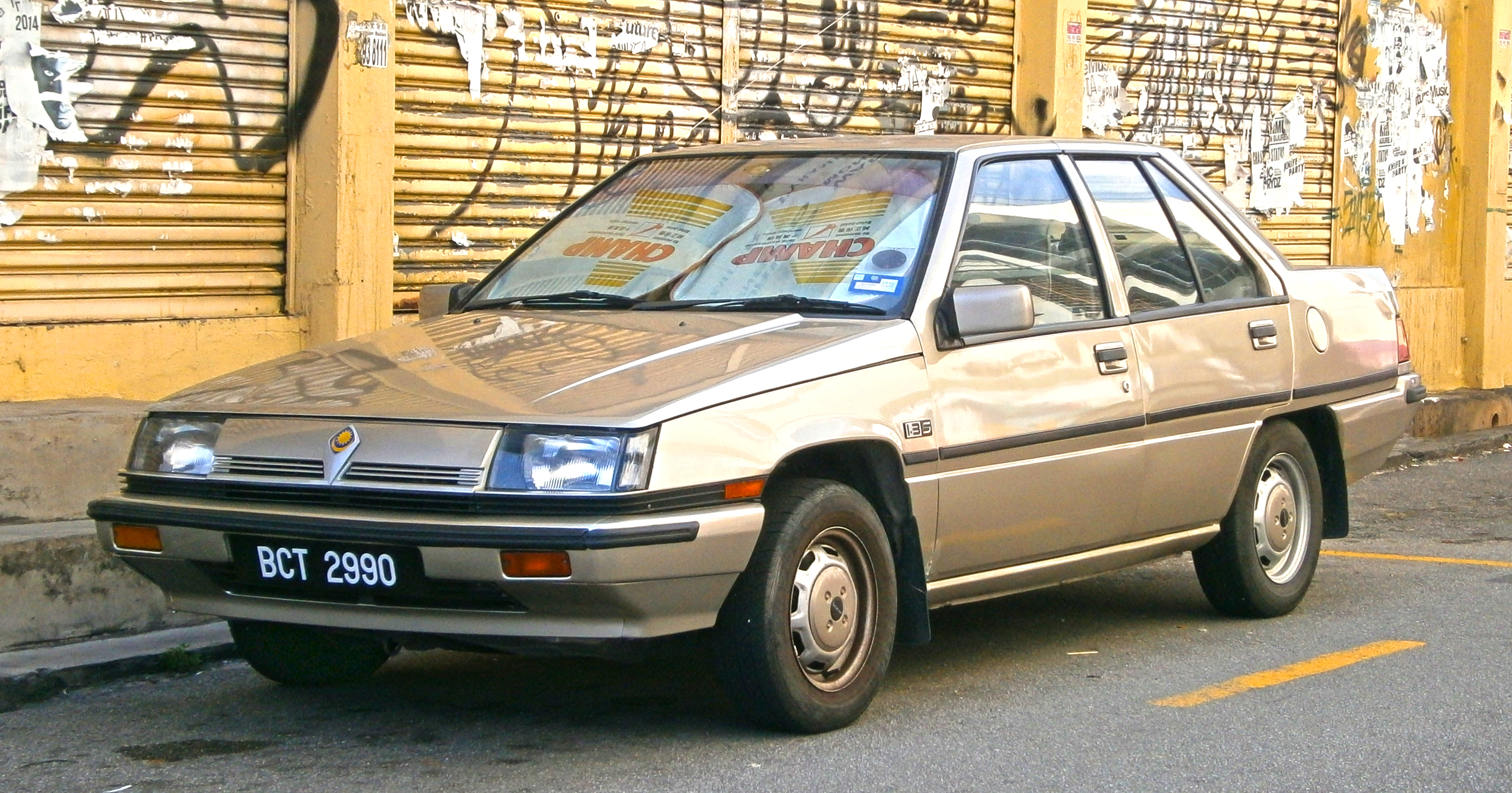
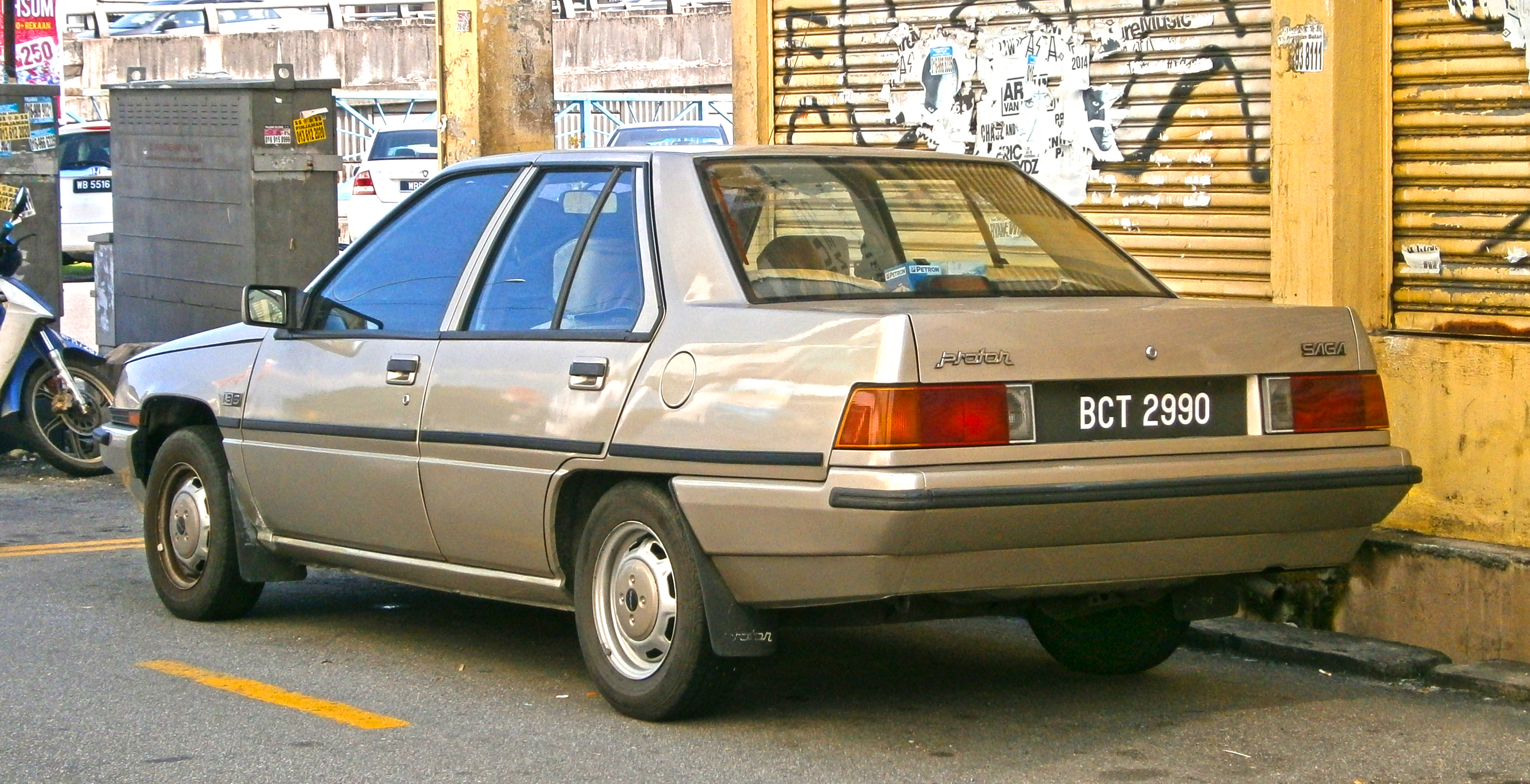
1987–1990 Proton Saga (Magma) saloon

Initially, Saga supplies were low, with just 700 vehicles produced in time for the launch. The cars sold quickly, and Proton was unable to meet public demand. However, by mid-1986, the Saga had captured a 64% domestic market share in the Below 1600cc segment. Proton first ventured into export markets in 1986, with Bangladesh receiving the Proton Saga on 26 December 1986, followed by New Zealand, Brunei, Malta and Sri Lanka in 1987. The 10,000th Saga was also produced in 1986.

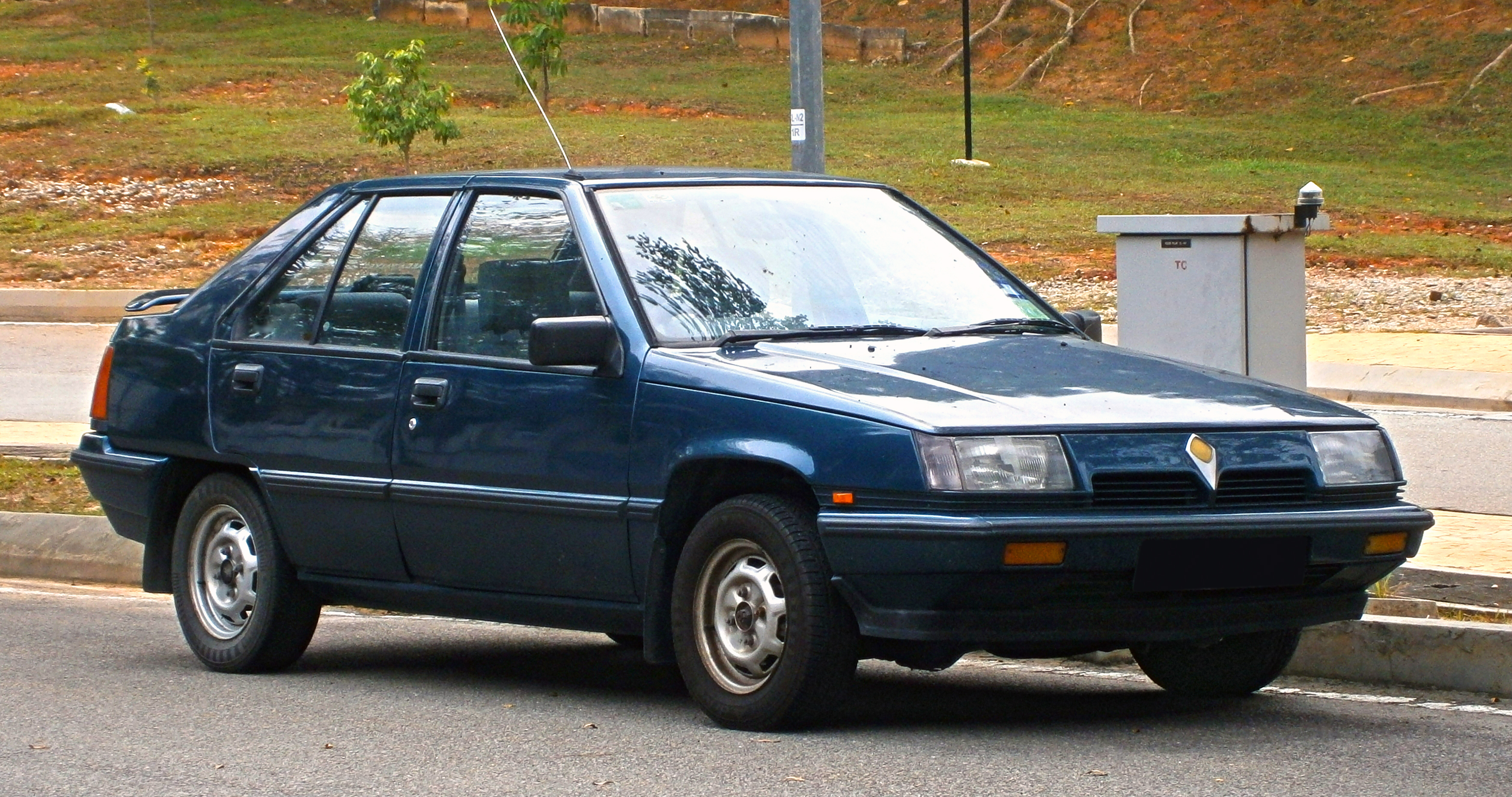
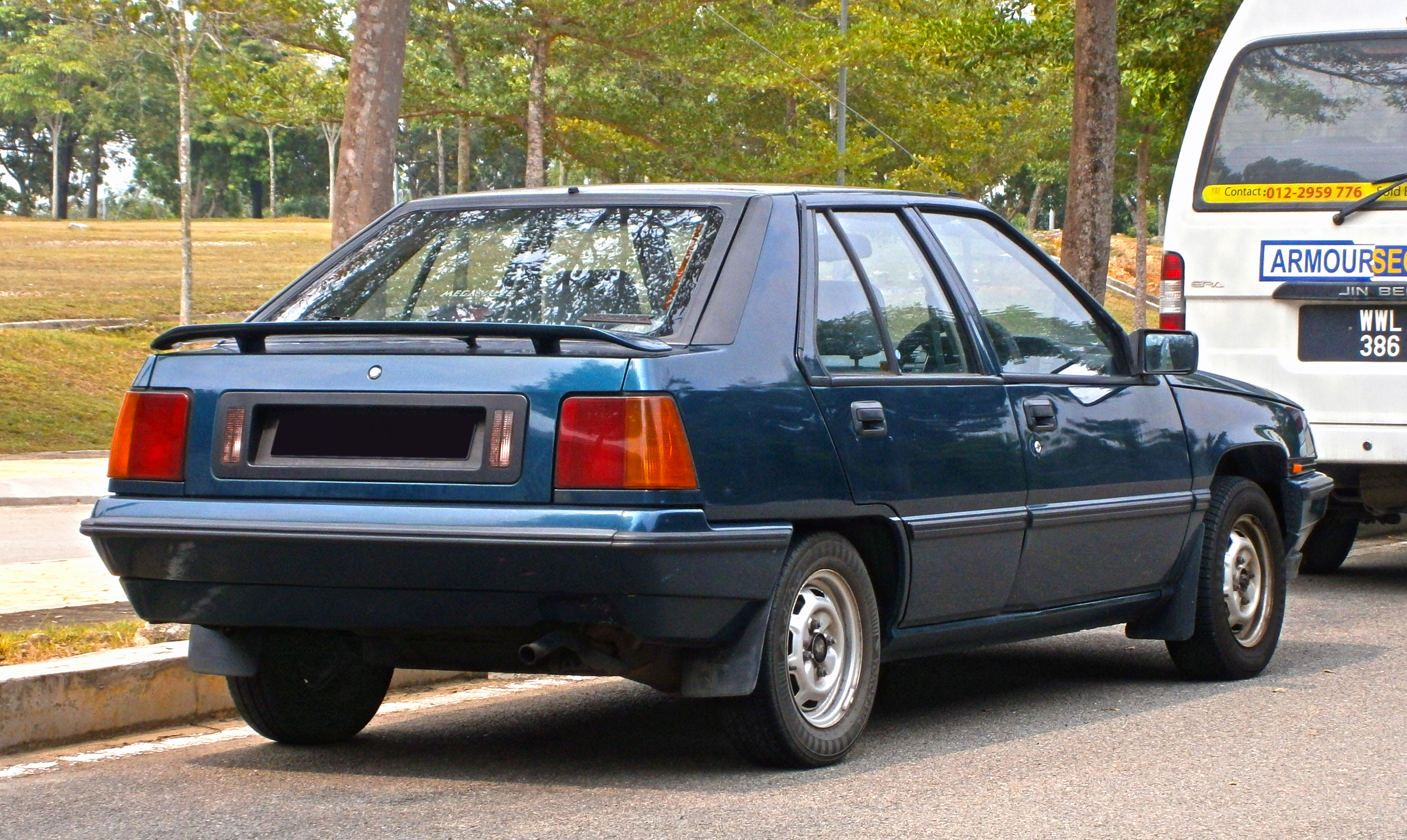
1990–1992 Proton Saga (Megavalve) Aeroback

Proton attempted to sell the Saga in the United States with the help of American automotive entrepreneur Malcolm Bricklin. Mahathir had been impressed by Bricklin, who was advised to work with Proton on orders from the former U.S. Secretary of State, Henry Kissinger, who had previously taught Mahathir at Harvard University. Sales were expected to begin in October 1988 Soon after the first Sagas were imported into the United States, Bricklin revealed that he had not gained importation approval from the authorities and that the Saga didn't pass emissions testing. This resulted in the termination of all investments between the involved parties and proved a major financial loss for Proton. The attempt to export the Saga to the United States angered Mitsubishi; it is believed that they intervened to sink the Bricklin deal as they didn't want a lower-priced, lower quality clone of one of their own vehicles as a competitor in what was then considered the world's most important car market. Mitsubishi subsequently fired all of Proton's management and replaced them with Japanese executives who clamped down on Proton's export initiatives.

In January 1987, the Proton Saga 1.5I (for Istimewa, Malay for special) saloon was introduced as the range-topping variant. Additional equipment included power steering, front electric windows, electrically adjustable wing mirrors, central locking, and driver's seat height adjustment. Exterior styling changes included full-wheel covers, black painted lower bumpers, and black cladding on the sills and lower part of the doors. A three-speed automatic transmissions was available as an option.

Later in October 1987, a hatchback variant called the Proton Saga Aeroback was launched. It shared the same 1.5 L engine found in the saloon variant, but featured a redesigned rear end which is unique to Proton. 1987 also witnessed the production of the 50,000th Saga.

The Proton Saga Magma was introduced in mid-1987, offering mild mechanical and cosmetic upgrades. The Magma suffix denotes the updated engine, and the Magma-powered Saga can be differentiated from the original Orion II-powered models by its slightly different front grille design and the inclusion of bumper protector mouldings.

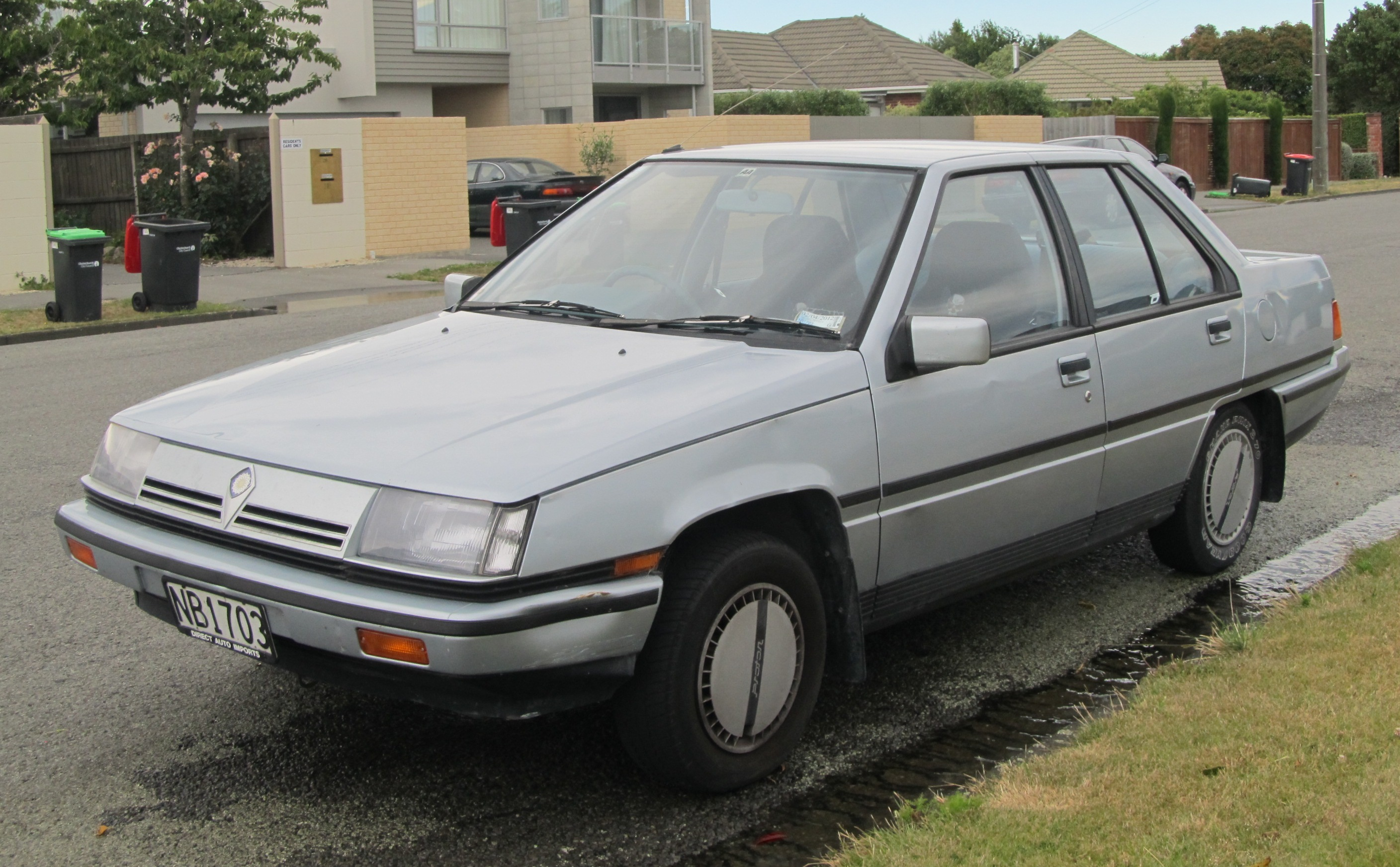
1987 Proton Saga 1.5 GLX Saloon (New Zealand)

The Proton Saga made its European debut on 11 March 1988 with its launch in Ireland. Both saloon and hatchback models were made available at a cost of between £8,999 and £10,799. Proton managed to launch the Saga in Ireland before the United Kingdom as only minimal changes and modifications were necessary to pass Irish automotive and safety regulations. Additionally, the Irish automotive market was small at around 50,000 units a year at that period, as opposed to the much larger U.K. market at 2 million units. Proton launched the Saga in several small Commonwealth countries while they prepared for their large scale launch in the U.K. with over 100 dealers. In October 1988, the Proton Saga made its English debut at the 1988 British International Motorshow, where it won three Prestigious Awards (two gold medals and one silver) for quality coachwork and ergonomics. The Saga was also voted among the Top 10 best cars at the show. 1988 witnessed Proton's entry into the Jamaican market, along with the 100,000th Saga produced.

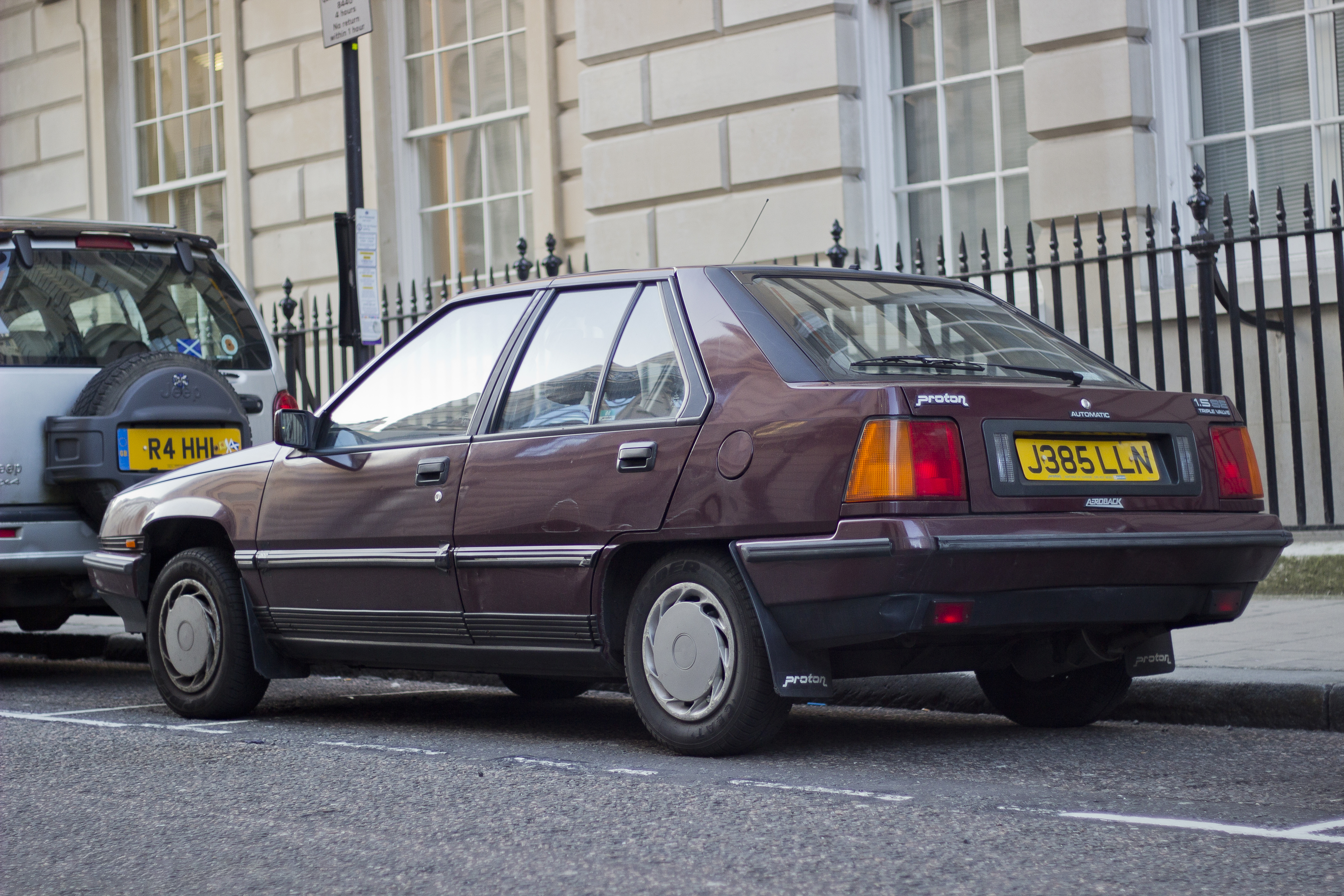
1991 Proton 1.5 SE Aeroback (United Kingdom)

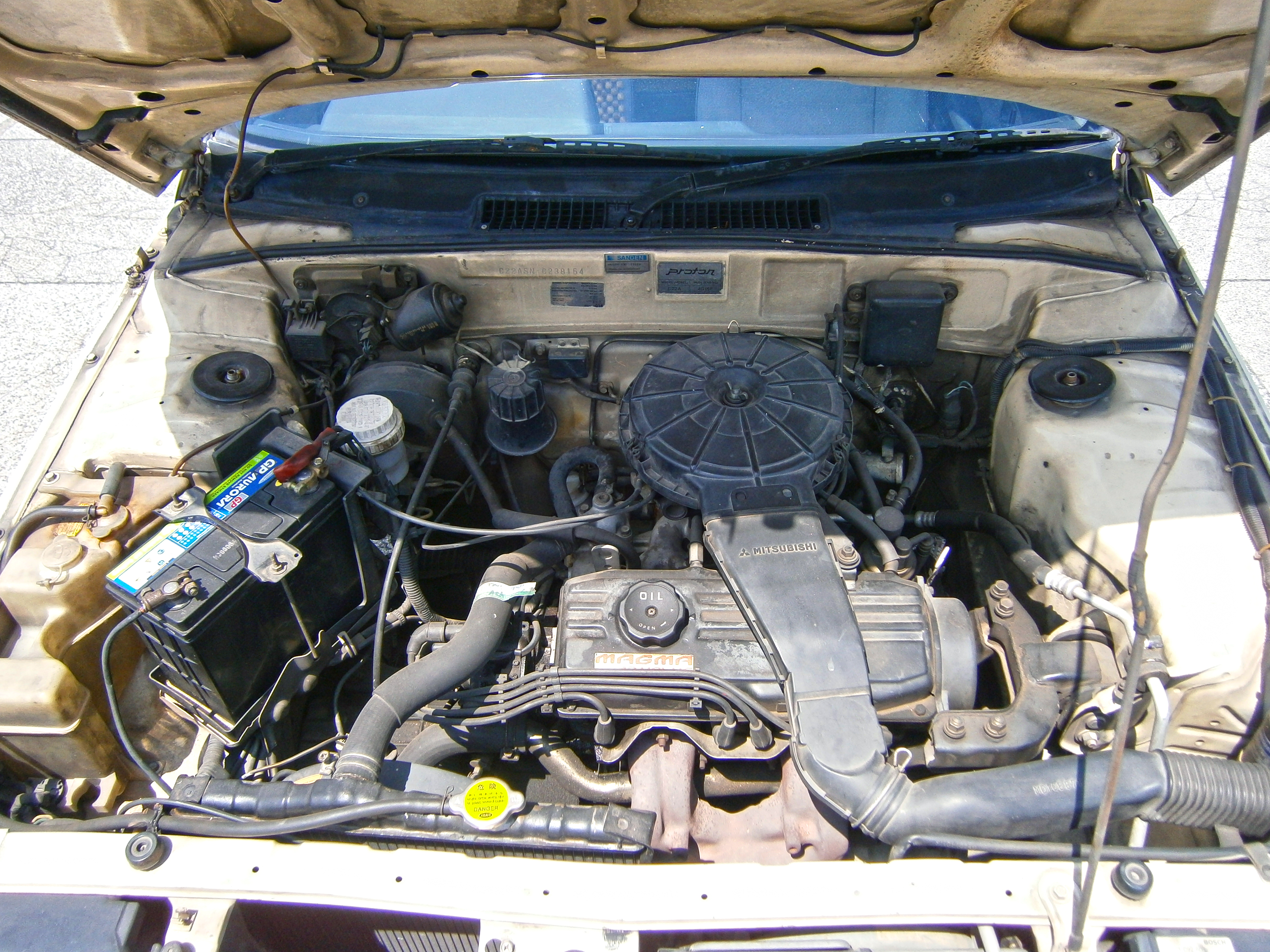
The 12-valve Megavalve 4G15P engine

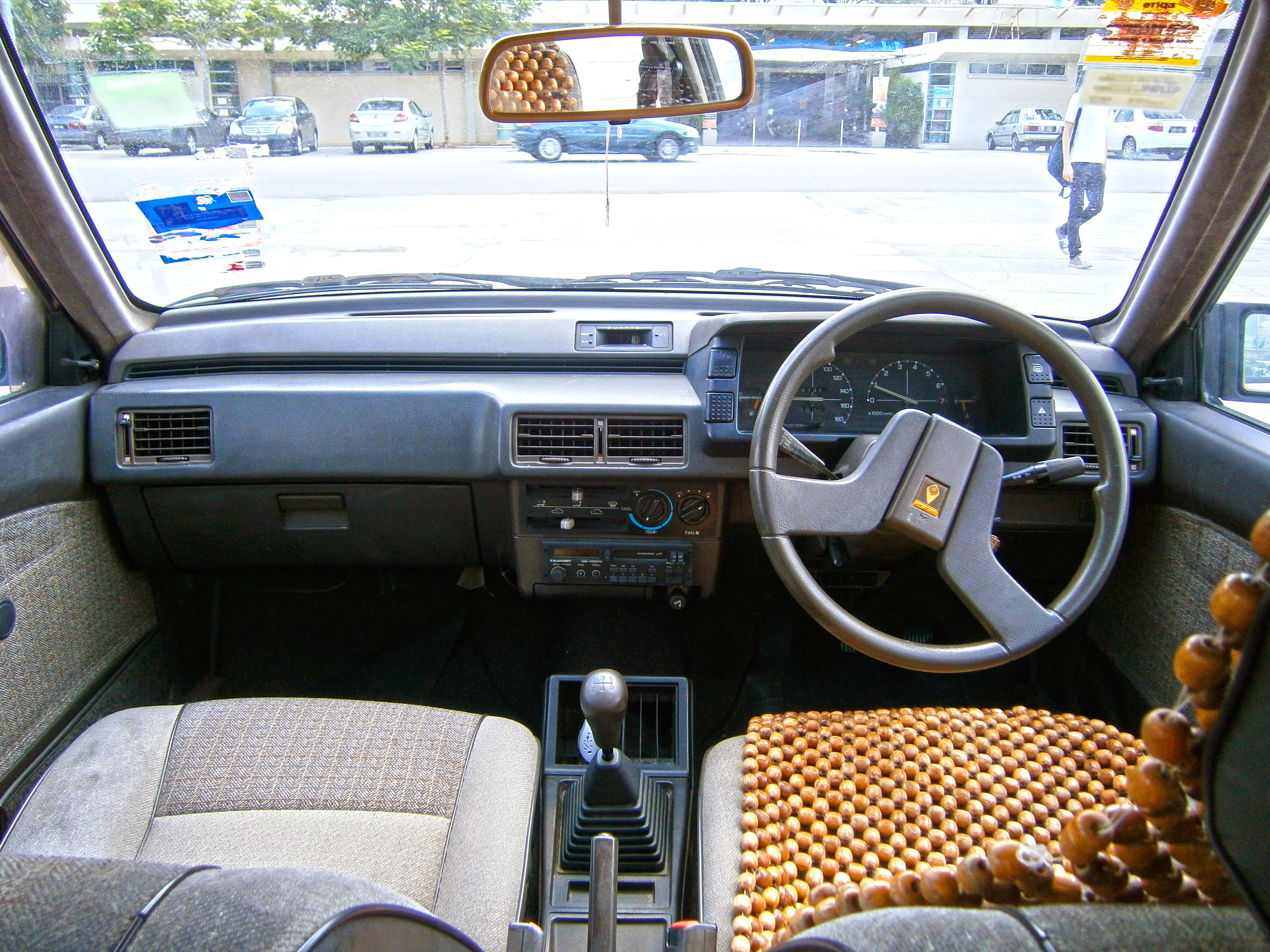
1990–1992 Proton Saga (Megavalve) interior

In the Malaysian market, an exclusive performance variant known as Proton Knight was introduced on 8 March 1989. It was only available in one shade of color called majorca black with the Aeroback body style, featuring a 1.5L 8V Magma engine and a 5-speed manual transmission. This sporty Saga variant was only produced for a single year, which made it one of the rarest Saga models ever made. A similar performance variant known as Proton Saga Black Knight Edition was launched solely in the United Kingdom in the saloon body style with only 201 units ever produced in the same year.

On 16 March 1989, Proton officially launched the Saga saloon and hatchback duo in the United Kingdom. The saloon models were renamed Proton 1.3 and Proton 1.5 respectively according to their engine displacement in addition to a suffix such as S.E. or G.L. which denoted trim levels. The U.K.-market models also differed slightly from their Malaysian counterparts. All U.K.-market models were equipped with the original Mitsubishi Lancer Fiore dashboard and rear fog lights to pass U.K. safety regulations. Britain also received many limited edition models such as the Proton Puma, Lynx, Emerald, Prism and SE Le Mans, which featured higher trim levels and unique equipment. Proton advertised their models with the slogan "Japanese Technology, Malaysian Style" in the United Kingdom. Proton later set the record for the 'Fastest selling make of new car ever to enter the United Kingdom', exceeding their 12-month sales target within 6 months. Prior to its launch, the Saga underwent a strict homologation process to be allowed entry and sale in the U.K. market. The process included various quality, safety and emissions tests and over 400 modifications where necessary, as well as a 1,000 mile-trial on British roads and weather conditions. The Saga also went on sale in Singapore in October 1989 under Cycle & Carriage distributorship.

On 12 August 1990, the Proton Saga Megavalve was launched in Malaysia. The Megavalve nameplate represents the third engine update after the Orion (1985–1987) and Magma (1987–1990). The Megavalve engines feature 12-valves or three valves per cylinder, which is an upgrade over the older 8-valve engines. The four additional valves made the new Megavalve engines between 11% and 15% more powerful than the previous Magma plants. The Megavalve engine was produced in both 1.3-litre and 1.5-litre configurations and both were fitted with carburettors. In addition to the updated engines, the Proton Saga Megavalve was also fitted with a new front grille, wrap-around bumper protector moulding and two new exterior colours, namely maroon and green, as well as several minor changes on the interior. The 1.5S model also received new full wheel covers, and Proton reintroduced the Saga Aeroback 1.5I model due to popular demand. Safety standards were also raised with the inclusion of rear seat belts and a third brake light as standard equipment. The Proton Saga Megavalve ranged from RM28,000 to RM36,000, or an increment of RM2,000 over the previous Proton Saga Magma range.

A unique limousine version of the Proton Saga was also produced. It is 25 percent longer than the regular Saga saloon, and features a built-in freezer, in-car entertainment system and a television. The 200,000th Saga rolled off the production line on 16 May 1990.

Proton launched the facelifted Proton 12-Valve in the United Kingdom on 10 January 1991. The power output from the 1.3 L engine was upped to 77 bhp and the 1.5 L offered 85 bhp. On 22 September 1991, the Proton Saga won two gold awards at the British International Motorshow for the second time. The Saga was also launched in Malawi in December 1991. By then Proton had managed to export 40,151 units, of which 33,291 were to the United Kingdom, with 3699, 1160 and 847 to Singapore, Ireland and New Zealand respectively. The 300,000th Saga was also produced in 1991, and locally manufactured Saga parts rose to 69% after the opening of the Engine and Transmission Factory in Shah Alam. Additionally, Fortune magazine ranked Proton as the 29th largest automobile company in the world in 1991 and 1992, a feat which was single-handedly achieved with the Saga, Proton's sole offering up to 1993.

== Proton Saga Iswara (1992–2003) ==
Proton Saga Iswara (C20, Mk2)
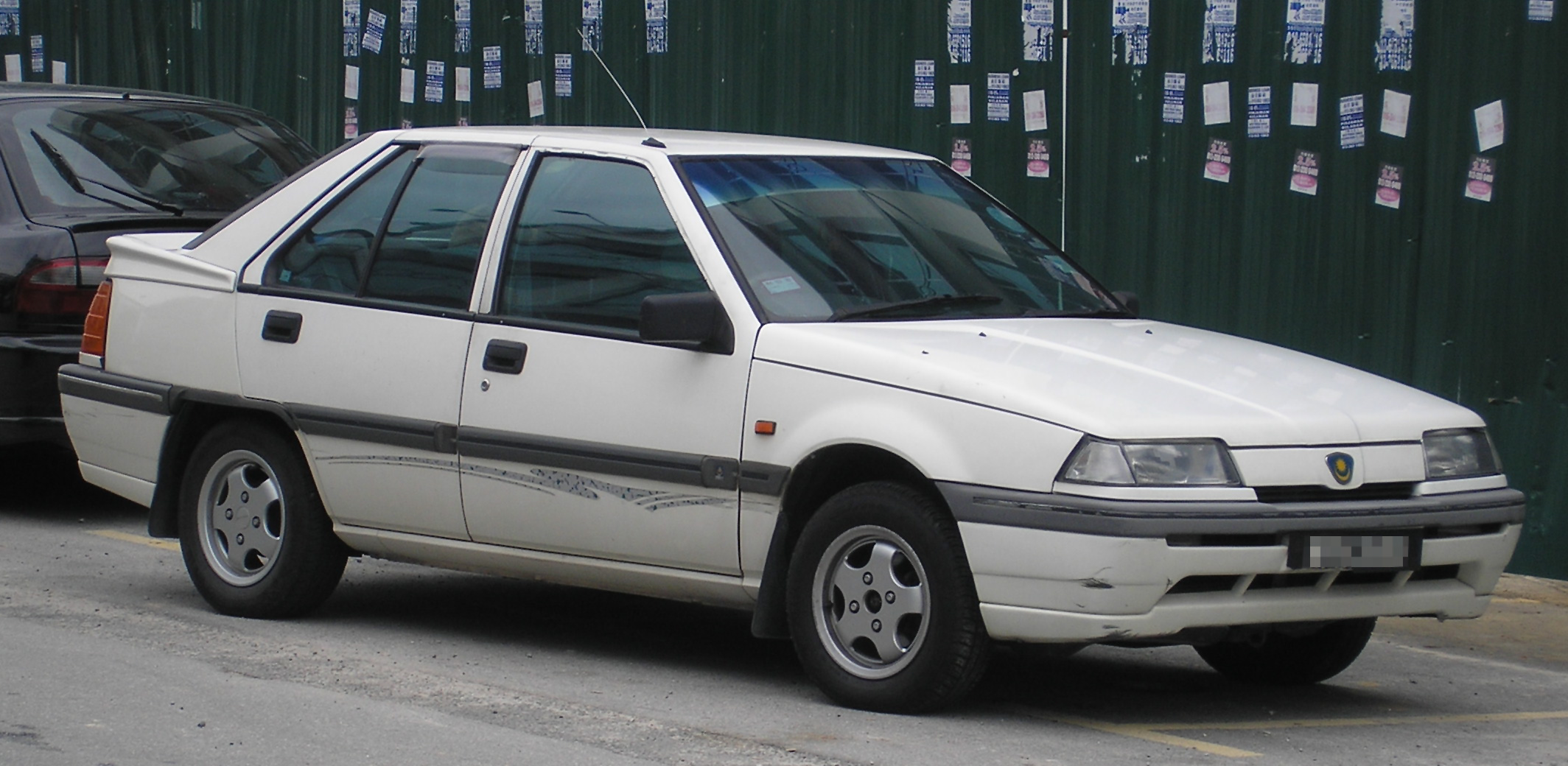

Overview
- Also called: Proton Saga Iswara Aeroback (hatchback); Proton Iswara; Proton Mpi (U.K.)
- Production: 1992–2003

Body and chassis
- Body style: 4-door saloon 5-door hatchback
- Layout: FF

Powertrain
- Engine: 1.3 L 4G13P 12V SOHC I4; 1.3 L 4G13P ECI Multi 12V SOHC I4; 1.5 L 4G15P 12V SOHC I4; 1.5 L 4G15P ECI Multi 12V SOHC I4
- Transmission: 5-speed manual 3-speed automatic

Dimensions
- Wheelbase: 2,380 mm (93.7 in)
- Length: 4,110 mm (161.8 in) (hatchback)
- Width: 1,655 mm (65.2 in)
- Height: 1,360 mm (53.5 in)
- Kerb weight: 970 kg (2,140 lb) (hatchback)

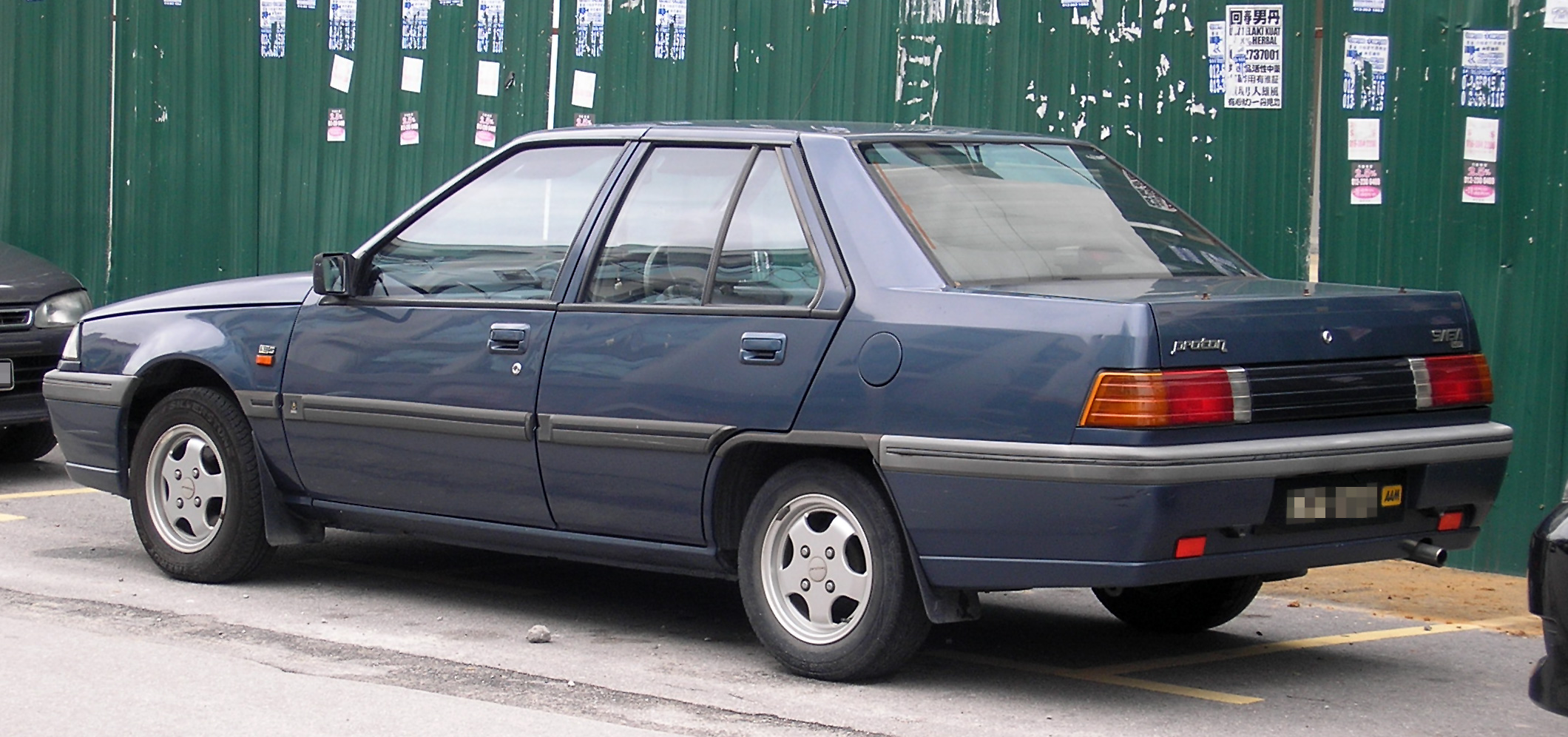
1992–2001 Proton Saga Iswara saloon

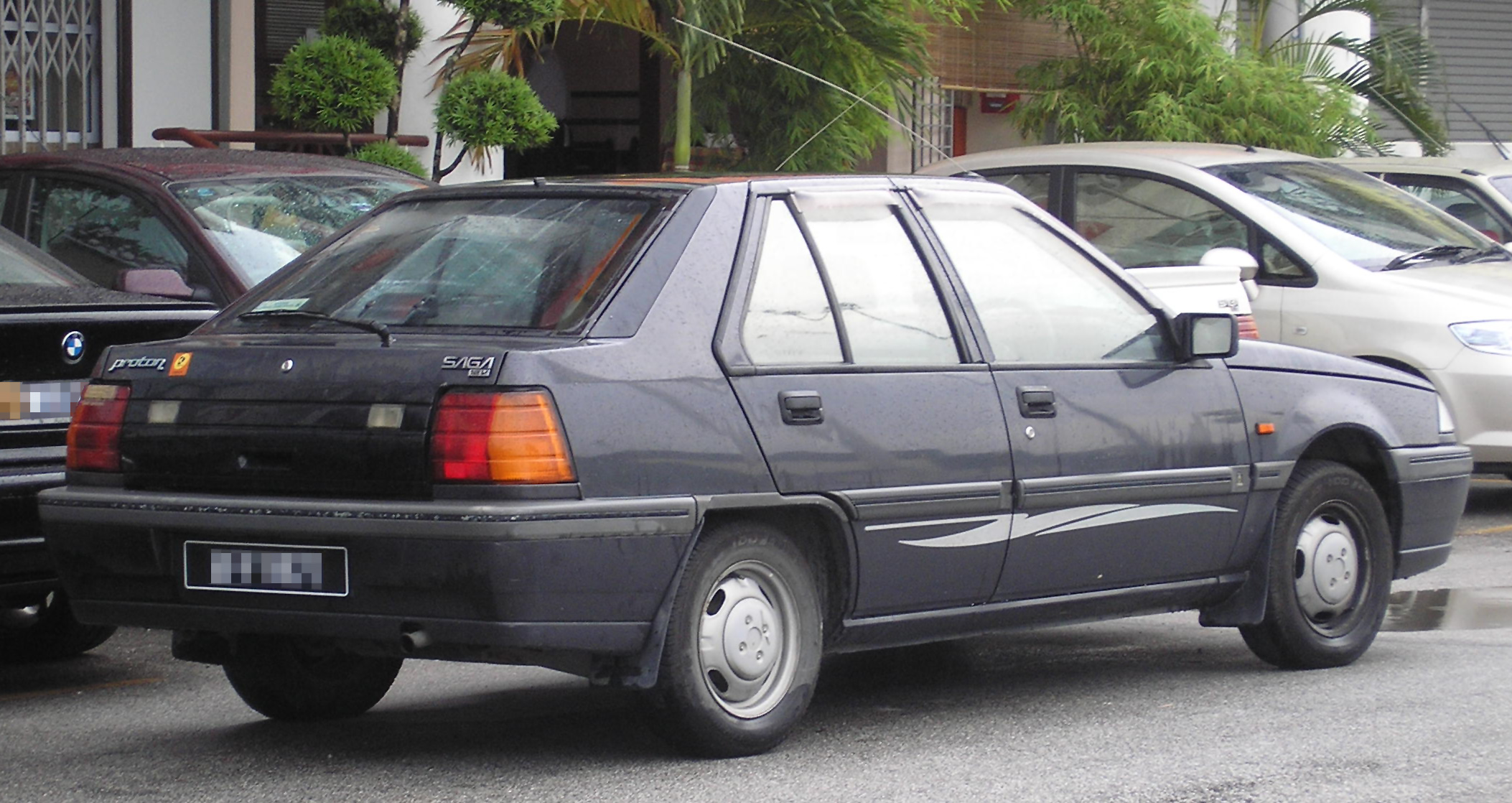
1992-2001 Proton Saga Iswara Aeroback

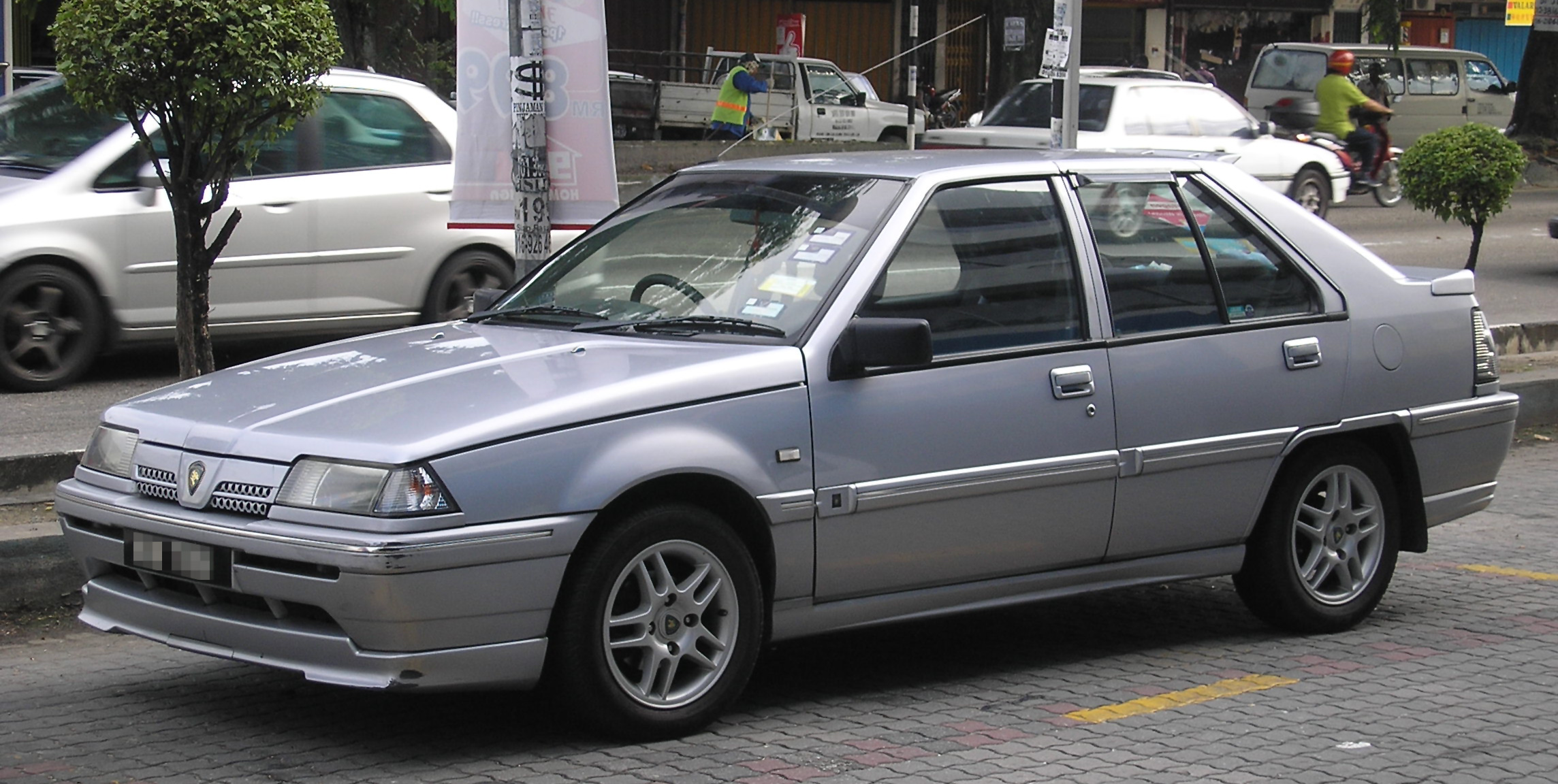
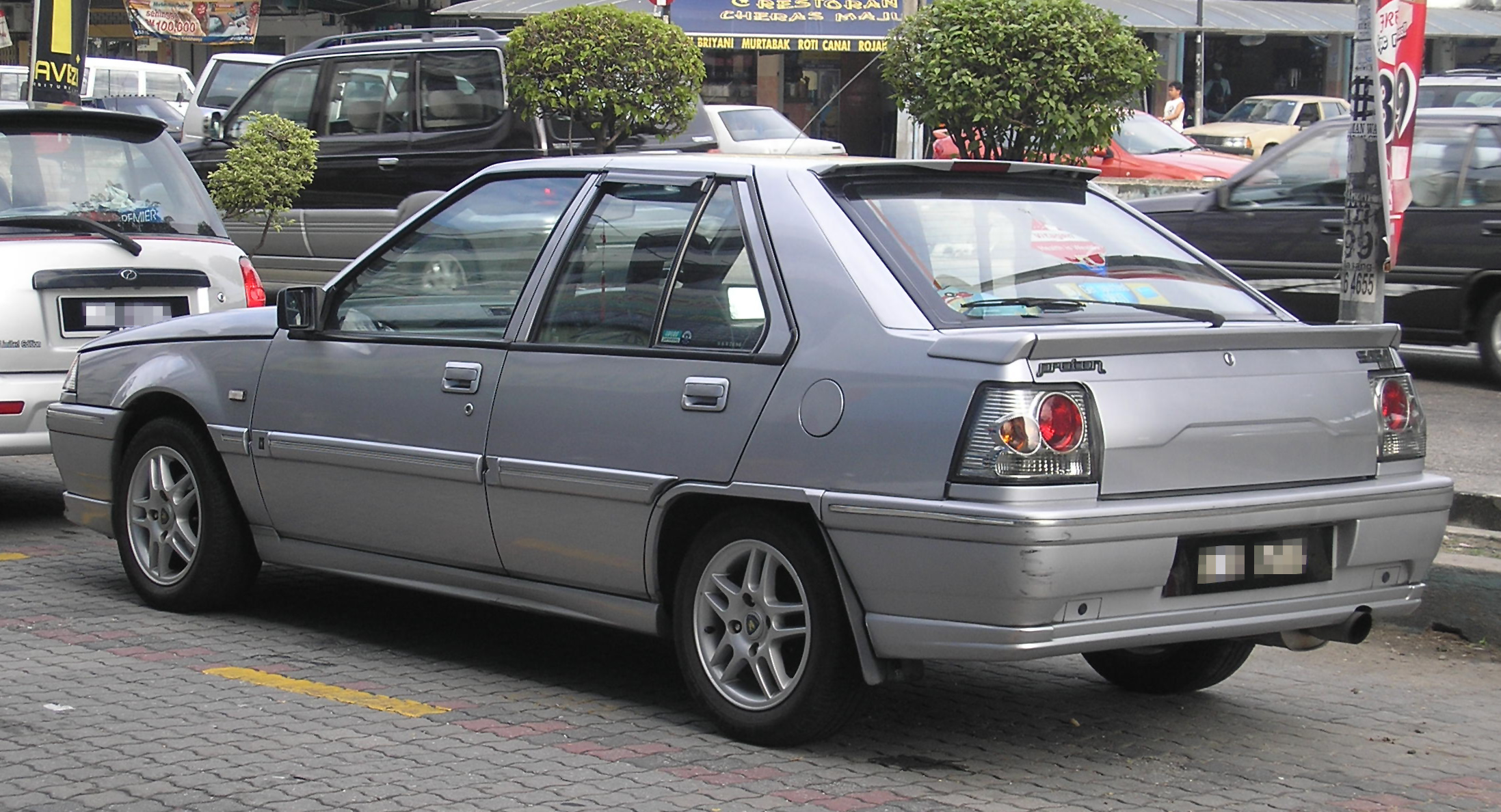
2001–2003 Proton Iswara Aeroback Special Edition hatchback

The Proton Saga Iswara (known as the Proton Mpi in the United Kingdom) was launched on 15 August 1992. It is named after the great Helen butterfly (Papilio iswara) of Sarawak. It was based on the outgoing Saga Megavalve platform. The exterior design was updated and restyled by a British firm. The Iswara features a new grille, slimmer headlights, grooved taillight clusters, plastic bumpers and side mouldings. Additionally, the rear license plate bracket was moved to the bumper instead of the boot. Like its predecessor, the Saga Iswara was produced in both 4-door saloon / sedan and 5-door hatchback guises, powered by the same 1.3-litre and 1.5-litre engines. However, models exported to Singapore and the United Kingdom were fitted with Mitsubishi's ECI Multi fuel injection system and a catalytic converter to meet Euro I emission standards. A five-speed manual and a three-speed automatic transmission were offered, both sourced from Mitsubishi. The saloon version of the Saga Iswara was widely used as taxis in Malaysia in the 1990s and 2000s. Most were converted to NGVs for greater fuel efficiency. Many Saga Iswara taxis are still in use today, but they are being phased out in favour of newer Proton taxis. UK sales ended in 1996, 3 years after the launch of the Persona.

A UK export variant of the Saga Iswara was also featured in an episode of the television show, Mr. Bean.

In 2001, Proton introduced the Iswara Aeroback Special Edition. It features a large number of cosmetic enhancements, including a new front grille, multi-surface reflector headlights, 'Altezza lights', body kit, rear lip spoilers and 14-inch alloy rims among others. It was only offered with the 1.3-litre engine paired to the 5-speed manual. The interior was left largely unchanged over the previous iteration. Nonetheless, the Iswara Aeroback S.E. is the first in its lineage to receive ride & handling input from Lotus. The modifications were later adopted for use in the Proton Saga LMST.

== Proton Saga LMST (2003–2008) ==
Proton Saga LMST (C20, Mk3)
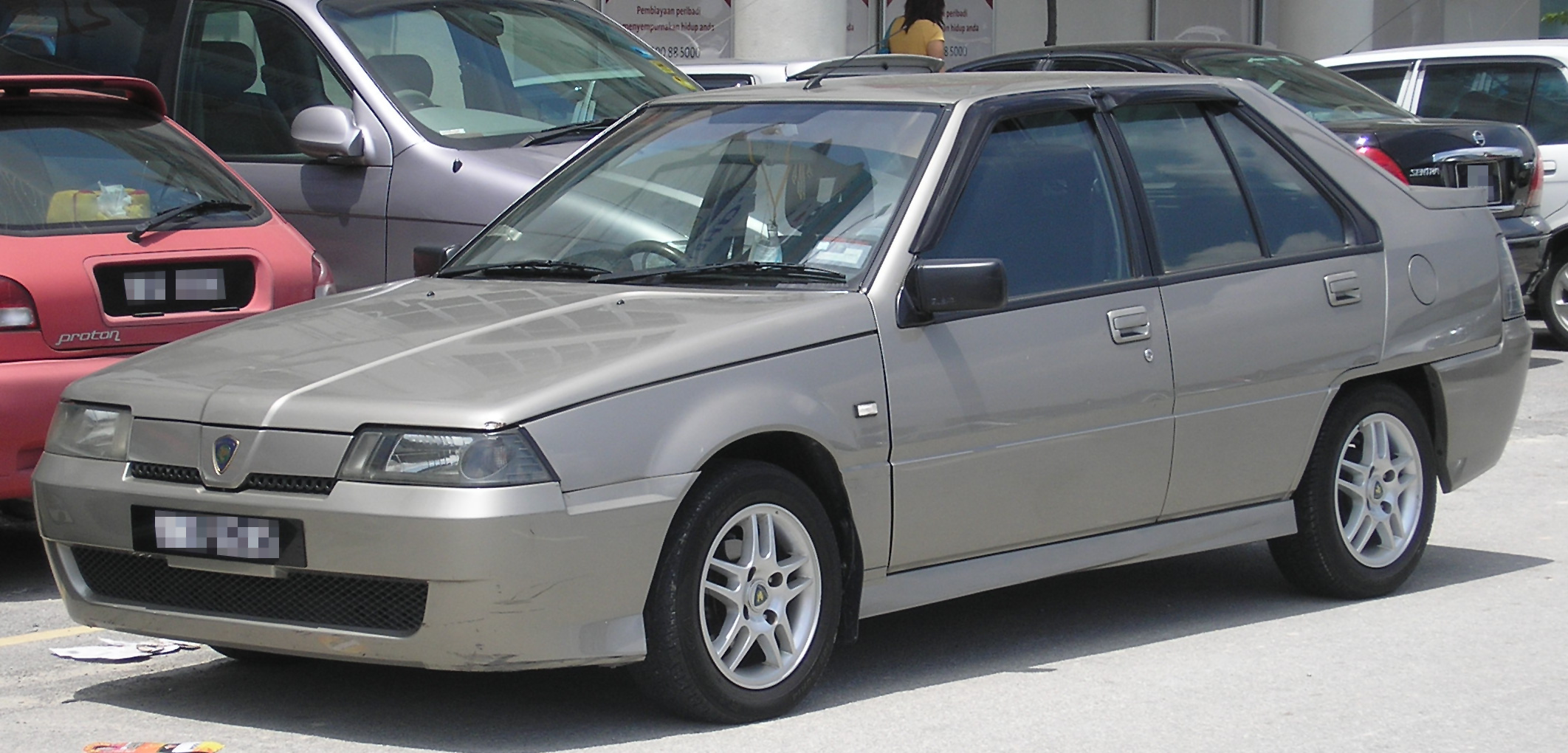

Overview
- Also called: Proton Saga
- Production: 2003–2008

Body and chassis
- Body style: 5-door hatchback
- Layout: FF

Powertrain
- Engine: 1.3 L 4G13P 12V SOHC I4
- Transmission: 5-speed manual

Dimensions
- Wheelbase: 2,380 mm (93.7 in)
- Length: 4,048 mm (159.4 in)
- Width: 1,626 mm (64.0 in)
- Height: 1,346 mm (53.0 in)
- Kerb weight: 960–970 kg (2,120–2,140 lb)

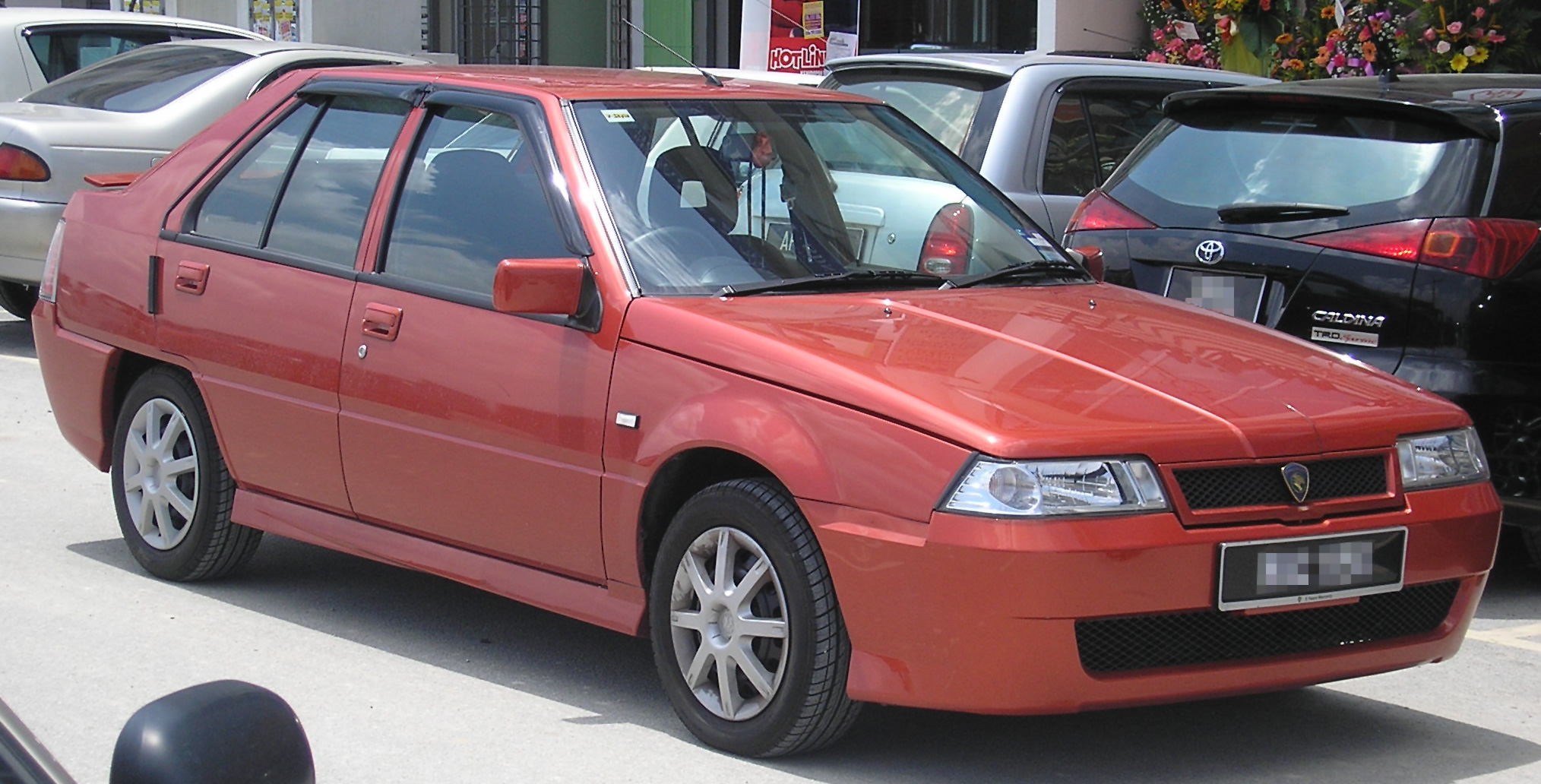
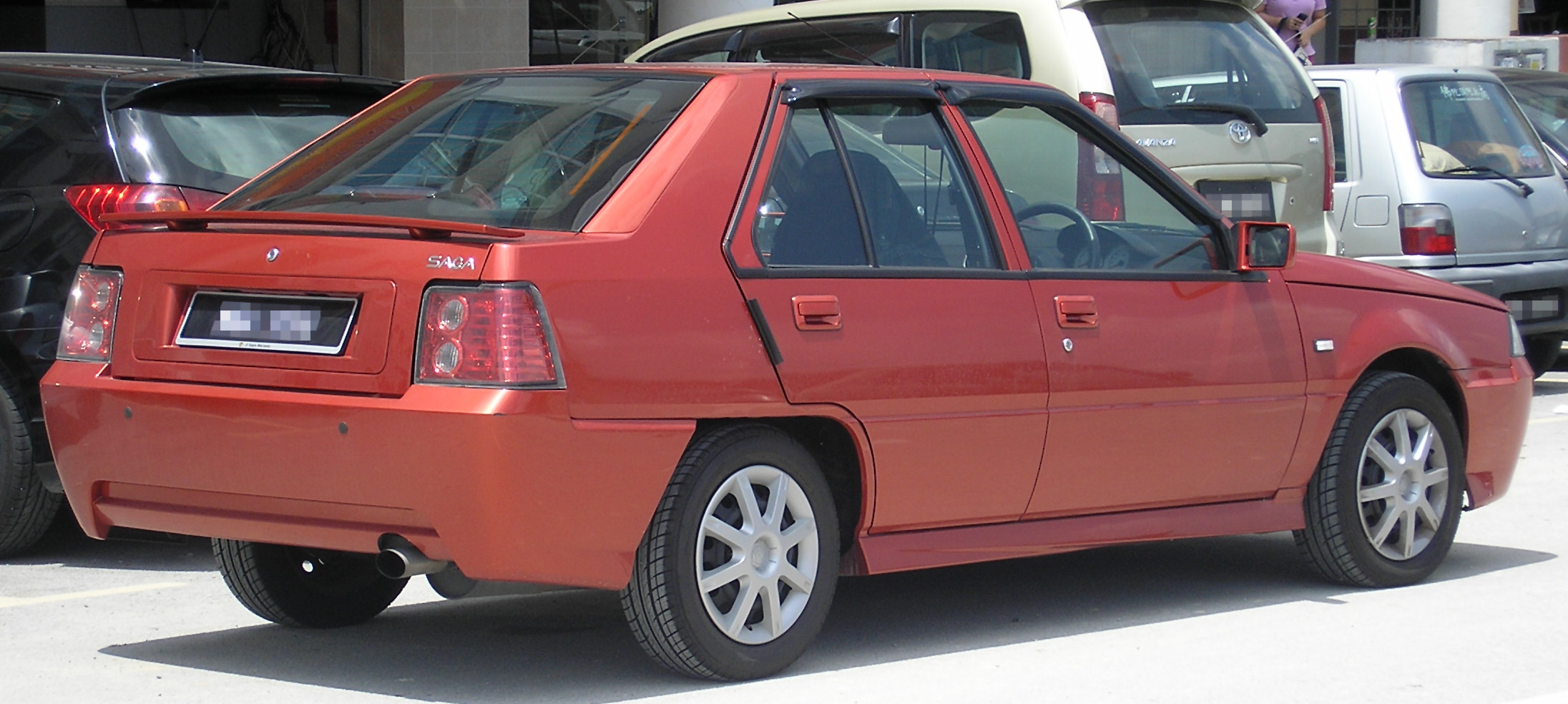
2006–2008 Proton Saga LMST hatchback
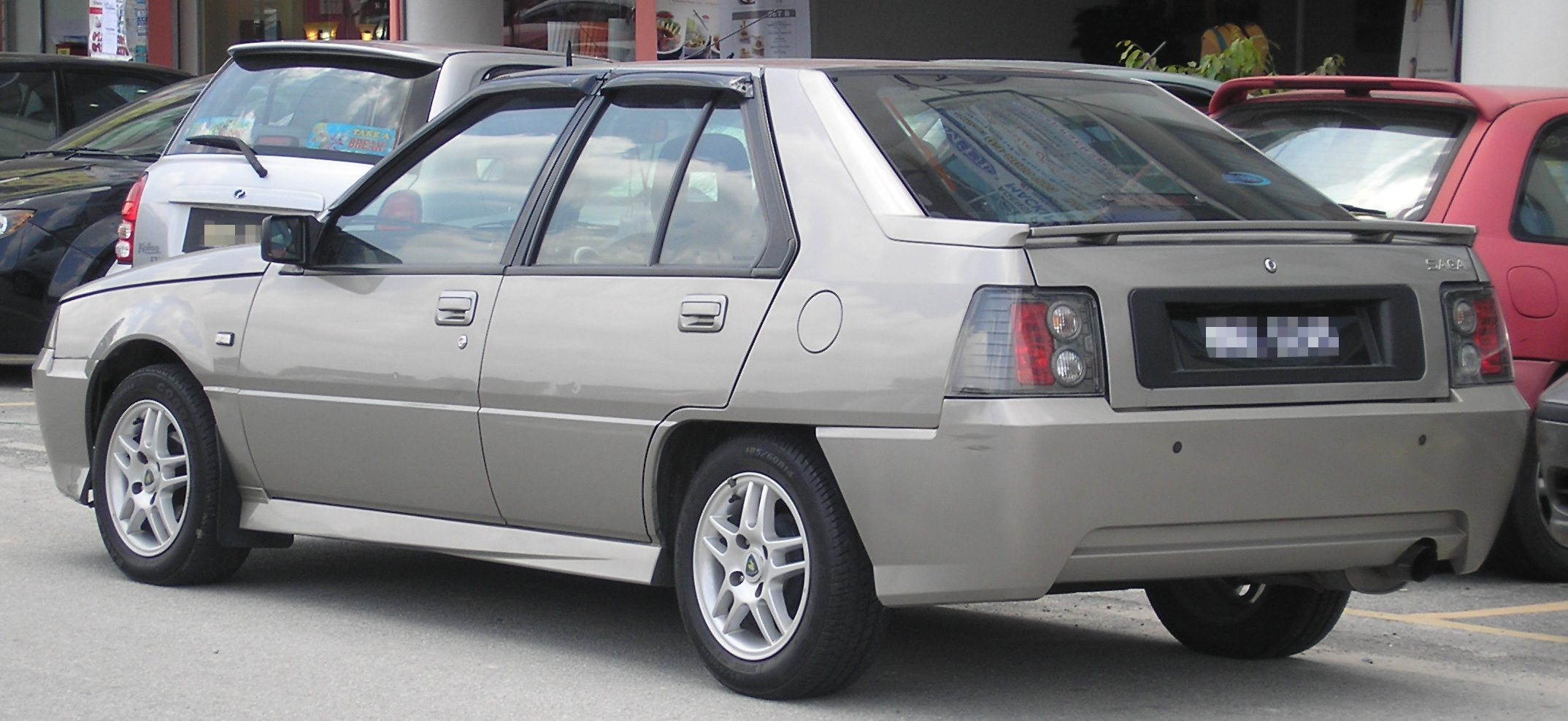
2003–2006 Proton Saga LMST hatchback

The Proton Saga Lotus Meter Saga Trim (LMST), hatchback was introduced in 2003 as the successor to the Proton Saga Iswara. Despite sharing the same, aging platform with the original Proton Saga from 1985, the Saga LMST featured a completely redesigned interior, with a new dashboard, instrument panel and meter cluster which offered a digital display consisting of an odometer, a fuel gauge and a temperature gauge. The steering wheel, gear stick and two-tone, red-on-black interior panels were also new. On the exterior, the car received a new front grille, headlights with integrated indicators, tail lights, front & rear bumpers, side skirts and a rear spoiler. The rear number plate bracket was also repositioned to the boot, and the rear bumper on later variants featured parking sensors, a first in the Saga lineage. The car came with the same 1.3L 4G13 engine, offering 83 bhp (62 kW) at 6,000rpm and 109Nm of torque at 4,000rpm. The 3-speed automatic was discontinued, and only the 5-speed manual transmission was offered. The Saga LMST was sold in two trim lines, one with power steering and one without, as well as an option for the 14-inch alloy rims from the Iswara S.E. The brakes were discs at the front and drums at the rear. The LMST was not equipped with airbags or ABS, and was sold in four colours; red, dark blue, grey and black.

In late 2006, Proton updated the Saga LMST in response to the 2005 launch of the Perodua Myvi. The Saga LMST received mainly cosmetic changes, namely a new Clarion integrated radio & CD player, meter cluster and redesigned air conditioner vents on the interior as well as a unique front grille, 14-inch steel rims with hubcaps and chromed head & taillights on the exterior. Proton added a new exhaust manifold and extractor to the tried and tested 1.3 L 4G13 carburetor-fed engine, increasing the Saga LMST power rating to 90 hp (67 kW) at 6,000rpm and 110Nm of torque at 4,200rpm, making the 2006 Saga LMST the fastest and most powerful in its lineage. However, these features and upgrades were only offered for the trim variant with power steering. The cheaper non-power steering variant was equipped with 13-inch steel rims & hubcaps, a cassette player and the exhaust manifold from the 2003 Saga LMST instead. It also lacked the rear spoiler, side skirts, power windows, alarm and central locking. The power-steering variant came with a choice of two paint options, namely orange and black whereas the non-power steering model was only sold in silver. Proton introduced this model in Pakistan on 15 September 2006.

On 4 March 2007, Proton launched the 50th Merdeka Anniversary Promotion in Malaysia. The final facelift model of the final iteration came in the form of the Proton Saga LMST 50th Merdeka Anniversary Edition. It is almost identical to the 2006 Saga LMST, with the only visible differences being the reduced exhaust pipe diameter and slightly altered rear lamps. Most noticeably, it was sold at a discount price of just RM26,999 as opposed to the former RM33,240 price tag. The promotion was made in view of Malaysia's 50th Merdeka celebrations and as a symbol of Proton's gratitude to their customers. That year, the Proton Saga became the second best selling car behind the Perodua Myvi. The Saga LMST was also among the last carburetor-powered passenger cars to be sold in Malaysia.

The Saga LMST was succeeded by the all-new second generation Proton Saga in early 2008.

== Awards ==
- 1991 What Car? – Best Value Car of the Year (Proton Saga 1.5E Aeroback)
- 1992 Auto Express – Best Value Popular New Cars
- 1993 What Car? – Best Buy Family Car up to £10,000
