= MCW Metrocab =

Metrocab
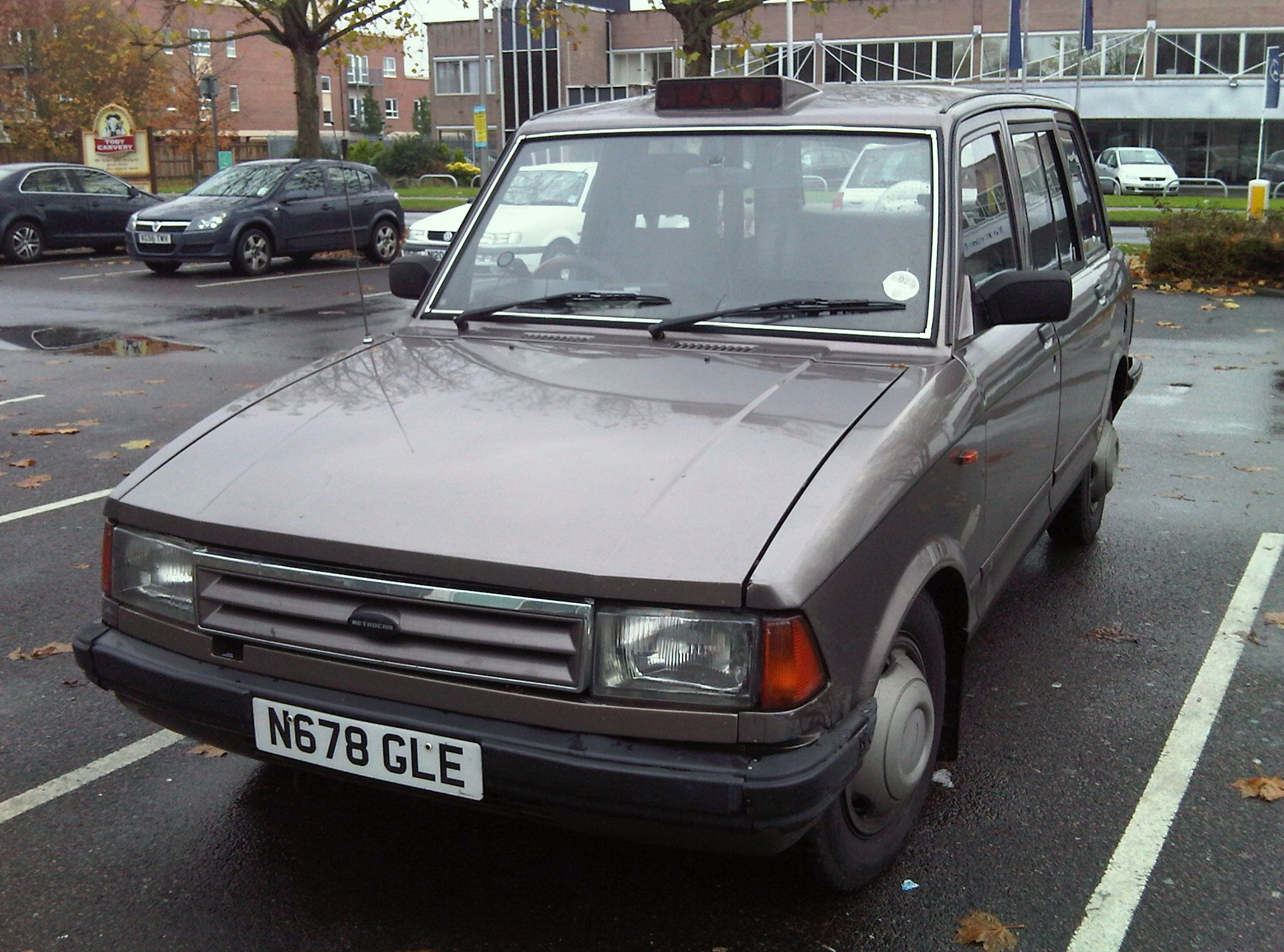

Overview
- Manufacturer: Metro Cammell Weymann (MCW); Reliant; Hooper; Kamkorp
- Production: 1987–2006
- Assembly: Washwood Heath; Tamworth; Westminster, London; Tushino-Auto, Moscow, Russia

Body and chassis
- Class: Taxi
- Body style: 4-door saloon
- Layout: Front-engine, rear-wheel drive

Powertrain
- Engine: 2,446 cc Toyota 2L-T turbodiesel I4; 2,496 cc Ford FSD 425 DI diesel I4
- Transmission: 5-speed manual 4-speed automatic

Dimensions
- Wheelbase: 2,900 mm (114.2 in)
- Length: 4,505 mm (177.4 in)
- Width: 1,760 mm (69.3 in)
- Height: 1,755 mm (69.1 in)
- Kerb weight: 1,830 to 1,955 kg (4,030 to 4,310 lb)

Chronology
- Successor: Ecotive Metrocab

The MCW Metrocab is a taxicab that was manufactured between 1987 and 2000 and as the Metrocab TTT from 2000 to 2006. It was designed and originally produced by the British vehicle manufacturing company Metro Cammell Weymann (MCW), with ownership passing to Reliant in 1989, Hooper in 1991 and finally Kamkorp in 2000.

== History ==
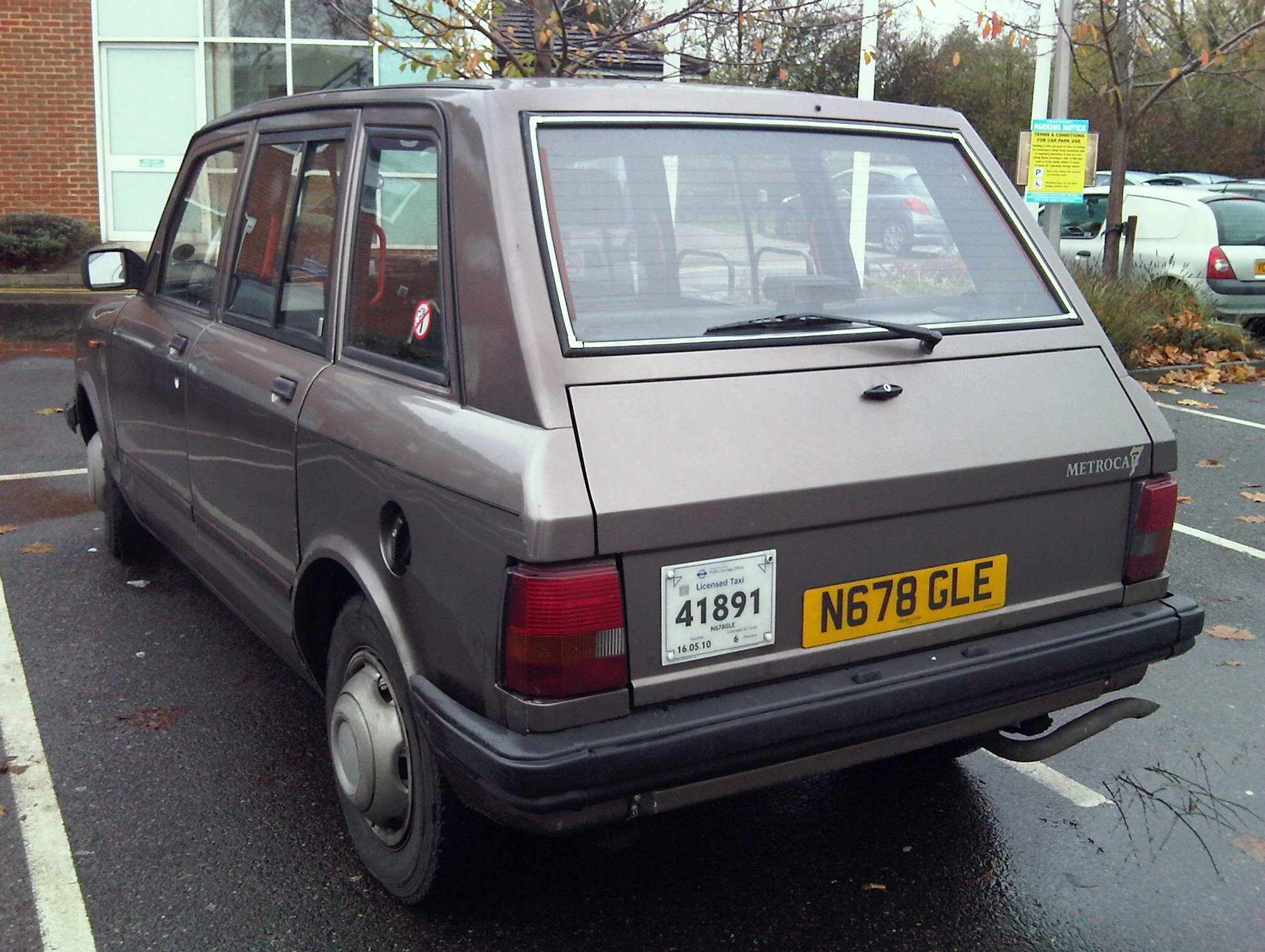
MCW Metrocab

Weymann's Ltd, later Metro-Cammell Weymann, had built the Beardmore Mk 7 taxi until 1966. It was not, therefore, a surprise that they sought to replace it with their own design. However, it was a surprise that it took them so long to get a replacement into production.

The basic design of the vehicle dated back to at least 1970, when a prototype had been caught undergoing trials in Westminster, London. The overall profile of that vehicle closely matched that of the Metrocab launched 17 years later, although the original front grille, taken from a 1970 Ford Cortina Mk II, had been superseded by more contemporary parts by the time the vehicle entered production. These included Ford's 2.5 litre direct-injection diesel engine as used in the contemporary Ford Transit, mated to their A4LD automatic transmission, the headlamps and radiator grille from the Ford Granada (Europe) Mk 2, the taillight units and door handles from the Escort Cabriolet, and the dash moulding, steering wheel and instrument pack from the Austin Rover Maestro/Montego. It featured a particularly low floor to make entry and egress simpler. This made it the first accessible black cab in London. Deliveries of the new vehicle began in February 1987; the cost new was £13,950.

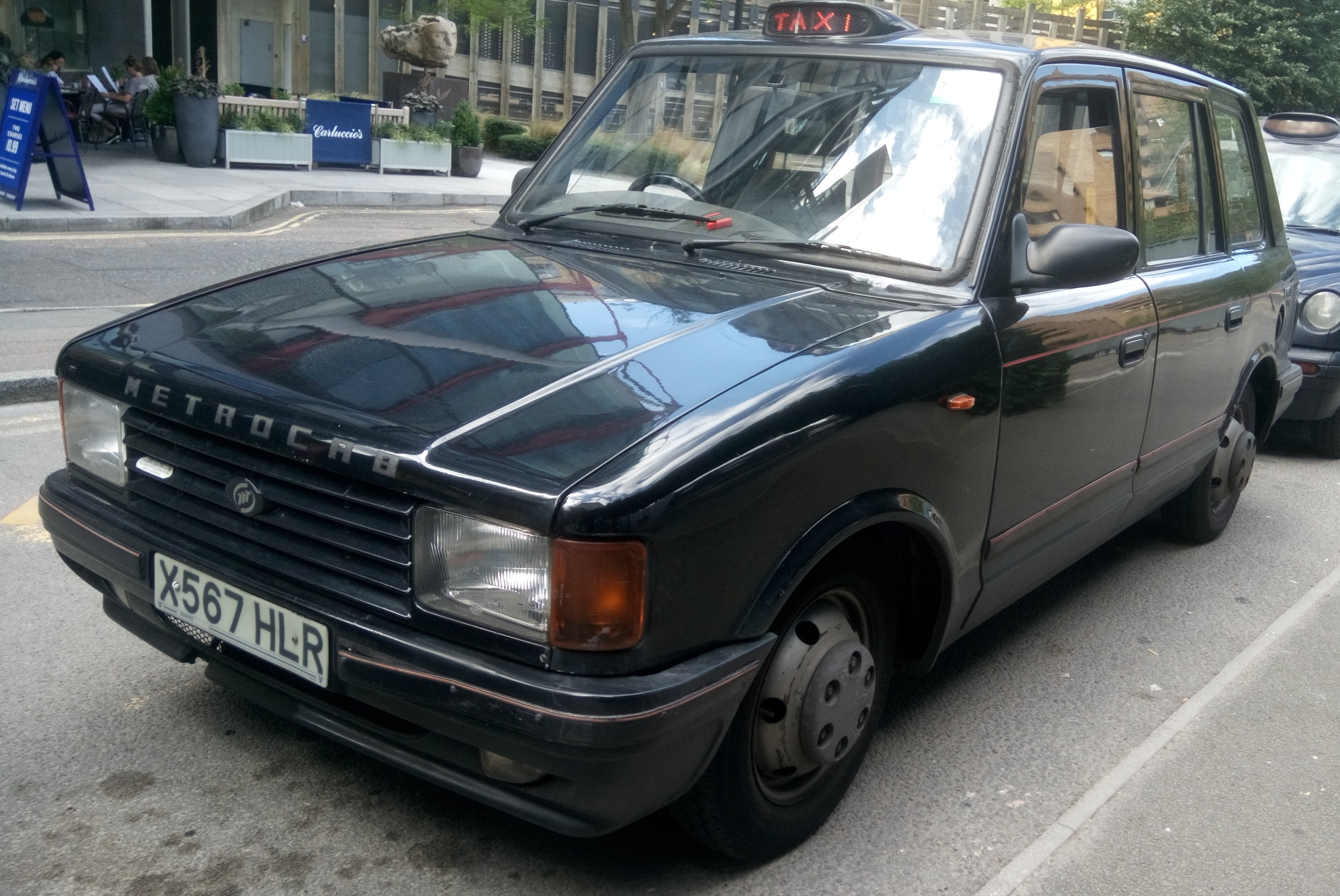
Metrocab II, with new grille and headlights

One of the main suppliers for parts for the Metrocab was Reliant, to whom their taxicab manufacturing business was sold by MCW in 1989. The vehicle remained in production with Metrocab, the new company. In 1997, the Series II Metrocab was announced with many cosmetic changes, in particular a new grille, bumper and light design. The Metrocab featured a range of different badges, reflecting its varied ownership; originally with the MCW logo, it then featured a Reliant badge, before the full Metrocab name was displayed on the leading edge of the bonnet in a similar style to Land Rover as part of the Series II facelift.

Prince Philip sometimes used an LPG-equipped Metrocab around London. Metrocabs were also employed as patient transport vehicles by the London, Mid Glamorgan, North Yorkshire, and Royal Berkshire ambulance services.

=== Vehicle features ===
The vehicle had many notable features for a taxi. The chassis is from galvanized steel and the bodywork was constructed from fibreglass. It was the first Hackney carriage model to have disc brakes as standard (from 1992), it also had a seven-passenger seat option, and wheelchair access. Due to their fibreglass construction and virtually bulletproof engine, many of these early vehicles were still in daily use over 20 years later. Spare parts and workshop advice is available from a small number of specialist repairers.

== Metrocab TTT ==
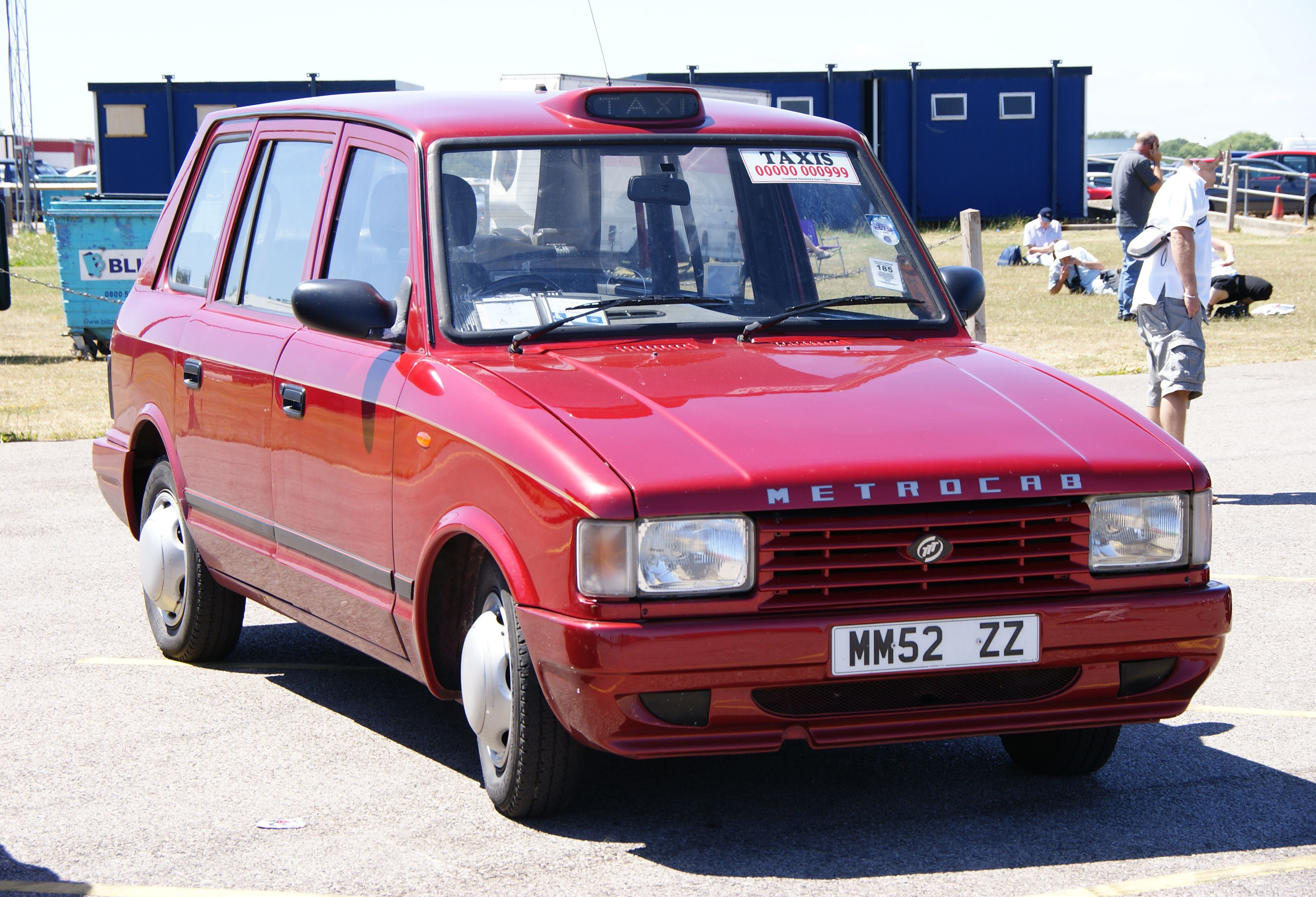
2002 Metrocab TTT

In March 2000, a revised Metrocab was launched as the Metrocab TTT. The TTT was advertised as containing 700 improvements over the original Metrocab, including a new front design, new engine and the end of the fibreglass construction. Shortly after the launch of the new model, ownership of the Metrocab company passed from Reliant to Hooper and then to Kamkorp. Production ceased in 2004 when the company went into administration, and was restarted in 2005 at a rate of one vehicle per week,. Production finally ceased for good in April 2006.

=== Vehicle features ===
The TTT featured a Toyota 2L-T turbodiesel engine. The 2.4-litre (2,446 cc) four-cylinder engine produced 66 kW (89 bhp; 90 PS) at 3,500 rpm and torque of 218 N⋅m (161 lb⋅ft). The TTT was 4,505 mm (177.4 in) long and 1,755 mm (69.1 in) high, and had a kerb weight of 1,955 kg (4,310 lb). Vinyl seats were standard, with available velour interior. There was also a Lux Pack available, including chromed wheel trim, carpeting in the rear, body mouldings, and other additional equipment such as a CD players and velour trim.

== See also ==
- Ecotive Metrocab
