= List of automobile manufacturers of Malaysia =

This is a list of current and defunct automobile manufacturers of Malaysia.

== Current manufacturers ==
- Proton (1983–present)
- Bufori (1986–present)
- EV Innovations
- Perodua (1992–present)
- TD2000 (1998–present)

=== Current contract manufacturers and joint ventures ===
- Berjaya Auto/Bermaz
  - Jetour
- EP Manufacturing
  - GWM
  - MG
  - XPeng
- HICOM Automobile Manufacturers (1983–present) manufactures and distributes for the following companies in Malaysia:
  - Audi
  - Mercedes-Benz
  - Volkswagen
  - Mitsubishi
  - Isuzu (Isuzu HICOM Malaysia)
- Inokom (1992–present) manufactures and distributes for the following companies in Malaysia:
  - BMW
  - Mini
  - Hyundai
  - Mazda
  - Kia
  - Chery
  - Porsche
  - BYD
- Tan Chong Motor (1972–present) manufactures and distributes for the following companies in Malaysia:
  - Nissan
  - GAC
  - Wuling
- UMW Holdings (1987–present) manufactures and distributes for the following companies in Malaysia:
  - Toyota (UMW Toyota Motor)

=== Foreign companies manufacturing in Malaysia ===
- Volvo Car Manufacturing Malaysia (1966–present)
- Hino Motors Manufacturing Malaysia
- Honda Malaysia (2003–present)
- Stellantis Gurun (Malaysia) (2018–present)
- Chery Auto Malaysia (2024–present)

== Former manufacturers ==
- Perusahaan Otomobil Elektrik (1996–mid 2000s)
- Esna (2005)

=== Former contract manufacturers ===
- Naza Automotive Manufacturing (2002–2018; taken over by Stellantis)
