= Ecotive Metrocab =

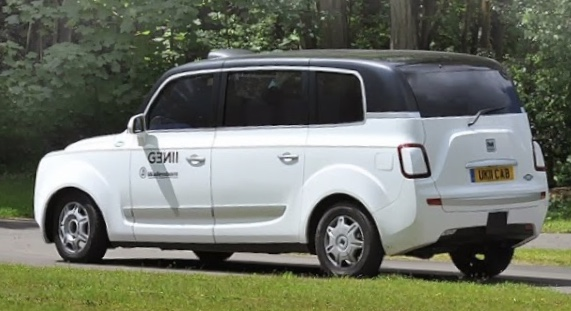

Overview
- Manufacturer: Ecotive (a subsidiary of Kamkorp); Multimatic (under license from Kamkorp)
- Assembly: Mytchett (prototypes); Coventry (production)

Body and chassis
- Class: Taxi
- Body style: 4-door saloon
- Layout: Front-engine, rear-wheel drive

Powertrain
- Engine: 1.0-litre petrol engine with two electric motors

Dimensions
- Wheelbase: 3,181 mm (125.2 in)
- Length: 4,905 mm (193.1 in)
- Width: 1,800 mm (70.9 in)
- Height: 1,925 mm (75.8 in)
- Kerb weight: 2,515 kg (5,540 lb)

Chronology
- Predecessor: MCW Metrocab (1987–2006)

The Ecotive Metrocab (sometimes called New Metrocab), first presented in December 2013, is a purpose-built electrically powered hackney carriage manufactured by Ecotive, a subsidiary of Kamkorp. The vehicle is designed to comply with Transport for London’s taxi regulations, which, from 1 January 2018, ban new diesel-powered taxis and require zero-emissions capability.

The vehicle is electrically powered and has a 1.0-litre petrol engine to extend its range. It is the first authorised electric-powered London black cab. In March 2014 several vehicles were lent to taxi drivers for evaluation.

The Metrocab’s main competitor is the LEVC TX, another completely new electric taxi built to London’s 2018 regulations, and successor to the well-known TX4.

Ecotive Ltd. filed on 29 November 2021 for voluntary liquidation.

== Manufacturing ==
Prototypes were shown to the press in January 2014 and a “small fleet” of vehicles were running with the taxi operator ComCab in early 2015.

In May 2015 it was announced that, following a £50,000,000 investment, 3,500 Metrocab vehicles per year will be manufactured by Multimatic at an expanded plant in Tile Hill, Coventry.

== Technical specifications ==
The manufacturer claims fuel economy of 98 mpg (2.88 L/100 km) on the ECE101 cycle, a range of over 348 miles (560 km), emissions of less than 65g/km CO_{2} per km. It has regenerative braking and can be recharged from a mains electric outlet, as well as by its own petrol engine. It has a turning circle of 25 feet (London taxi regulations specify a maximum turning circle of 25 ft or 7.62 m). It has six passenger seats, with an optional 7th passenger seat in the front. Top speed is restricted to 80 mph. The lithium-ion polymer large format cells have a stored capacity of 12.2kWh.

Peak motor power is 2 x 50 kW. Peak wheel torque is 2 x 1,400Nm.

== Trademark challenge ==
By 2015 London Taxi Company (LTC, now London EV Company), makers of the long-running TX4 taxi, were planning their own electric taxi, the TX5. In June 2015 LTC sued the makers of the Metrocab, claiming breach of trademark. A lawyer for LTC was quoted in the press as saying “It is actually all about the shape”.

In his January 2016 judgement, Mr Justice Arnold rejected all of LTC's claims. He considered that “both LTC’s registered trade marks, which depict models of its taxis, were invalid and that even if LTC’s trade marks had been valid, they would not be infringed by the new Metrocab due to the low degree of similarity between the Metrocab and the LTC taxi”.

In November 2017 the judgement was confirmed at the Court of Appeal. A Metrocab spokesman said: “It is a great pity that unnecessary time has been wasted on a false accusation … We have continued to trial, improve and develop our technology over the last three years with taxi drivers in active service and are extremely proud of our decision to design and develop the entirety of the Metrocab here in the UK. We are looking forward to getting production up and running in Coventry following the court’s decision.”
