= Metrocab =

British taxicab brand

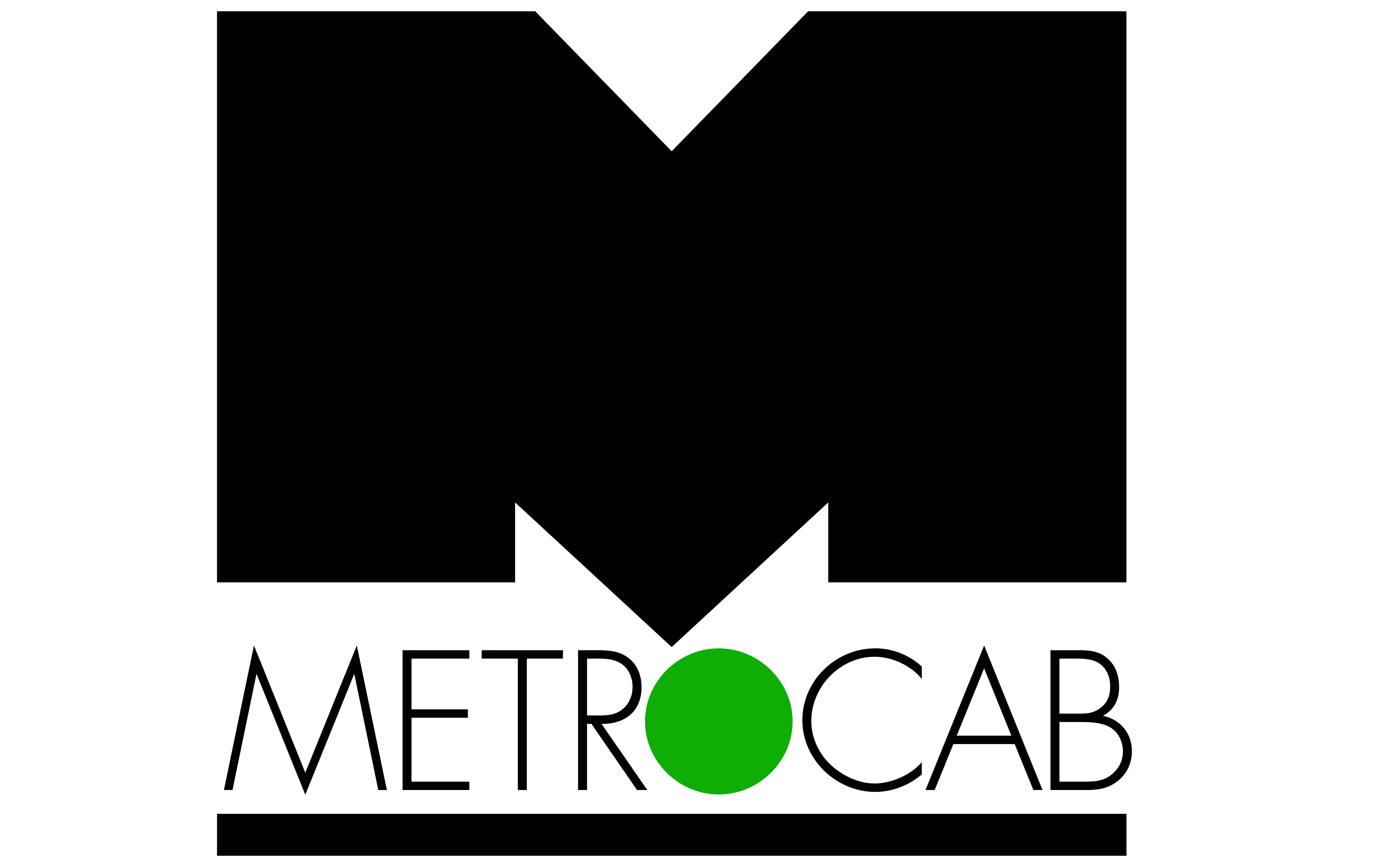
- Founded: 1987
- Defunct: 2021
- Headquarters: United Kingdom
- Website: metrocab.com

Metrocab was a British brand of taxicabs, started by Metro Cammell Weymann in 1987 and from 2001 owned by Kamkorp.

Ecotive Ltd. filed on 29 November 2021 for voluntary liquidation.

== First generation (MCW Metrocab; 1987–2006) ==
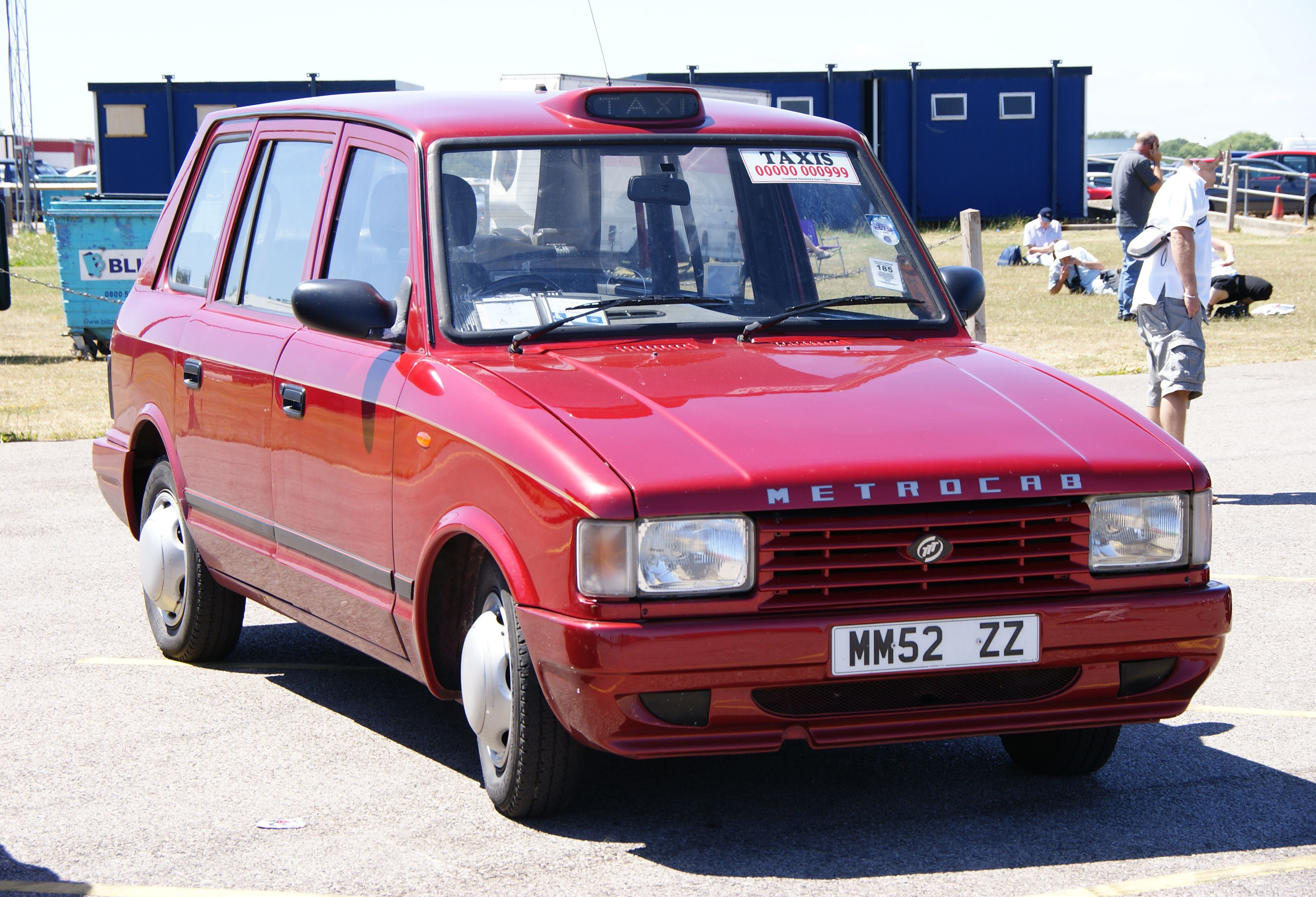
2002 Metrocab TTT

The MCW Metrocab existed in two main variants, the original with a direct-injection diesel engine from the Ford Transit and, from 2000, the Metrocab TTT powered by a Toyota turbodiesel.

Metro Cammell Weymann introduced the MCW Metrocab in 1987. In 1989 MCW’s owner, Laird plc, divested itself of the Metrocab. The rights passed to Reliant and production was moved to Tamworth. When Reliant collapsed in 1991, the receiver sold rights to Hooper, which kept the vehicle in production until December 2000, when Hooper itself suspended trading. Current owner Kamkorp purchased rights from Hooper’s administrator Leonard Curtis in June 2001 and restarted production under a new holding company Metrocab (UK). The vehicle remained in production until April 2006 (apart from a 14-month suspension which ended April 2005).

== Second generation (Ecotive Metrocab; 2014–2021) ==
In 2014 a completely new Metrocab was presented to the press, electrically powered with a 1.0-litre range-extender petrol engine. It is the first authorised electric-powered London black cab. It is a hybrid petrol-electric vehicle capable of zero emission operation and designed to comply with London Taxi Private Hire (LTPH) regulations.
