= Perusahaan Otomobil Elektrik (Malaysia) =

Malaysian electric vehicle production company

- Industry: Automotive
- Founded: November 1996; 29 years ago
- Founder: Mahathir Mohamad; Kamal Siddiqi
- Defunct: mid-2000s
- Headquarters: Kajang, Malaysia,
- Key people: Ahmad Tajuddin Ali (Chairman); Azlan Robert (GM)
- Products: Electric vehicles
- Parent: Tenaga Nasional; Frazer-Nash Research

Perusahaan Otomobil Elektrik (Malaysia) Sdn. Bhd. (POEM) (lit. Electric Automobile Company (Malaysia)) is the name of a defunct Malaysian company that produced small electric vehicles in the late 1990s and early 2000s. POEM was established in 1996 as a joint venture between Tenaga Nasional and Frazer-Nash Research. The first POEM vehicle, the Eleksuria was touted as Malaysia's first electric vehicle upon its launch in December 1997.

POEM electric vehicles were most notably used as personnel transporters during the 1998 Commonwealth Games and 2000 Summer Olympics. POEM had aspired to mass produce small electric vehicles for primarily business customers in domestic and export markets. Although prospects were reportedly positive, the joint venture quickly broke down and POEM quietly faded into obscurity by the mid-2000s.

== History ==
Perusahaan Otomobil Elektrik (Malaysia) was one of several 'national car' companies set up in the 1990s under the purview of Mahathir Mohamad. The first of the national car companies, Proton was set up in 1983 as the result of the National Car Project, fast-tracked by Mahathir upon his ascension to the post of Prime Minister in 1981. Despite initial struggles and complications, Proton managed to firmly establish itself as a major player in the local market, and its success paved the way for a wave of new Mahathir-endorsed national car companies in the 1990s. Perodua commenced production of small economy vehicles in 1994, followed by USPD which produced non-mainstream Proton models in 1996, Modenas (1996) which produced motorcycles, Hicom (1997) and Inokom (1998) which produced trucks and vans, Bufori (1998) and TD Cars (1998) which produced retro classics, and POEM (1997) which produced small electric vehicles.

Perusahaan Otomobil Elektrik (Malaysia) was incorporated in November 1996 as a joint-venture primarily between Malaysian state-owned electricity provider Tenaga Nasional Berhad (TNB) (40%) and UK-based Frazer-Nash Research (FNR) (30%). The remaining 30% equity was divided between Musteq Industries, FIMA chairman Basir Ismail, and Composite Automotive Research (CAR), a company founded by former Proton general manager Nadzmi Salleh. It was reported that FNR approached TNB with the concept of electric vehicle production in 1996. Frazer-Nash Research is a subsidiary of Kamkorp, a company chaired by India-born, UK-based businessman Kamal Siddiqi. The close relationship between Mahathir Mohamad and Kamal Siddiqi was instrumental in the establishment of POEM. Under the original joint venture agreement, FNR had offered their electric vehicle technology, while TNB agreed to produce the end product using body components supplied by CAR and Musteq. The chairman of POEM, Ahmad Tajuddin Ali hoped that the joint venture would enable technology transfer for electric vehicle development in Malaysia while also reducing environmental pollution, whereas Mahathir opined that electric vehicles would offer more choices in the market.

On 1 December 1997, the first product from the joint venture, the Eleksuria was launched in Bangi and subsequently exhibited at the 1997 Langkawi International Maritime and Aerospace Exhibition (LIMA '97). POEM produced more electric vehicles for use as personnel transporters at various public events such as the 1998 Commonwealth Games in Kuala Lumpur and the 2000 Summer Olympics in Sydney. By late 1999, POEM had shifted production to a larger facility in the Hicom Glenmarie complex which could produce 6,000 units annually. TNB also raised its equity stake in POEM from 40% to 92%, with the remaining 8% held by FNR. By late 2000, it was reported that POEM had sold over 3,000 electric vehicles to various business customers in both domestic and export markets.

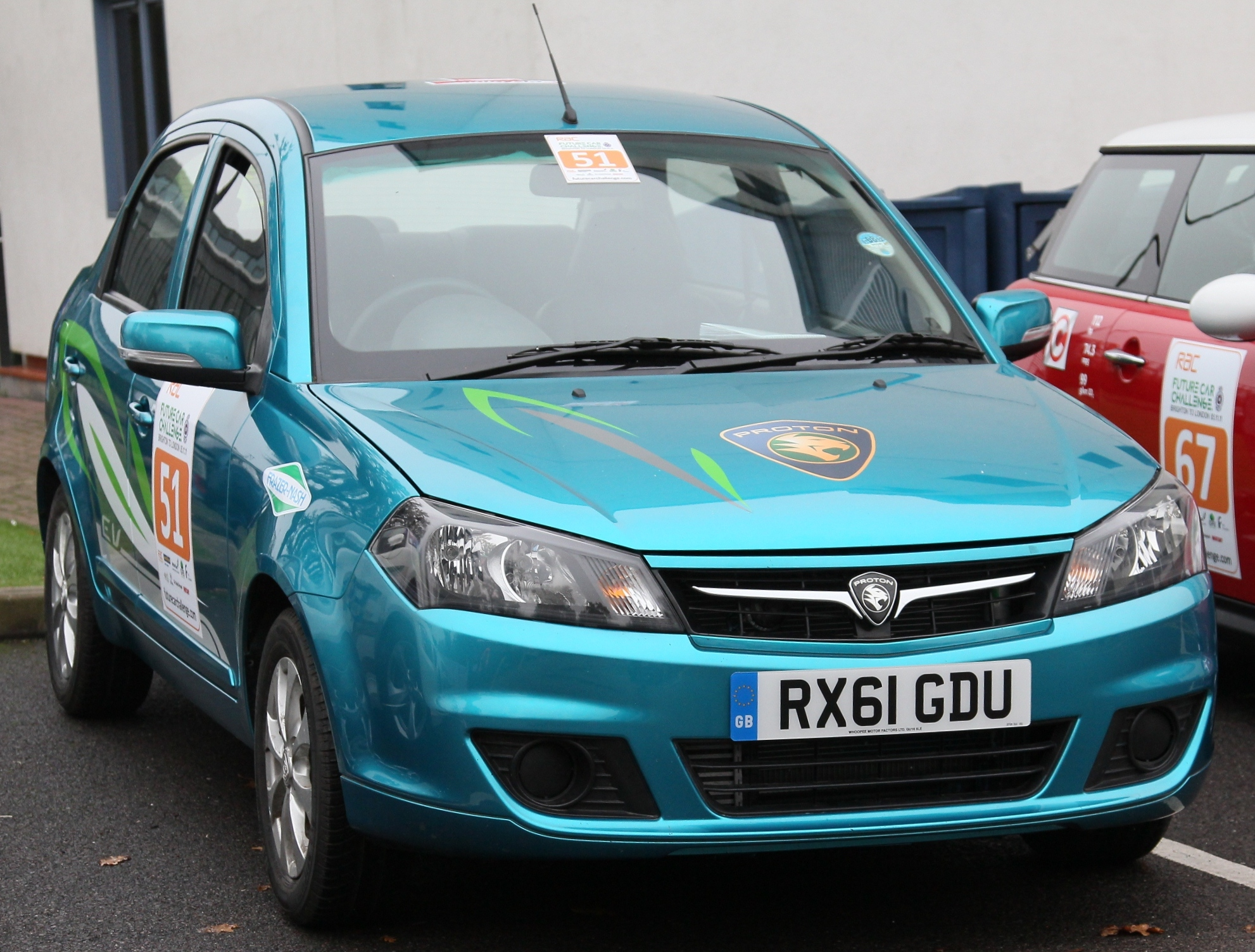
Frazer-Nash Research helped develop several electric-powered Proton prototypes. (2011 Proton Saga EV pictured)

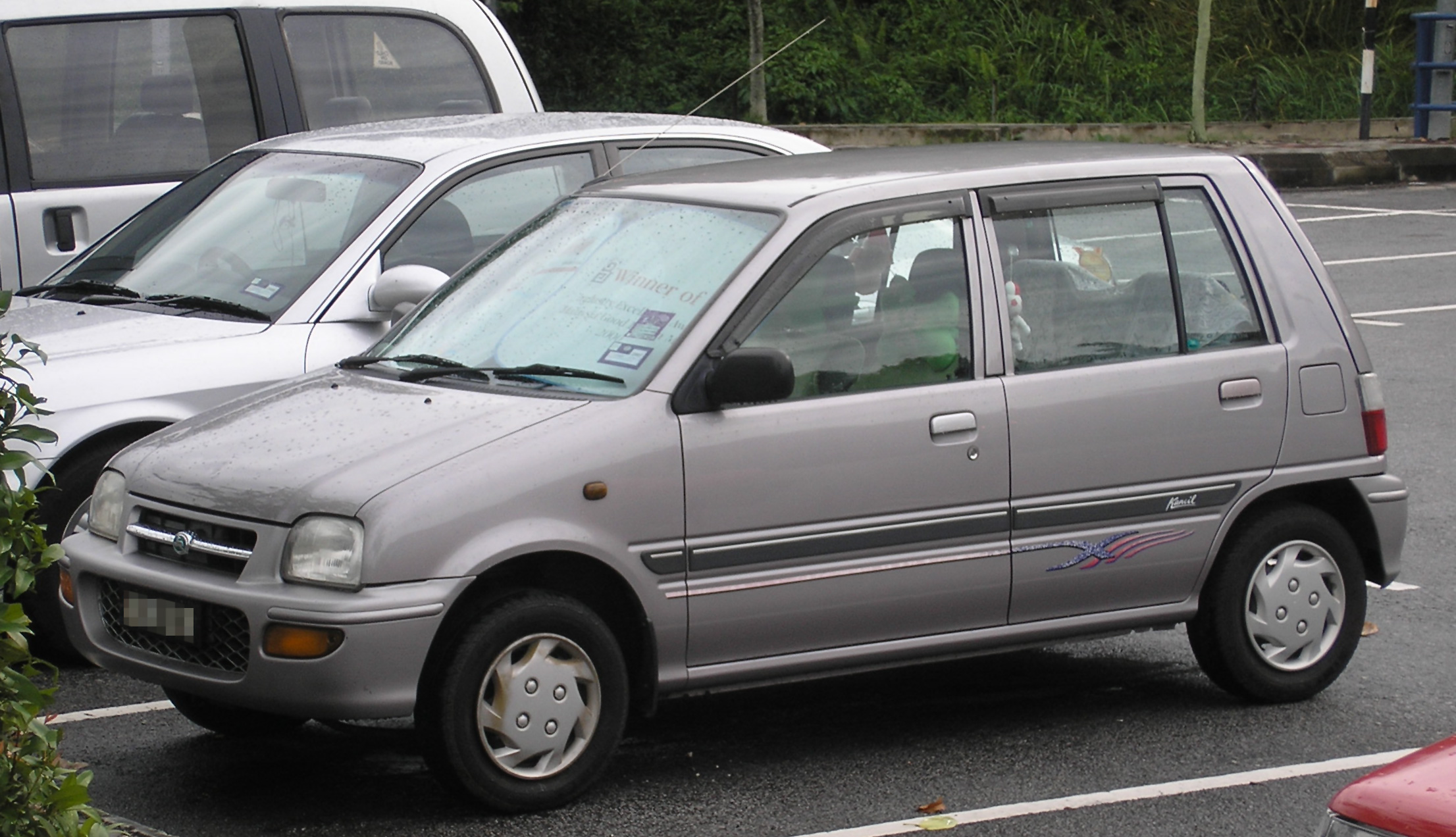
Tenaga Nasional made an electric-powered Kancil prototype in 1999. (regular Perodua Kancil pictured)

However, the joint venture began to break down in 1999, and TNB subsequently relinquished its majority stake to FNR. By early 2000, POEM had been restructured as an 80:20 joint venture between FNR and TNB. The reasoning behind the breakdown is unclear, but it was reported that FNR was losing millions of pounds and was indebted to many of its business partners. Malaysia was also gripped by its worst-ever economic crisis in 1997/1998. Additionally, POEM's American battery supplier Electrosource also went bankrupt in November 2001.

Nonetheless, TNB gradually acquired the technical know-how for electric vehicle development, and in October 1999, the company unveiled that it had developed a prototype of an electric-powered Perodua Kancil, which it claimed was ready for commercial production. TNB had previously developed an electric-powered van prototype as early as October 1996. Despite its early gains in electric vehicle technology, Tenaga Nasional did not pursue any subsequent large scale endeavours into the automotive industry. However, the relationship between Mahathir Mohamad and Kamal Siddiqi held on and Frazer-Nash Research would go on to work with Proton in the late 2000s, leading up to several hybrid-electric prototypes of the Saga, Persona and Exora which participated in the 2011 RAC Future Car Challenge. The electric-powered Protons were hailed and touted for mass production, but like the FNR-TNB joint venture, the FNR-Proton project ultimately stalled, and Proton would go on to partner with Korea-based LG Electronics for its electric vehicle development.

By the mid-2000s, Perusahaan Otomobil Elektrik (Malaysia) had effectively stalled and the company became a dormant entity. TNB later took FNR to court over failed debt repayments, and the ensuing legal tussle dragged on as late as 2018. In September 2015, FNR chairman Kamal Siddiqi became implicated in the 'Justogate' scandal. By the late 2010s, Frazer-Nash Research had incurred significant debt, and the British court ordered it to wind up along with its parent company Kamkorp.

== POEM Eleksuria ==
The first product from Perusahaan Otomobil Elektrik (Malaysia), the Eleksuria was launched on 1 December 1997. The Eleksuria is a licensed produced version of the 'Solar Baby' developed by Frazer-Nash Research. The Solar Baby / Eleksuria is a fully-electric buggy-type vehicle which could seat four occupants. POEM commenced limited production of the Eleksuria in November 1997 at a temporary facility within Tenaga Nasional's UNITEN campus with a small workforce of 30 to 40 personnel. The conventional lead-acid batteries which powered the Eleksuria gave it a claimed range of 120 km between charges, and could be fully charged within an hour. The Eleksuria was reportedly produced with more than 50% local content, while the batteries for later models were known to be sourced from Texas-based Electrosource Inc.. It was reportedly priced around RM 40,000 in February 1998, and was sold to primarily business customers. The Eleksuria was never intended to compete against conventional vehicles such as the Perodua Kancil or Modenas motorcycles. The initial batch of Eleksuria produced were not road legal, and was only permitted for use on private property grounds such as at airports and resorts. However, by July 1998, the Eleksuria had received JPJ road legal certification for use on all Malaysian roads except highways. POEM also unveiled an updated version of the Eleksuria in July 1998, featuring a more car-like design with doors and headlights which were more spaced apart.

Apart from the Eleksuria, POEM had also produced other variants and configurations to suit different applications and buyers. Where the Eleksuria was primarily designed as a people-mover, a 'Golf Buggy' variant was produced for golf resort use, a 'Harrods Buggy' version was designed for British department chain Harrods, and an 'Airport Buggy' model was made for use at Kuala Lumpur International Airport (KLIA). Some of the variants produced also had roof-mounted solar panels. POEM also had plans to produce electric motorcycles.

By late 2000, POEM had reportedly sold over 3,000 electric vehicles to business customers in both domestic and export markets. Around 500 units were reportedly sold to Egyptian businessman, Mohamed Al-Fayed for use at his luxury department chain Harrods. At least 300 POEM vehicles were reportedly supplied to the organisers of the 1998 Commonwealth Games. POEM electric vehicles were also supplied to TNB power plants throughout Malaysia. POEM supplied at least 324 electric vehicles to Frazer-Nash Australia for sale to the organisers of the 2000 Summer Olympics, half of which were reportedly Solar Baby / Eleksuria models. The POEM units exported to Australia were marketed as Frazer-Nash vehicles instead. After the Olympics concluded, the organisers sold the various electric vehicles to private buyers and local establishments. However, a report by the Sydney Morning Herald later detailed how many of the vehicles had broken down by 2002, and that Frazer-Nash Australia couldn't service or repair them, as Frazer-Nash UK had by then cut-off financial support to their Australian branch.

One such Eleksuria unit from the 2000 Summer Olympics is currently preserved at the National Transport Museum in Inverell, NSW.

== See also ==
- Neighborhood electric vehicle
- Microcar
- History of the electric vehicle
- Plug-in electric vehicles in Malaysia
