= Kamkorp =

Kamkorp Limited
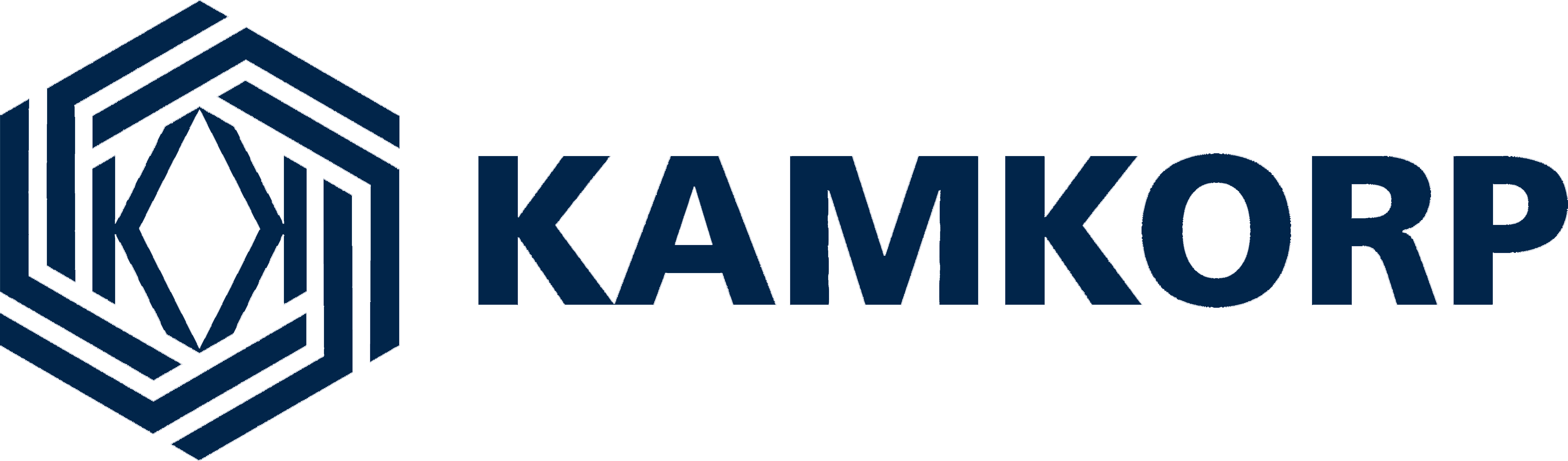
- Type: Private company (In Liquidation)
- Industry: Research and Development
- Headquarters: United Kingdom
- Website: www.kamkorp.com

The Kamkorp Group was a privately held holding company, encompassing a wide range of businesses but operates mainly as Frazer-Nash Research Ltd. It was owned by UK-based Indian businessman Kamal Siddiqi. Over the past 25 years, the Kamkorp Group has developed proprietary digital electric and hybrid electric powertrains and products for the transportation and industrial markets. The company has produced various automobile prototypes under the brands Frazer-Nash and Metrocab. Until 2020 it owned Bristol Cars, under which brand the Bristol Bullet sports car was being developed. The Bullet was unveiled on 26 July 2016 and production was to have started in 2017.

In July 2018, Frazer-Nash Research Limited was ordered by the court to be wound-up, and in November 2018 a liquidator was appointed in order to liquidate the company. In January 2020 Kamkorp Limited was also ordered by the court to be wound-up, and in February 2020 a liquidator was appointed in order to liquidate the company.

Frazer-Nash Research Limited
- Type: Private company (In Liquidation)
- Industry: Research and Development
- Headquarters: United Kingdom
- Website: frazer-nash.com

== Frazer-Nash Research Limited (FNR) ==
Frazer-Nash Research Limited (FNR) was a British Research and Development company and the powerhouse of the Kamkorp Group of Companies. FNR develops projects from concept through to low volume production. In-house capabilities include mechanics, electronics, software, electrical, industrial and automotive engineering. All components of FN Range-Extended Electric powertrain are designed in-house, using systems and sub-systems developed and built within the Group companies.

=== Range-Extended Electric Powertrain ===
FNR developed a Range-Extended Electric (REE) powertrain that has been applied to a variety of vehicle platforms from city cars to low-cost mass-transit monorails. These are electric vehicles, with an internal combustion engine (range extender) powering a matched generator as an auxiliary power unit, charging the battery pack and/or providing energy directly to the electric motors.

=== Applications ===
The technology has been applied to a range of vehicle platforms and products by FNR, and by others developed in partnership.

=== 1990s ===
==== Solar Baby ====
A zero emission people mover which was assembled in Malaysia through a joint venture company, Perusahaan Otomobil Elektrik (POEM).

==== Go Kart ====
The electric Go Kart was Frazer-Nash Research's first electric drive product.

=== 2000s ===
==== Sense City Car ====
An electric vehicle (EV) designed for city and urban use.

==== Road Train ====
The Road Runner had 12-motors, 4 per carriage, and could carry 45 passengers.

==== Windsor ====
The Windsor was designed for golf courses and large estates.

=== 2010s ===
Frazer-Nash Research collaborated with Proton Cars of Malaysia to produce electric-powered prototypes of its Saga, Persona and Exora vehicles which subsequently participated in the RAC 2011 Brighton to London Future Car Challenge. Winners were determined by fuel efficiency and least polluting. The Proton Exora won in its category for two consecutive years.

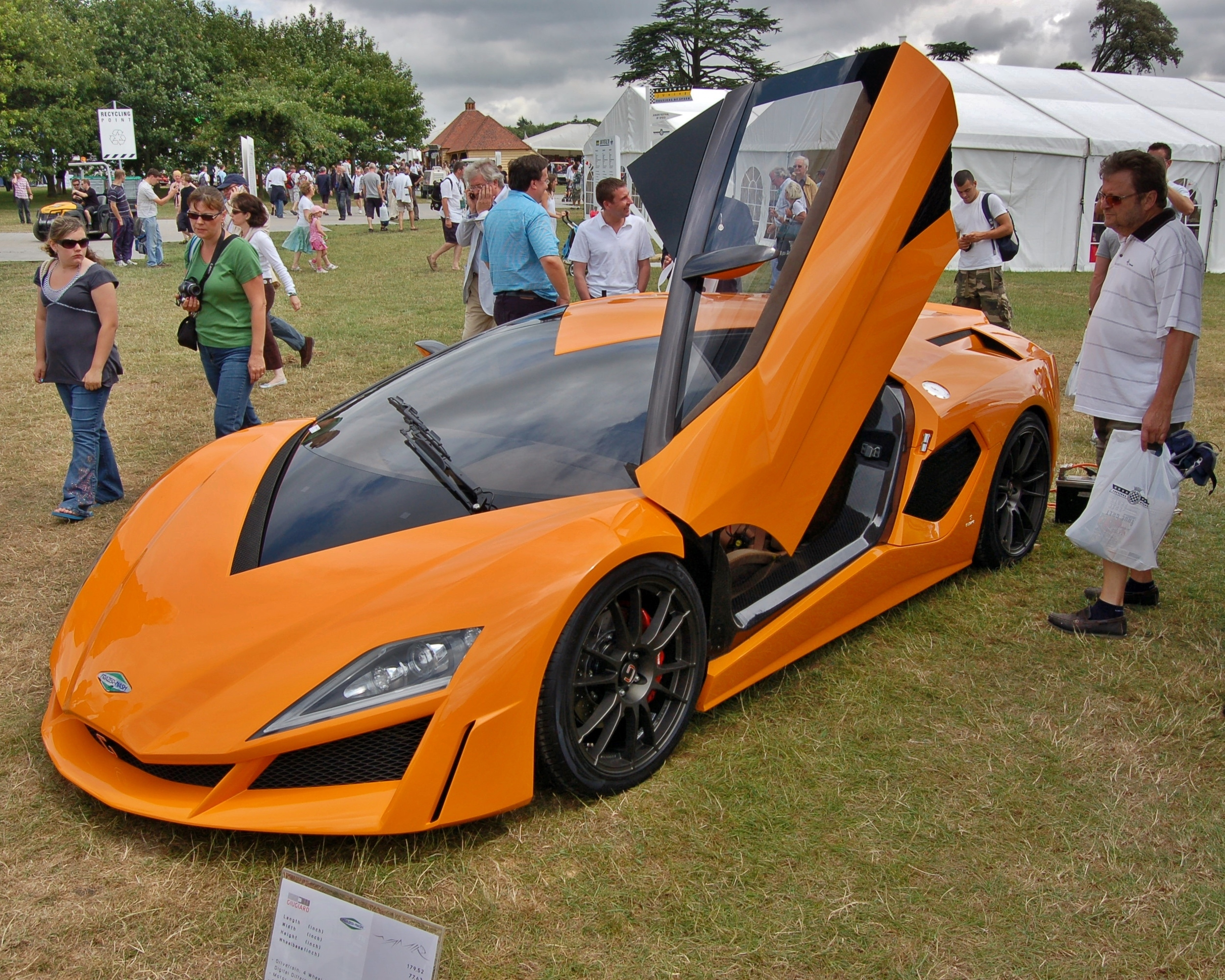
The Namir on display at the Goodwood Festival of Speed in 2009

The Frazer-Nash Namir, a prototype of a two-seater supercar claimed to be the "world’s fastest hybrid", was presented at the 2009 Geneva Motor Show. It was stated it was capable of 187 mph with economy of 160mpg. According to Autocar magazine, "Frazer-Nash developed and supplied the four-motor powertrain, while Italdesign Giugiaro engineered and built everything else, from suspension to the carbonfibre tub." The prototype performed a demonstration run at the Goodwood Festival of Speed later in 2009.

The Metrail Monorail system, with its core Frazer-Nash powertrain technology, utilises the latest advances in microelectronics, lightweight composite materials and computerised traction systems. The Metrail system benefits from a self-contained on board energy system, ruling out the need for a ‘third rail’.

The Metrocab is a Zero emissions capable taxi trialled in London. The Metrocab, like most of the above applications has the core FN powertrain technology. The taxi is driven by two electric motors, with a 1-litre petrol engine used to recharge the battery pack, coupled with an optimised generator. Charging whilst on the go takes as little as 10 minutes, alternative charging can be achieved via any electric mains outlet.

== Notable group milestones ==
=== 1991: Frazer-Nash Research New Ownership ===
Frazer-Nash Research Limited (FNR) is the flagship company of the Kamkorp Group, and is a Research and Development company. Frazer-Nash Research focuses the development of multi-motor EV powertrain technology.

=== 1998: Malaysian Commonwealth Games ===
Frazer-Nash Research manufactured and supplied 120 electric vehicles for the 1998 Commonwealth Games in Kuala Lumpur, Malaysia. The vehicles provided were also used by Team GB to navigate the Commonwealth Park.

=== 2000: Sydney Olympic Games ===
Frazer-Nash was the exclusive supplier of electric vehicles to the Olympic Games in Sydney in September 2000, providing over 300 vehicles to carry police officers, officials, athletes and equipment around the Olympic Park.

=== 2003: Metrail demonstrator Malaysia ===
Extending the Frazer-Nash powertrain platform, on 18 September 2003, Metrail part of the Kamkorp Group established a test demonstration facility for its electric Monorail system in Nilai, Malaysia. The monorail was constructed over a 6-month period and operated for over 9 years.

=== 2004: Kamkorp buys London taxi manufacturer Metrocab ===
Ecotive Ltd, part of the Kamkorp Group of Companies, became the new owners of the Metrocab brand in 2004, collaborating with R&D Company Frazer-Nash Research Ltd to design and develop a Metrocab taxi for greener and more sustainable transport in compliance with the upcoming Ultra Low Emission Zone in London. In 2014 the Metrocab became the world's first REE Taxi licensed by any major metropolitan area in the world, a trial fleet was deployed in London marking this milestone. Ecotive Ltd partnered with Global Manufacturing Specialist Multimatic to take the product into production for Mayor Boris Johnsons Zero-Emissions-Capable target date of 1 January 2018.

Ecotive Ltd. filed on 29 November 2021 for voluntary liquidation.

=== 2011: Group buys luxury car maker Bristol Cars ===
The assets of the former Bristol Cars Limited and Bristol Cars Services Limited were purchased by the Kamkorp Group.

Bristol Cars Limited and Bristol Cars Services Limited, part of Bristol Automotive Group, are engaged in the manufacturing and trading of luxury cars with headquarters in Kensington, London.

=== 2014: The Kamkorp Group buys significant shares in URT Group ===
URT (founded as Universal Race Technology) Group was a composites manufacturer and engineering solutions provider. URT designs, machines and manufactures composite components.
