= Proton Exora =

Malaysian compact multi-purpose vehicle

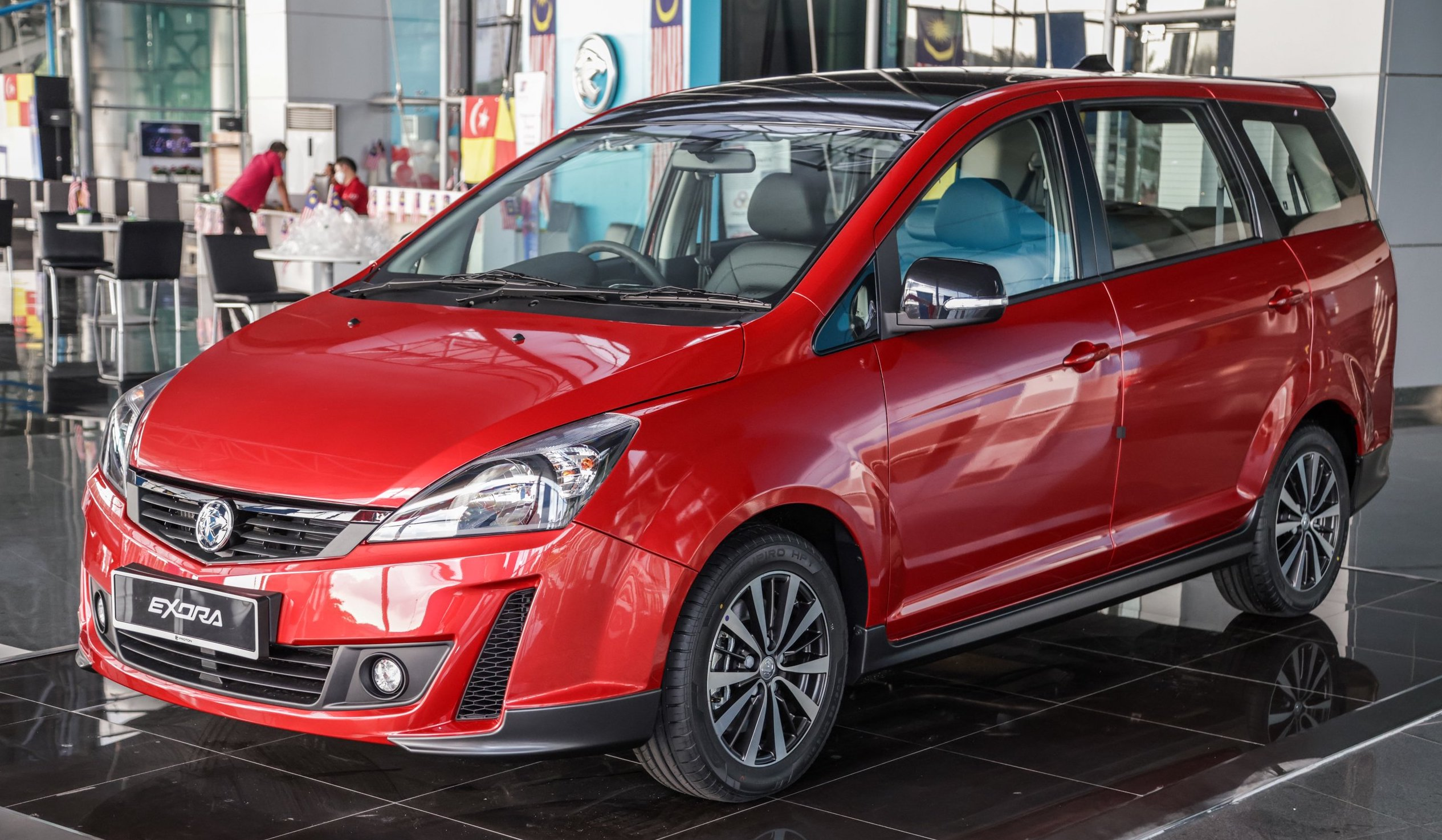
- 2023 Exora

Overview
- Manufacturer: Proton
- Production: March 2009 – October 2023 (196,583 Units)
- Assembly: Malaysia: Shah Alam, Selangor (Proton Hicom Factory)

Body and chassis
- Class: Compact MPV
- Body style: 5-door wagon
- Layout: Front-engine, front-wheel drive
- Platform: Proton P2

Powertrain
- Engine: Petrol: 1.6 L CamPro CPS DOHC I4(2009-2016); 1.6 L CamPro CFE DOHC I4 turbo (2011-2023)
- Transmission: 5-speed manual 4-speed automatic CVT

Dimensions
- Wheelbase: 2,730 mm (107.5 in)
- Length: 4,615 mm (181.7 in)
- Width: 1,809 mm (71.2 in)
- Height: 1,691 mm (66.6 in)
- Kerb weight: 1,442–1,457 kg (3,179.1–3,212.1 lb)

Chronology
- Successor: Proton X90 (indirect)

The Proton Exora is an automobile produced by the Malaysian car manufacturer Proton from 2009 to 2023. Considered to be a compact multi-purpose vehicle (MPV) in the C-segment, it became Malaysia's first locally developed MPV upon its release on April 15, 2009. The Exora is the first Proton based on the P2 platform. Its facelift revision, which debuted on December 15, 2011, became the first Proton to use the CamPro CFE turbocharged engine and CVT technology.

== History ==
=== Pre-launch ===
The first sketches of a Proton MPV existed as early as the 1990s. During this period, all of Proton's offerings were either saloon or hatchback vehicles. In 2001, Proton experimented with larger vehicles by introducing the Juara Mini-MPV, a rebadged Mitsubishi Town Box Wide. However, its unconventional kei car design drew criticism, and it was discontinued in 2004 amid poor sales.

The Proton MPV project was later revived in mid-2006 under the leadership of former Proton Managing Director Syed Zainal Abidin. The car was designed to suit Malaysian tastes and expectations, built from the ground up on an all-new platform. The result was the Proton P2 platform, developed in house by Proton with consultancy from LG CNS. On February 11, 2008, the Proton MPV was officially announced for an early 2009 launch.

Sketches of the MPV were aired on Malaysian national television on May 27, 2008, previewing its upcoming features. Proton filed a patent for the upcoming MPV with the United Kingdom Intellectual Property Office (IPO) on October 24, 2008, and it was approved several days later, on November 4.

The official name Proton Exora, along with its tagline Keriangan Keluarga (English: Family Fun) was announced on February 17, 2009. "Exora," which was inspired from the Ixora flower, was chosen among 251,763 entries during the Name The Proton MPV competition by the grand prize winner, Norsholihan Binti Abdul Eanich. After a development phase of 18 months, production of the Exora finally commenced in March 2009 at Proton's Shah Alam plant.

=== Exora (2009–2010) ===
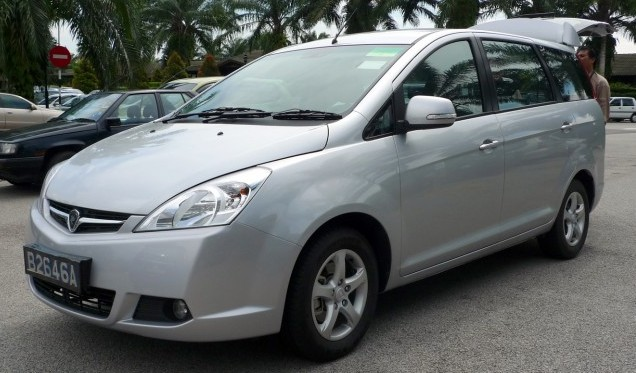
2009 Proton Exora H-Line during media preview in Cyberjaya

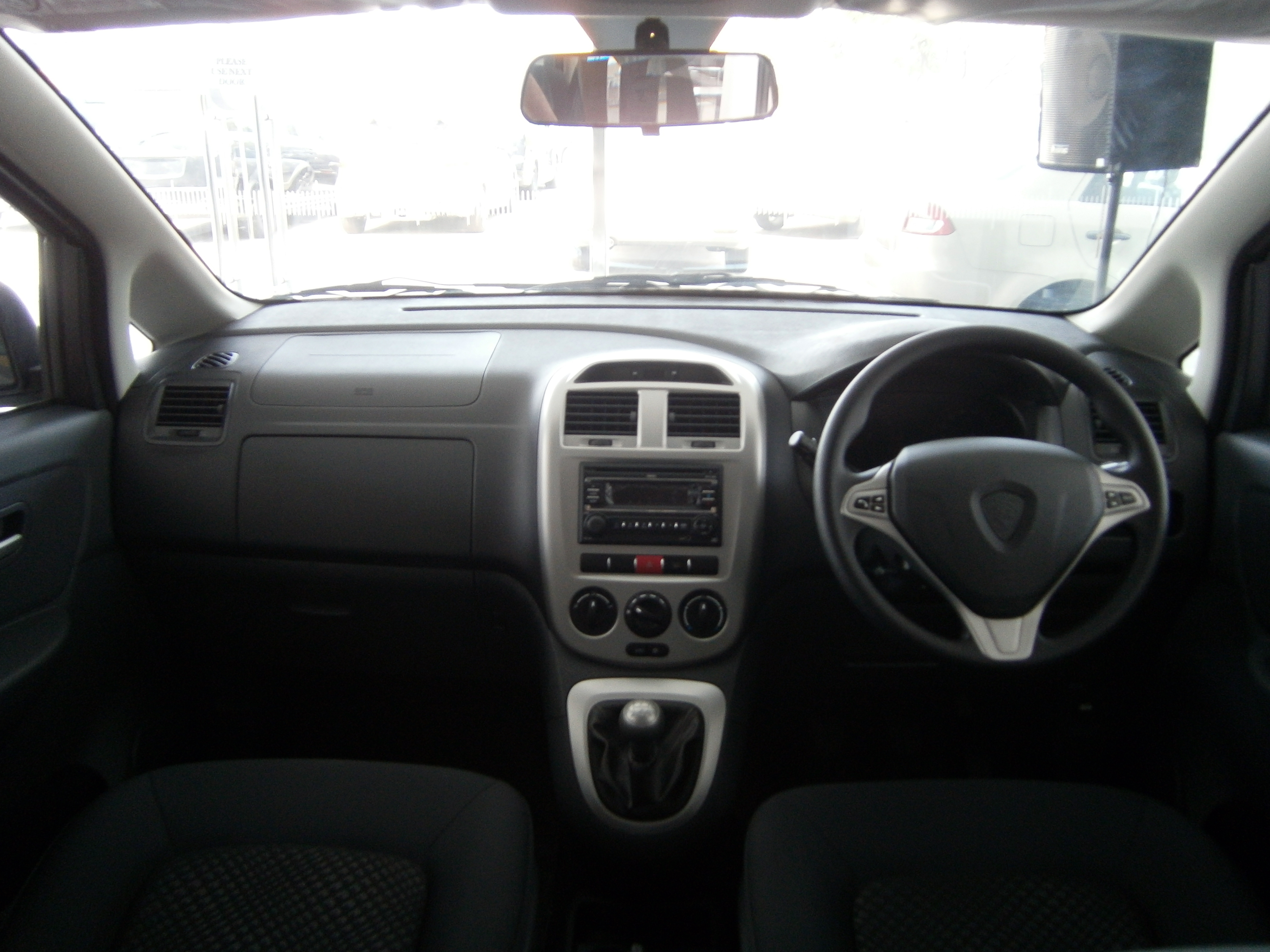
Interior

The Proton Exora was officially unveiled on April 15, 2009, becoming Malaysia's first indigenously designed MPV. It was offered in two trim variants upon its initial launch, the M-Line and H-Line respectively. Both variants were powered by the 1.6 litre CamPro CPS engine and limited to a four-speed automatic transmission.

The Exora M-Line MT was introduced on July 7, 2009, becoming the first Exora variant available with a five-speed manual transmission.

A no frills version of the Exora was spotted undergoing testing on June 22, 2009. It later materialized into the Exora B-Line trim (known latter as standard), debuting on November 19, 2009, four days before the Perodua Alza's launch. The variant is equipped with fewer safety features and is available only in manual transmission.

==== 25th Anniversary Edition ====
Proton unveiled the Exora 25th Anniversary Edition, alongside a Saga and Persona variant in July 2010.

=== Exora (MC) (2010–2011) ===
On July 15, 2010, 15 months after the initial launch, Proton released the Exora MC, in which "MC" denotes Minor Change. The car received a new body kit, chrome-plated front fog light surrounds and 15-inch twin five spoke alloy rims on the exterior, whereas the interior featured darker grey trim panels and Alcantara/suede on the door panels.

=== Exora Bold and Exora Prime (2011–2014) ===
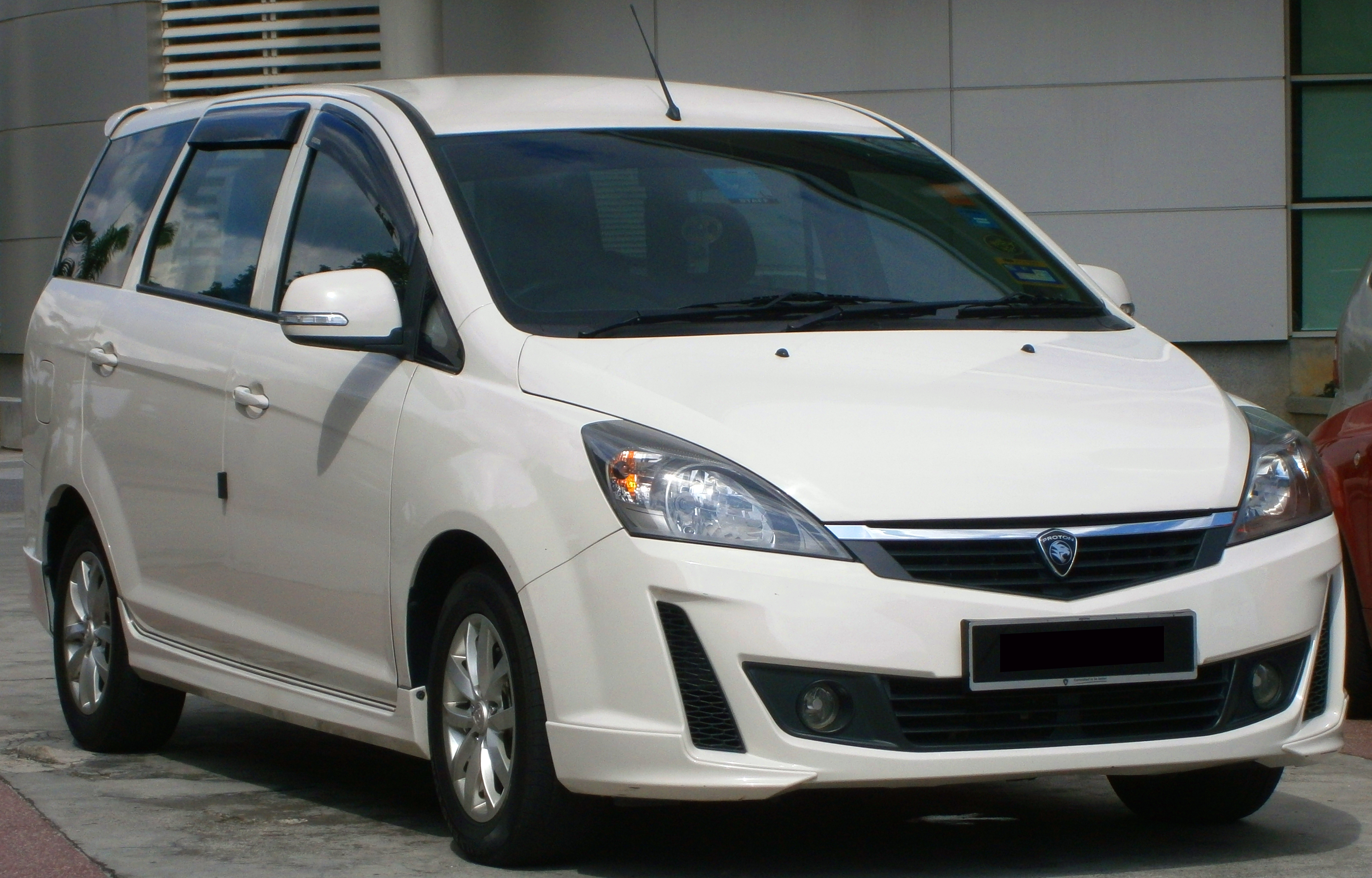
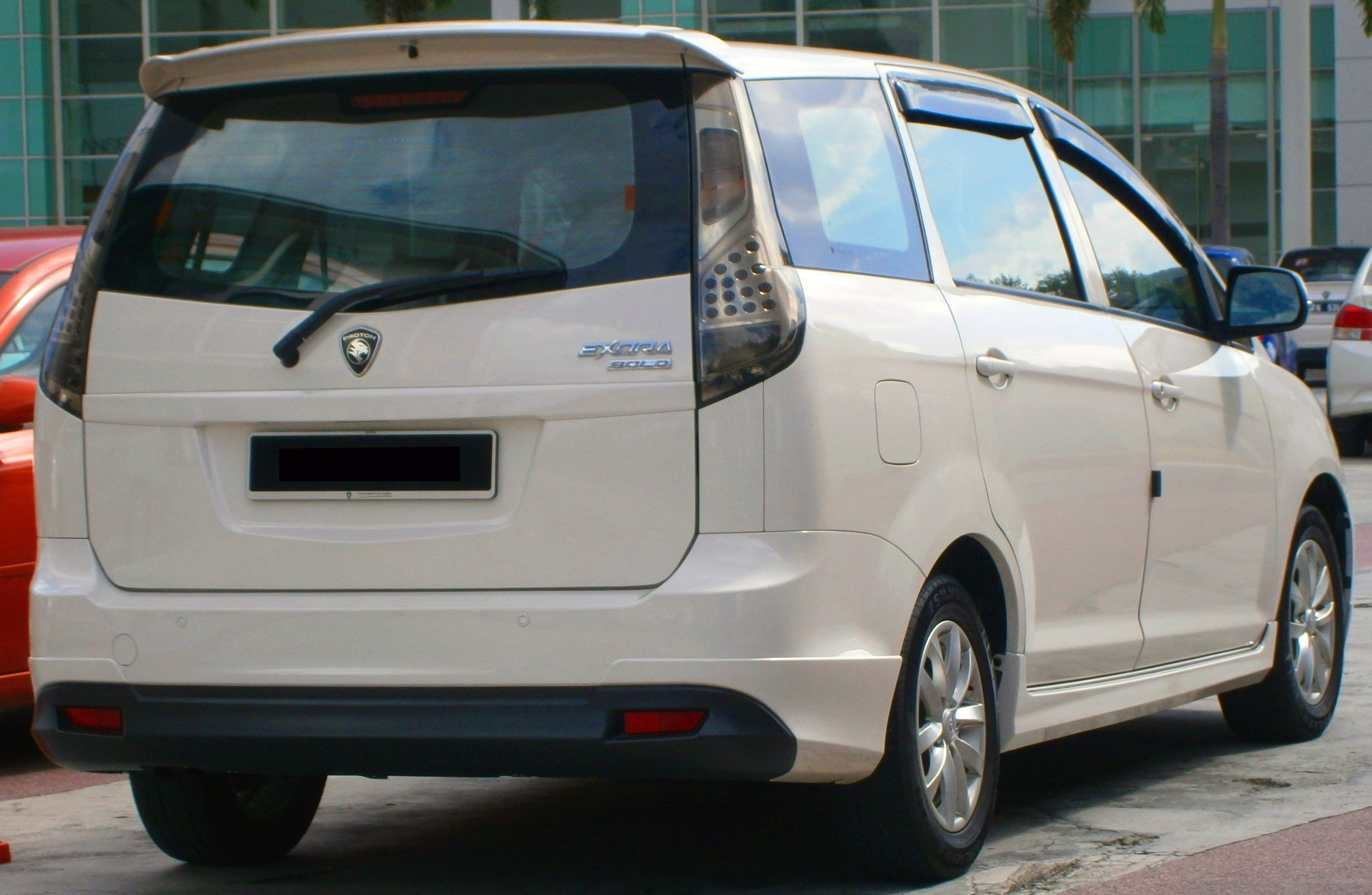
2012 Proton Exora Bold Executive CPS

Proton conceived of a turbocharged Exora in an effort to uphold its place in the market. The company launched the car on December 15, 2011, as two facelift models: the Exora Bold and Exora Prime. The Exora Bold is available in three variants, including the Exora Bold Executive MT, Exora Bold Executive AT and Exora Bold Premium CVT, while the Exora Prime was available in one, high-end luxury trim. The Exora Bold Premium and Exora Prime are powered by Proton's new CamPro CFE engine, which was developed in house by Proton and Lotus. CFE stands for "Charged Fuel Efficiency." The facelifted Exora became the first Malaysian car to feature a turbocharged engine.

In form of new bumper, the Exora Bold Executive is the facelift model of Exora M-Line. It is still powered by Proton's non-turbocharged CamPro CPS engine.

The Exora Bold Premium shares much of its exterior and interior features with the Exora Bold Executive, but is powered by Proton's new CamPro CFE turbocharged engine and a CVT transmission.

On January 11, 2013, Proton introduced a no frills version of the CFE powered Exora known as Proton Exora Bold 1.6 CFE Standard. It was launched to appeal to mass potential buyers by offering no additional accessories, but with standard CFE engine, CVT transmission and ABS + EBD. With a marginally lower price tag, it slots in between the Exora Bold Executive and Exora Bold Premium. Although eventually, the Executive variant stopped its production to make way for this standard variant.

The Exora Prime is the most expensive variant available. It is technically identical to the Exora Bold Premium but offers far superior levels of luxury. The major distinguishing features of this car would be the captain seats in the second row, dual headrest LCDs and a unique color option, Absolute Brown.

=== Exora Bold (MC2) (2015–2017) ===
Photos of facelifted Exora Bold circulated on social media network in December 2014. The changes merely on cosmetic aspect. The SP variant design cues reminded to the Livina X-Gear crossover hues.

There are 5 variants of the Exora Bold MC2, with a choice of either CPS or CFE engine depending on variant choice. The first 2 CPS variants are the MT and AT Standard model. The other 3 CFE variants are Executive, Premium and Super Premium (SP) which are all in form of automatic CVT transmission. The launching of MC2 also marked the reappearance of AT CPS Exora while the Exora Prime CVT model was discontinued. Electronic Stability Control (ESC), rear fog lamp and two side airbags were introduced in both Premium and Super Premium variants.

The 2013 to 2014 Standard CFE CVT variant specifications are identical to 2015 to 2017 Executive variant.

In 2016, the Standard CPS model was dropped and sometime between 2016 and 2017 Proton quietly discontinued the Super Premium (SP) variants leaving the Executive and Premium variants. For the first time in the Proton Exora history, the only engine choice was Proton's turbocharged CFE engine.

=== Exora (Enhanced) (2017–2019) ===
The 2017 Proton Exora (Enhanced) was introduced on July 23, 2017 as the successor to the Exora Bold MC2. The 2017 Exora introduced mainly cosmetic changes along with noise, vibration, and harshness (NVH) enhancements. The model range was also streamlined to two trim levels, namely the Executive and Executive Plus. The exterior design of the 2017 Exora has been updated to feature Proton's new three-dimensional badge, in line with the company's recently launched models.

The existing CamPro 1.6L Turbo engine and CVT powertrain has also been carried over, but it now sits on a new three-mount configuration, designed to reduce transmissions of engine vibrations into the cabin.

=== Exora (RC) (2019–2022) ===
The 2019 Proton Exora RC (running change) was introduced on 28 May 2019. Two variants are offered: Executive and Premium. The Exora follows the Iriz and Persona with several changes in the cabin. The Premium variant meanwhile has a head unit that runs GKUI with Proton's Hi Proton voice recognition feature. Its exterior doesn't follow the latest Proton design language although the replacement of the bee-sting antenna with a shark fin antenna and the removal of side moldings did occur.

Executive variants now shares the same Inspira like wheels as the Premium variant but only finished in single tone and the rear trim garnish is finished in chrome opposed to glossy black.

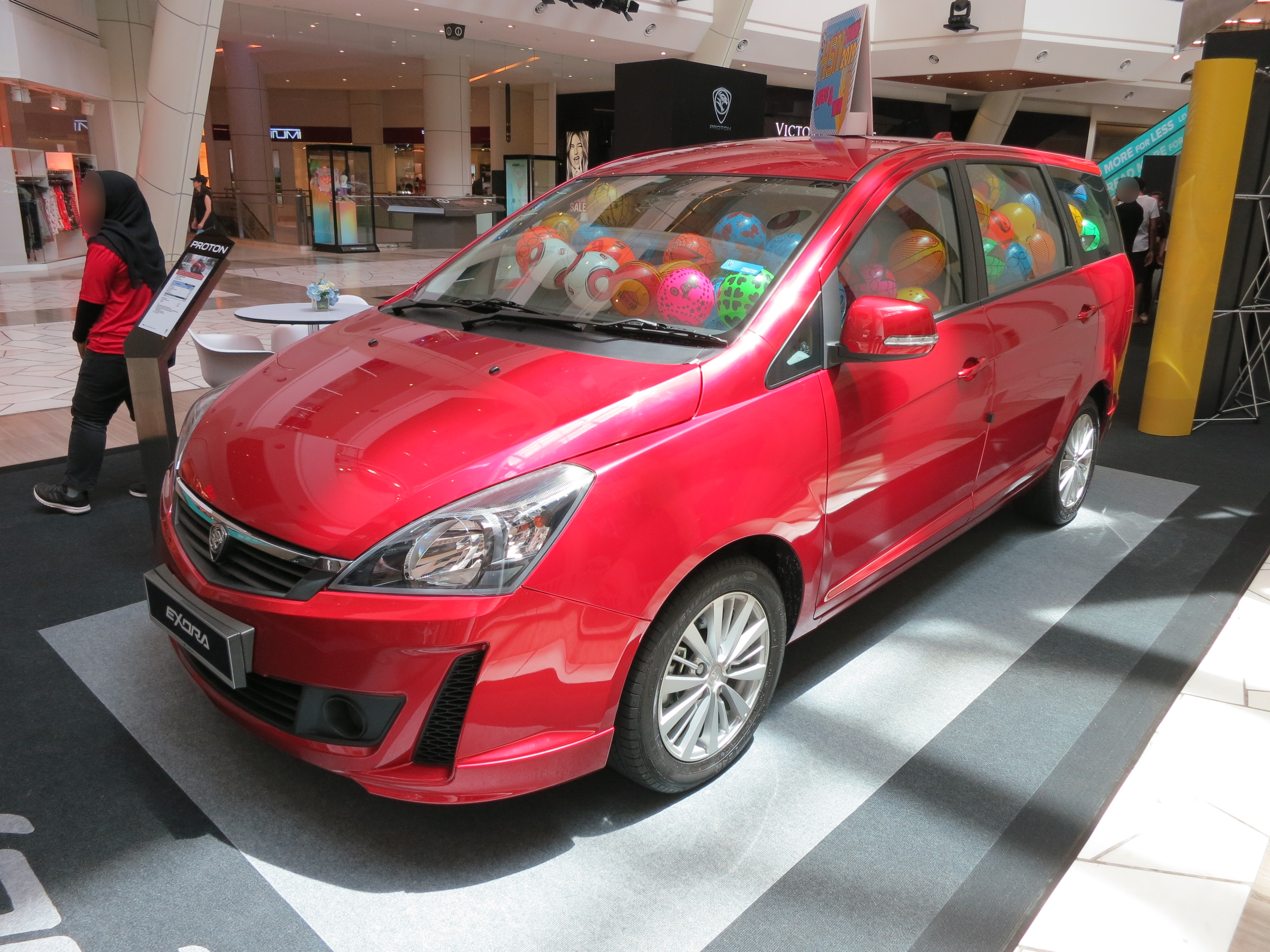
Executive

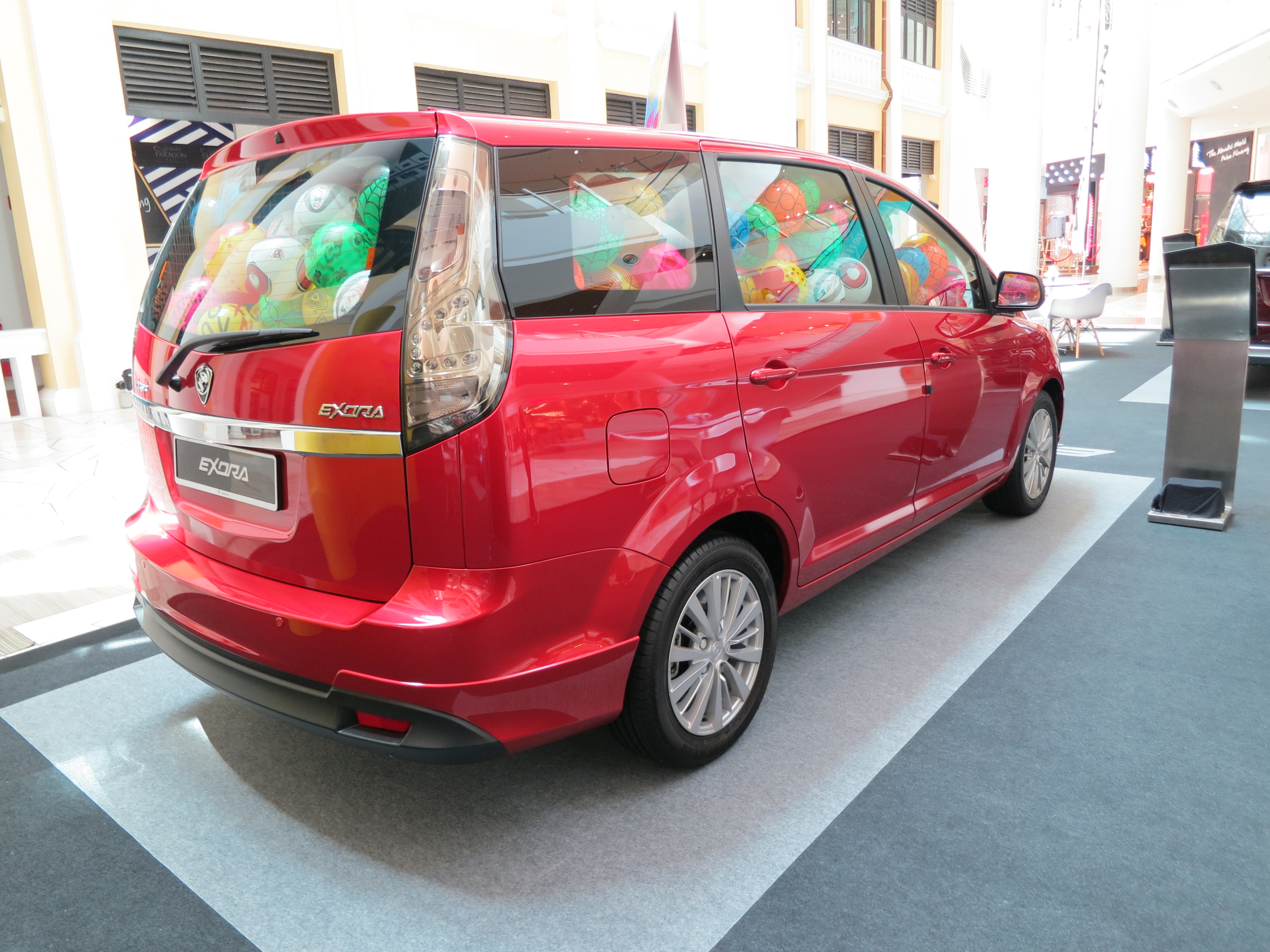
Executive

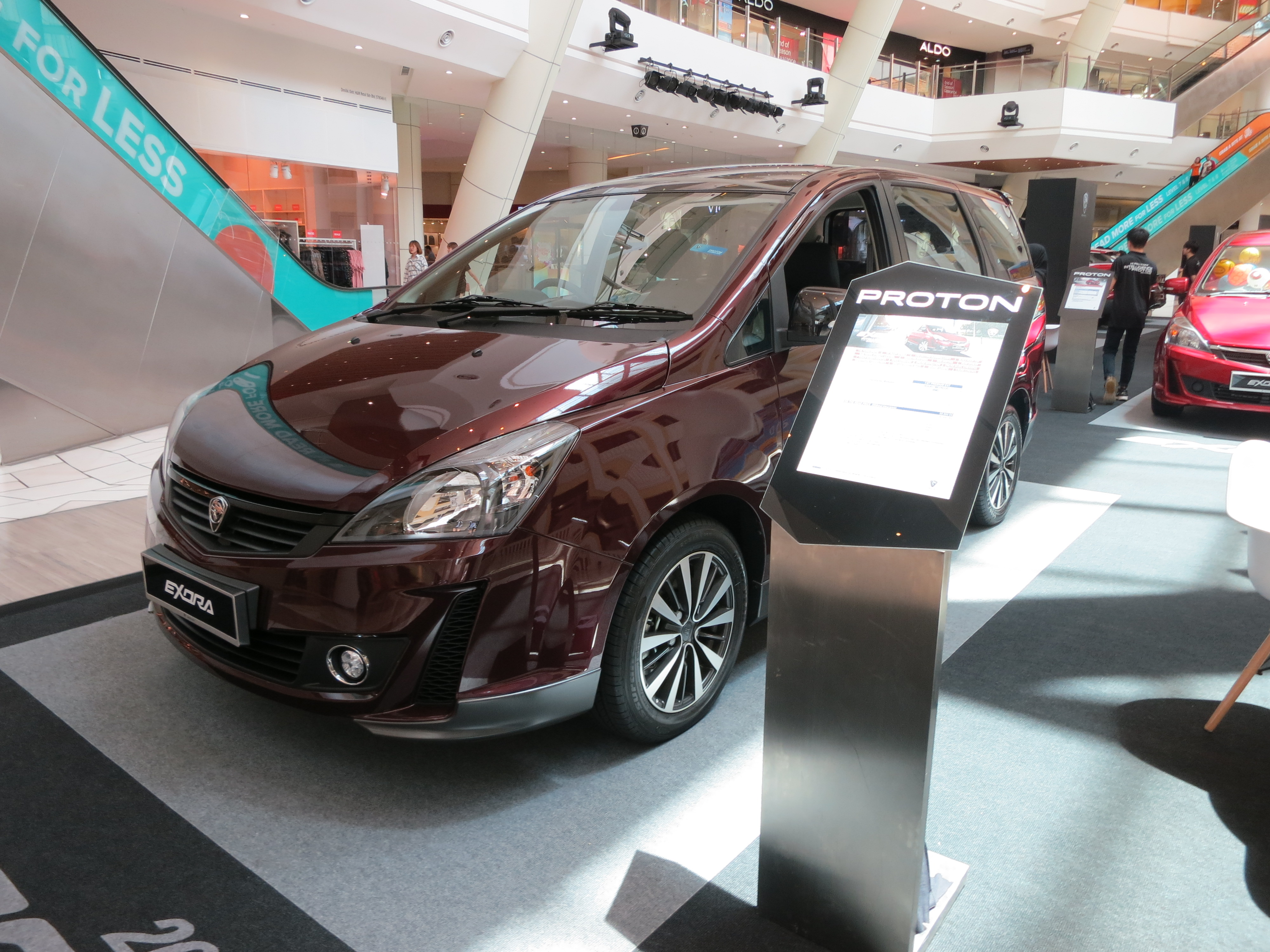
Premium

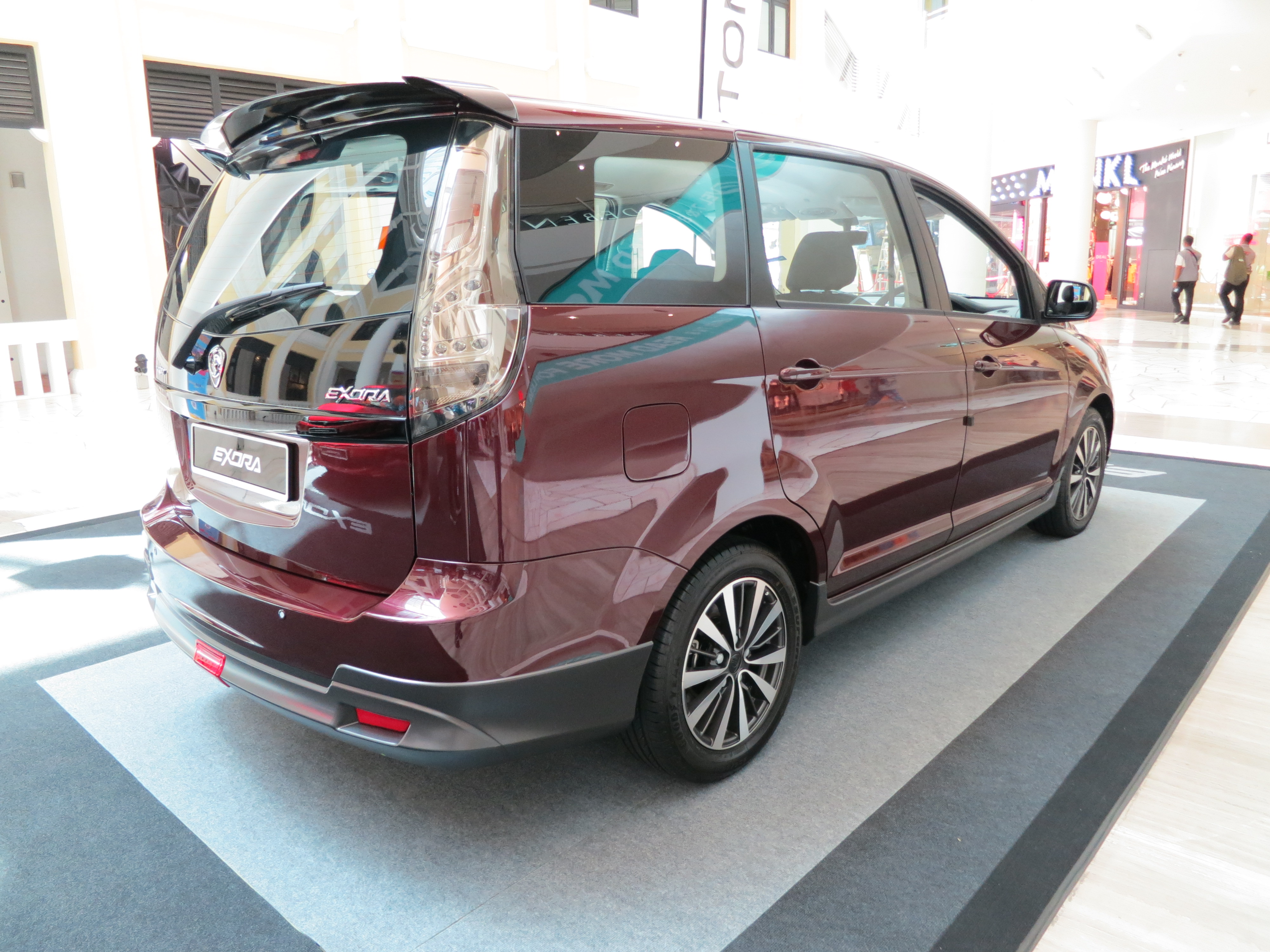
Premium

=== Exora (RC2) (2022–2023) ===
The 2023 Proton Exora (running change 2) was introduced on 19 August 2022, available in two variants: Executive and Premium. The exterior featured Proton's latest logo, and both variants included ESC as a standard safety feature. The Premium variant upgraded its seat upholstery from semi-leatherette to full-leatherette and removed the rear fog lamp.

The engine received a redesigned oil cooler hose to address a previously identified issue of premature failure.

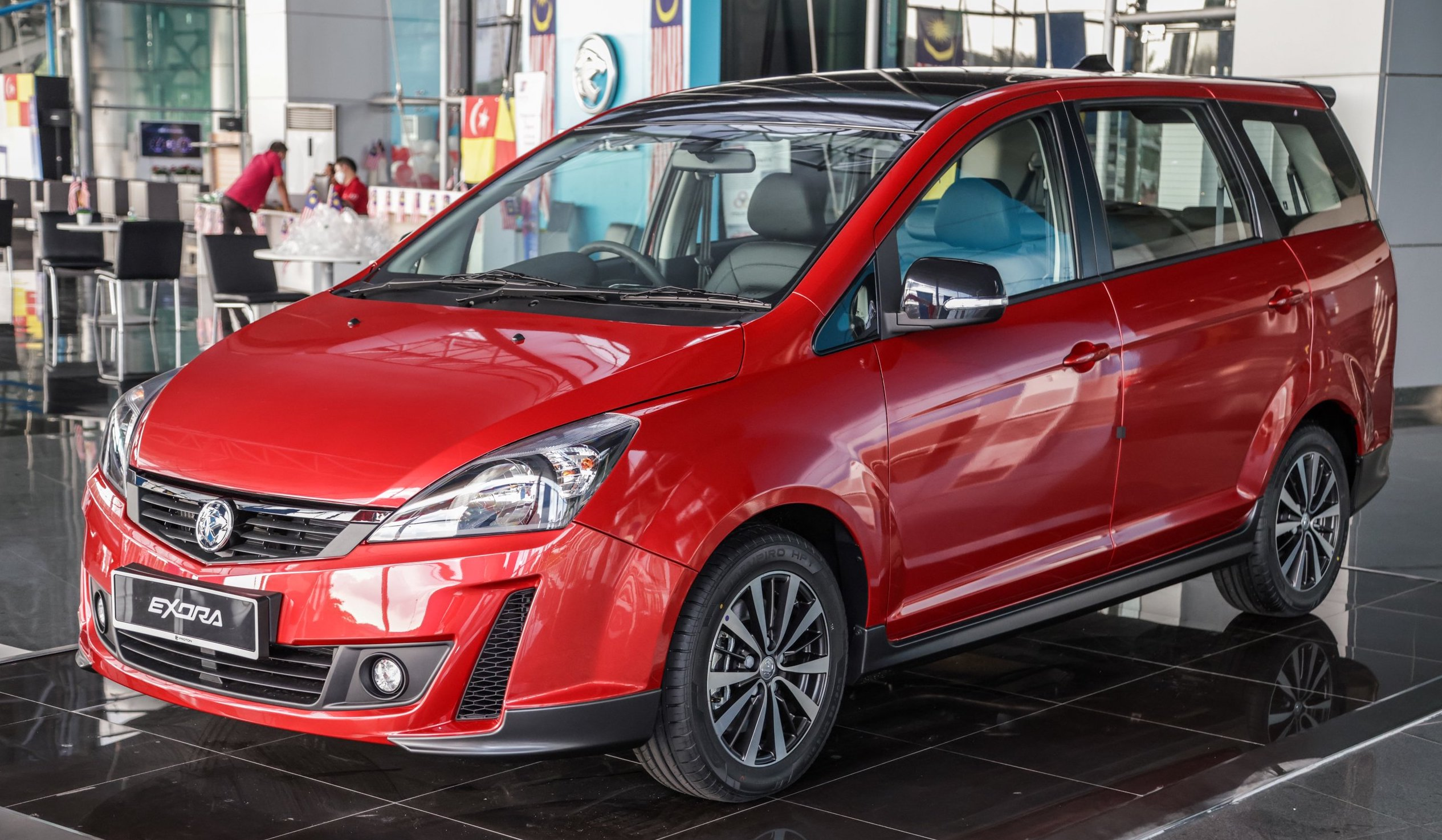
Premium (Front)

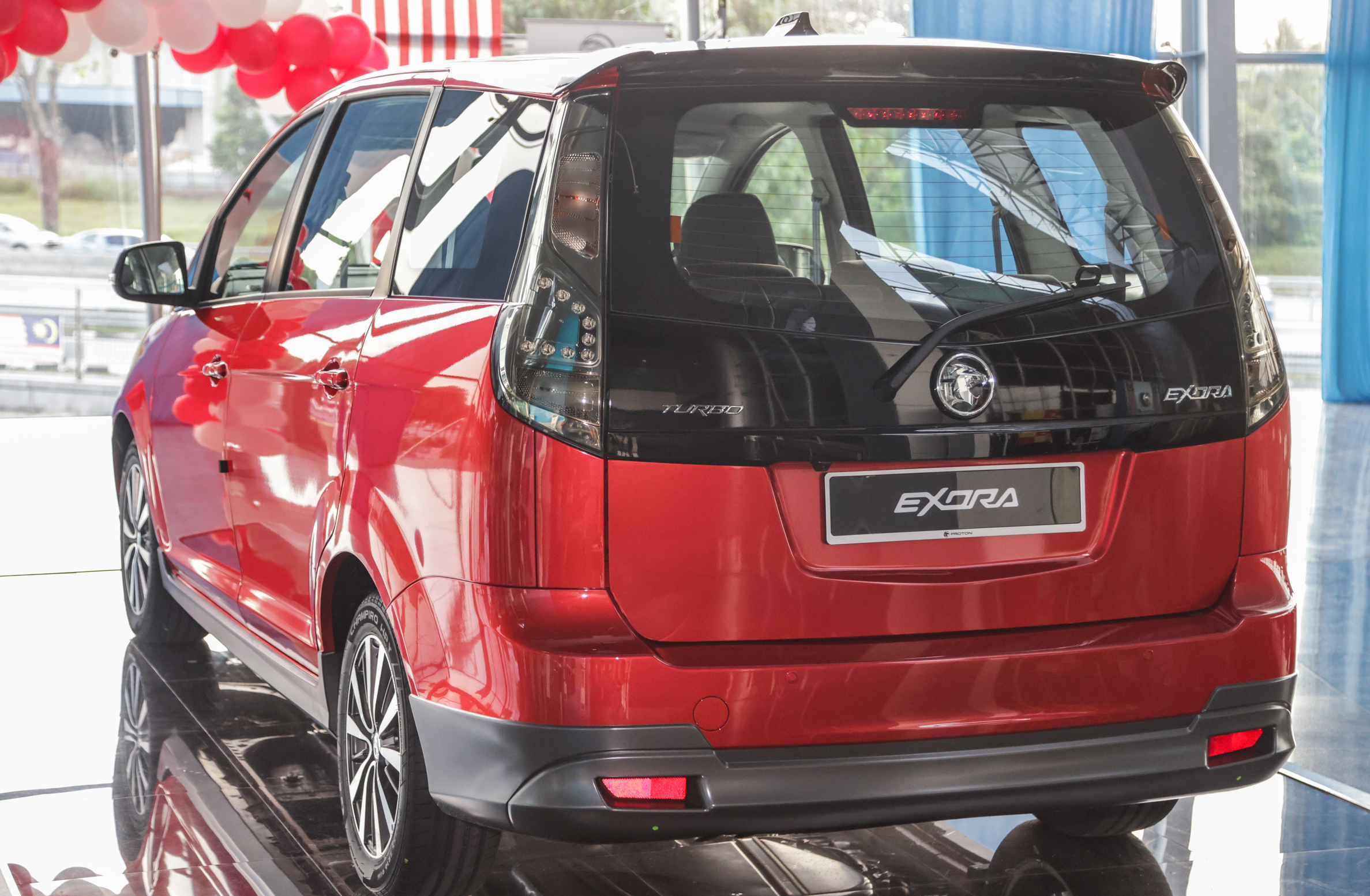
Premium (Rear)

== Specifications ==
=== Powertrain ===
Throughout the Proton Exora production, two engines have been available: A 1.6L naturally aspirated CPS engine and a 1.6L turbocharged CFE engine.

Manufacturer's claims
| Engine | CamPro CPS | CamPro CFE |
|---|---|---|
| Engine Configuration | I4 DOHC 16V | I4 DOHC 16V |
| Compression ratio | 10:1 | 10:1 |
| Total displacement (cc) | 1,597 cc (97.5 cu in) | 1,561 cc (95.3 cu in) |
| Bore x stroke (mm x mm) | 76.0 x 88.0 | 76.0 x 86.0 |
| Maximum output | 93 kW (125 hp; 126 PS) / 6,500 rpm | 103 kW (138 hp; 140 PS) / 5,000 rpm |
| Maximum torque | 150 N⋅m (15.3 kg⋅m; 111 lb⋅ft) / 4,500 rpm | 205 N⋅m (20.9 kg⋅m; 151 lb⋅ft) / 2,000–4,000 rpm |

=== Suspension ===
The Proton Exora uses MacPherson strut with coil spring on the front and torsion beam with coil spring for the rear.

=== Steering ===
The Proton Exora uses a rack & pinion hydraulic power steering system and has a turning radius of 5.4 metres (18 ft).

== Export markets ==
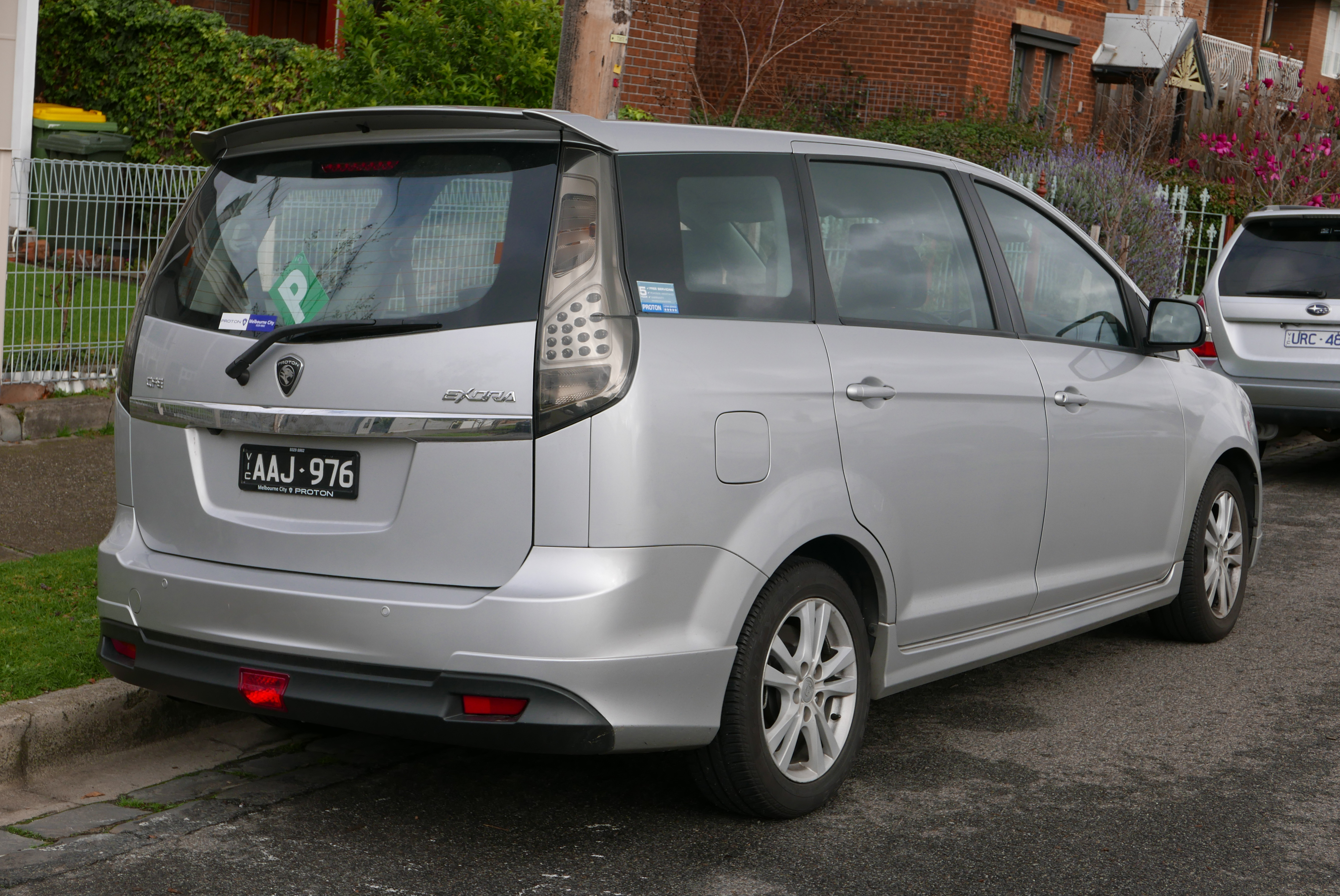
Proton Exora GXR (Australia)

Proton exports the Exora to neighbour Indonesia, Thailand, Singapore, Brunei and Australia. The Proton Exora launched in Thailand during the 2009 Thailand International Motor Expo. Despite being a newcomer and facing stiff competition from rival Japanese makes, the Exora received critical acclaim from the Thais, scoring 1,388 bookings out of a total 25,220 placed at the event. Exora is Proton's best selling car in Thailand. In 2012, Proton replaced the Exora with the new Exora CFE for the Indonesian, Thai and Singaporean markets. The Exora CFE was previewed in Australia during the 2012 Australian International Motor Show. It will become Australia's cheapest MPV when it went on sale in mid-2013. The Exora CFE also had a planned 2012 launch in the United Kingdom, but no such launch has occurred yet. A future launch in China and other left-hand drive markets are also anticipated, as there is evidence of left-hand drive Exora CFE testing units.

In July 2015, Proton signed a distributor agreement with Andes Motor, and the first left-hand drive Prevé and Exora evaluation units were shipped to Chile in November. The official launch of the Proton Exora in Chile was tentatively pegged at May 2016.

The Exora is also sold in Egypt with two variants: Executive and Premium. Both variants are powered by Proton's CFE engine paired to a CVT transmission. The specifications is similar to that of the Malaysian market Exora Bold (MC2). A batch of Proton cars including the Exora departed Malaysia in September 2018 and arrived in Egypt in October 2018.

== Concepts ==
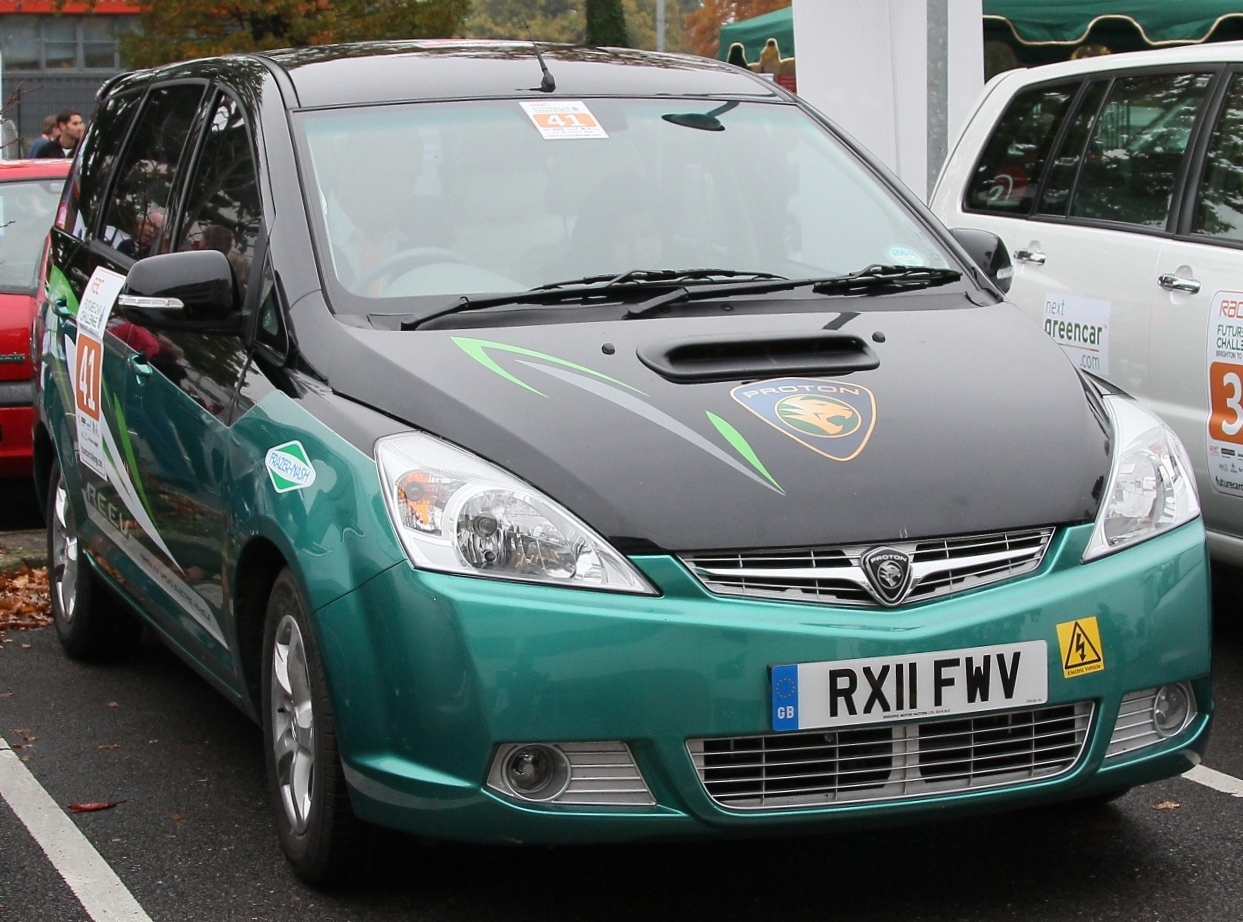
The Proton Exora REEV during the RAC Future Car Challenge 2011, United Kingdom

Proton also showcased two concept models by Proton Design during the launch ceremony, the Exora Prime and Exora Prestige. The Exora Prime concept featured mostly cosmetic exterior and interior upgrades over the regular Exora, several of which made it into production two years later in the 2012 Exora Prime. The Exora Prestige variant on the other hand offered far superior levels of luxury and kit in an effort to gauge its potential as a vehicle fit for VIPs. It offered a built-in office working table, fridge and intercom, as well as a 19-inch LCD TV and a seat massaging system among others. Proton later revealed that the Exora Prestige was indeed being made and sold to selected VIPs.

On 16 July 2009, Proton showcased the Proton Exora Turbo concept at Universiti Putra Malaysia, Serdang. It housed a CamPro CPS engine fitted with various aftermarket performance parts, offering 270 hp and 350Nm of torque, a massive jump from the stock CamPro CPS engine which could only put out 125 hp and 150Nm of torque.

Proton participated in the RAC Future Car Challenge on 6 November 2011 with plug-in electric versions of the Exora, Saga and Persona, in which the company claimed two awards despite their shortcomings.

In 2015, the Proton Pick-up Concept was showcased to the public twice. This concept is based on the Exora and is reminiscent of the Proton Arena, Proton's last and only pick-up truck.

== Competition ==
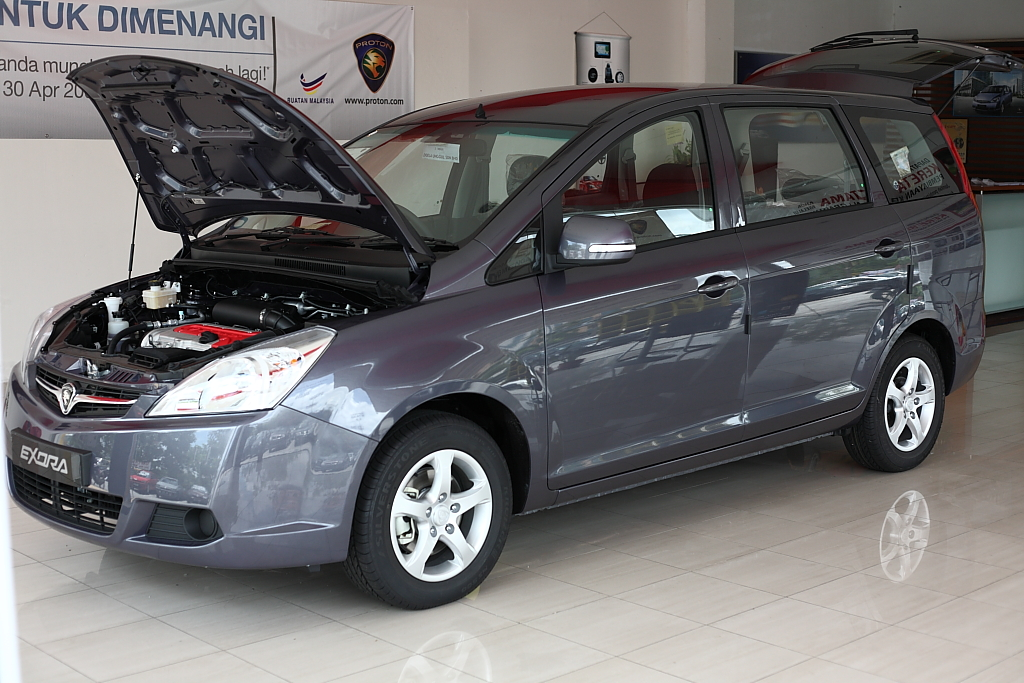
2009 Proton Exora

Prior the launch of the Exora, the budget MPV segment in Malaysia was monopolized by the Toyota Avanza, Toyota Innova and Nissan Grand Livina. Unlike the Juara, the Exora was a true winner, and has since been consistently positioned among the Top 10 best selling vehicles in Malaysia.

Following the launch of the Proton Exora in April 2009, Perodua, which had also been developing a MPV since early 2008 previewed the Alza on 6 June 2009, a smaller, less powerful and thus less expensive MPV to counter sales of the Exora. Perodua opted to simply rebadge the Daihatsu Boon Luminas. The Perodua Alza had a planned November 2009 launch, but Proton took advantage of the delay and introduced cheaper variants of the Exora in an effort to entice potential Alza buyers. Despite Proton's best efforts, the largely cheaper Alza outsold the Exora by a significant margin, and the former replaced the latter as Malaysia's best selling MPV from 2010 and onwards.

== Safety ==
- (Malaysia) - MyVAP -

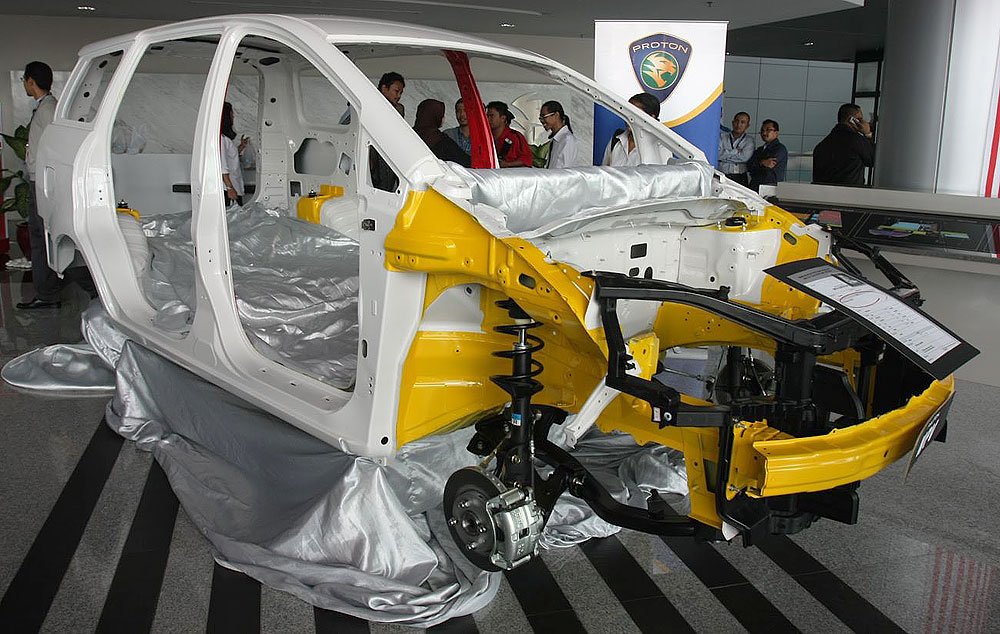
The high tensile steel frame, exhibited at Proton Technology Week

The Exora has an equivalent 4-star Euro NCAP rating after 32 Exoras were crashed at the Applus+ IDIADA crash testing facility in Spain. Additionally, the Exora was awarded a 4-star rating by Malaysia's own MyVAP evaluation program. The Exora was given a four-star ANCAP safety rating, applicable to all variants. The MPV, which is equipped with dual frontal and side airbags with thorax and head protection for front occupants, scored 26.37 out of a possible 37 points. In the offset crash test, the Exora scored 10.55 out of 16 points – driver chest protection was acceptable and leg protection was marginal. In the side impact crash test, it managed 14.82 out of 16 points – driver chest protection was listed as acceptable. The Exora result – with testing carried out in July 2013 – reflected its performance in the 40% frontal offset test, where the risk of serious injury to the driver's legs was high. Side impact performance was good, but overall pedestrian test results were poor, according to ANCAP. One of the key features that made these ratings possible is the use of high tensile steel for the body cage, providing better stability and increased impact absorption during a collision. Side impact bars are also installed to reinforce the door frames and to absorb impacts from both sides.

Safety features (Note: Legend Blue : Standard across all trim levels. Green : Available on selected trim level(s) only, full package. Yellow : Available on selected trim level(s) only, but is not the full package. Red : Not available on selected trim level(s), or is the no-frills package.)
| Variant | Exora | | | | Exora MC | | | Exora Bold and Exora Prime | | | | | Exora Bold MC2 | | | | Exora MC3 | | Exora RC | |
| Variant | B-LINE | M-LINE | H-LINE | 25th Anniversary Edition | B-LINE | M-LINE | H-LINE | Exora 1.6 Standard | Executive | Exora 1.6 CFE Standard | Premium | Prime | Standard | Executive | Premium | Super Premium | Executive | Executive Plus | Executive | Premium |
|---|---|---|---|---|---|---|---|---|---|---|---|---|---|---|---|---|---|---|---|---|
| Market | (Malaysia) | | | | | | | | | | | | | | | | | | | |
| ABS + EBD + BA | ✘ | ✔ | | | ✘ | ✔ | | ✘ | ✔ | | | | | | | | | | | |
| ESC | ✘ | | | | | | | | | | | | | | ✔ | | ✘ | ✔ | ✘ | ✔ |
| Airbags | 1 | 2 | | | 1 | 2 | | 1 | 2 | | | | | | 4 | | 2 | | | |

ANCAP test results* Proton Exora (2013)
| Test | Score |
|---|---|
| Overall | 4 /5 stars |
| Frontal offset | 10.55/16 |
| Side impact | 14.82/16 |
| Pole | Not Assessed |
| Seat belt reminders | 1/3 |
| Whiplash protection | Marginal |
| Pedestrian protection | Marginal |
| Electronic stability control | Standard |

== Sales ==
| Year | Malaysia (Note: Figures based on registration) |
|---|---|
| 2009 | 18,083 |
| 2010 | 26,101 |
| 2011 | 21,039 |
| 2012 | 24,112 |
| 2013 | 22,816 |
| 2014 | 15,594 |
| 2015 | 13,314 |
| 2016 | 6,653 |
| 2017 | 5,461 |
| 2018 | 3,874 |
| 2019 | 5,451 |
| 2020 | 5,775 |
| 2021 | 4,031 |
| 2022 | 4,270 |
| 2023 | 4,473 |

Proton Exora sales between 2009 and Q1 2014
| Country | Total | Q1 2014 | 2013 | 2012 | 2011 | 2010 | 2009 |
|---|---|---|---|---|---|---|---|
| Malaysia | 117,746 | 4,348 | 22,983 | 24,113 | 21,064 | 26,787 | 18,451 |
| Indonesia | | | 1,066 | 1,529 | 1,149 | 1,038 | |
| Thailand | | | 212 | 1,435 | 1,762 | 2,399 | 31 |
| Australia | 102 | 52 | 50 | | | | |
| Singapore | | | | | | | |
| Brunei | | | | | | | |
| Total global sales | 129,000+ | | | | | | |
Note: Q1 2014 only includes sales for January, February & March 2014.

== Discontinuation ==
In May 2023, it was announced that the production of the Exora would end by late 2023, as the successor to the MPV remains unknown. The final Exora left the production line in October 2023 after 14 years, totaling 196,583 units. In February 2024, the Exora was removed from Proton's official website, as the model's remaining inventory had been sold out entirely.
