= Proton Saga (second generation) =

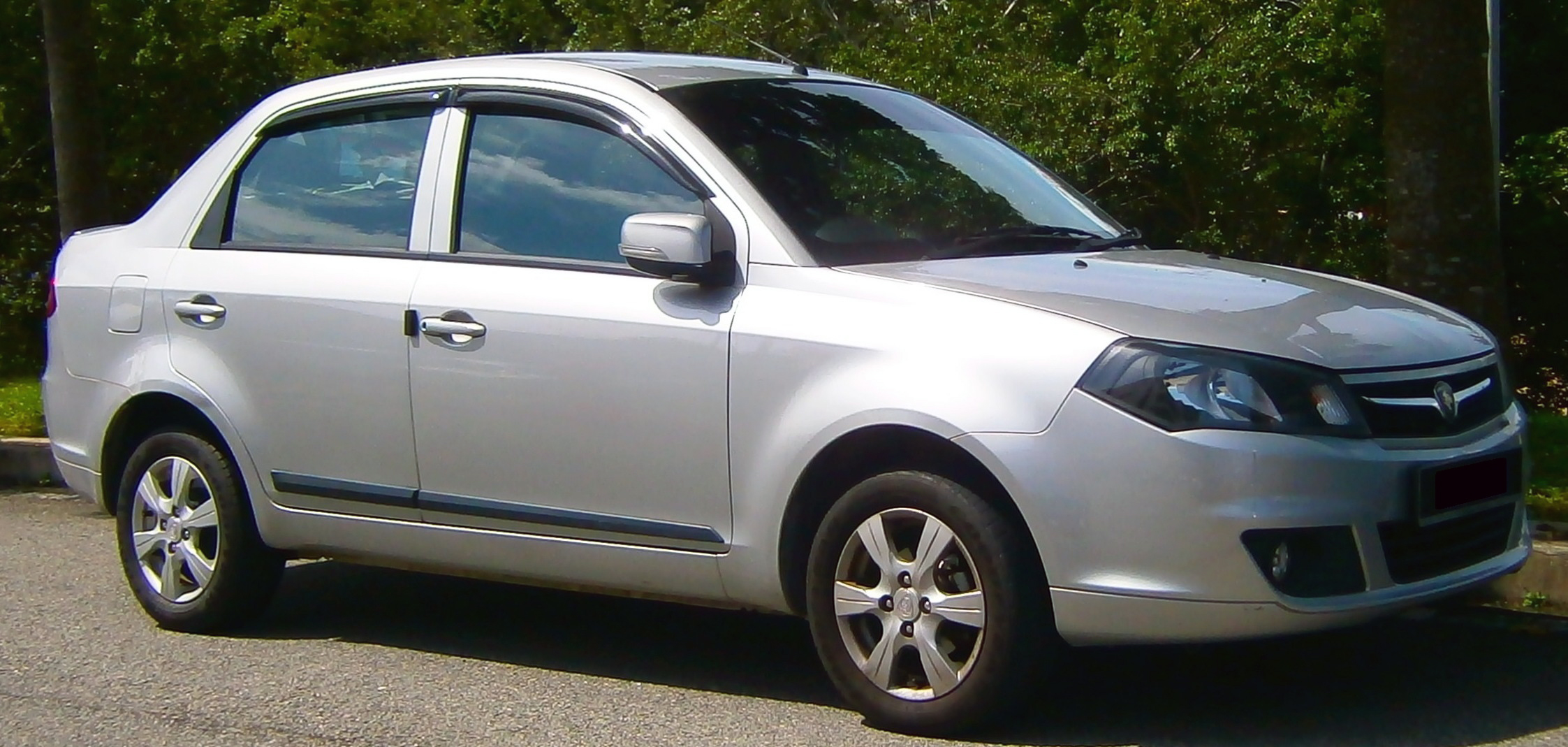
- Proton Saga FLX

Overview
- Manufacturer: Proton
- Also called: Proton S16 (Australia)
- Production: January 2008 – September 2016
- Assembly: Malaysia: Shah Alam (PONSB)

Body and chassis
- Class: B-segment
- Body style: 4-door saloon
- Layout: FF

Chronology
- Predecessor: Proton Saga (first generation)
- Successor: Proton Saga (third generation)

The second generation Proton Saga is a four-door subcompact saloon produced by Malaysian car manufacturer Proton which launched on 18 January 2008. It succeeds the first generation Proton Saga as the company's mainstay. The second generation Proton Saga is based on a stretched Proton Savvy platform and was developed in-house by Proton with technical support from Lotus Cars and LG CNS.

Proton launched a mid-life facelift model called the Proton Saga FL on 30 November 2010. A further improved model called the Proton Saga FLX was launched eight months later.

The second-generation Saga was succeeded by the third-generation Saga in September 2016. Over 500,000 units of the second generation Saga were produced.

== Proton Saga BLM (2008–2010) ==
Proton Saga BLM
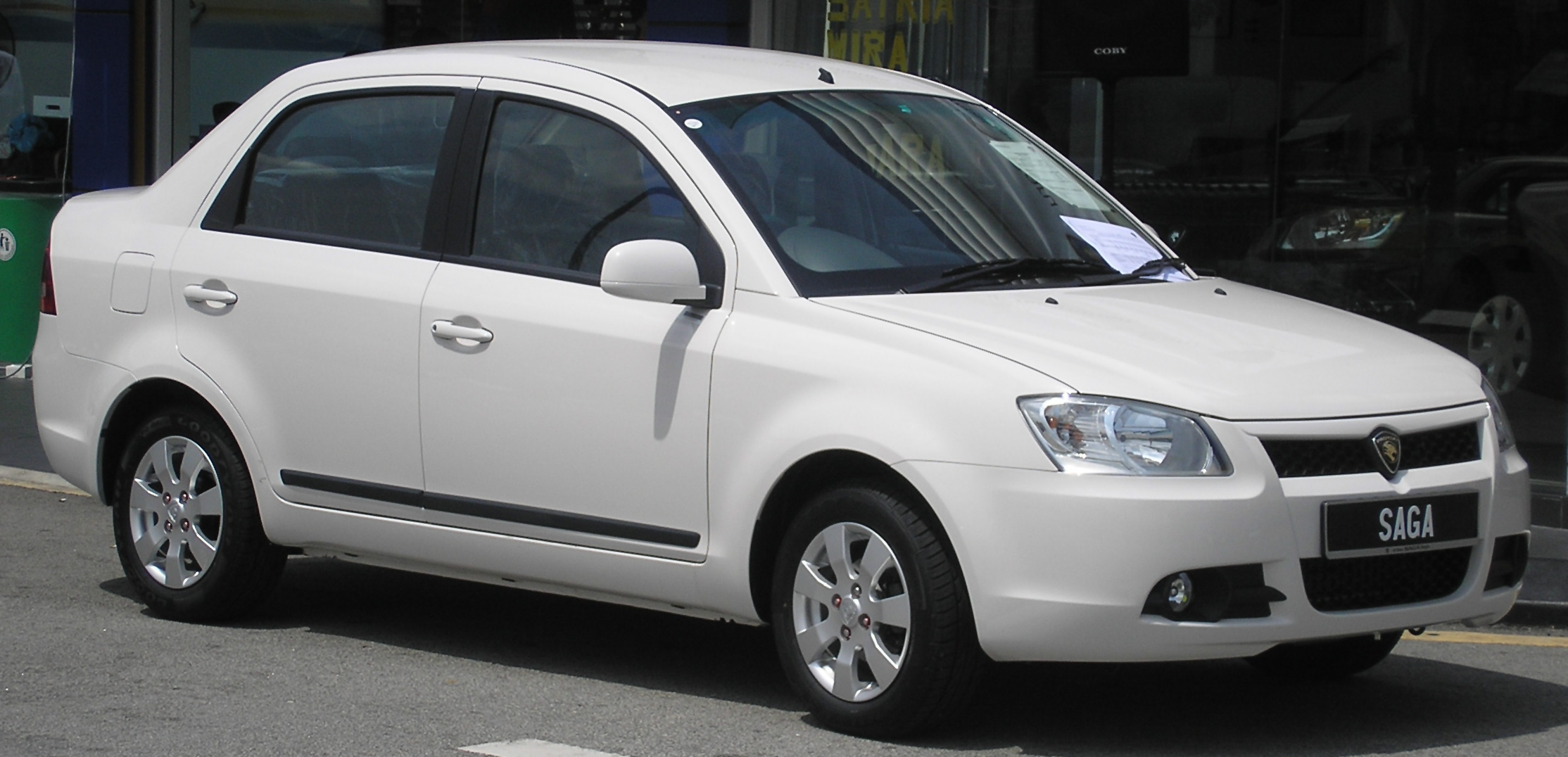

Overview
- Production: January 2008 – December 2010

Powertrain
- Engine: 1.3 L CamPro IAFM DOHC I4; 1.6 L CamPro IAFM DOHC I4
- Transmission: 5-speed manual 4-speed automatic

Dimensions
- Wheelbase: 2,465 mm (97.0 in)
- Length: 4,257 mm (167.6 in)
- Width: 1,680 mm (66.1 in)
- Height: 1,502 mm (59.1 in)

The second generation Proton Saga, also called the Saga BLM (Base Line Model) launched on 18 January 2008. Previously, the first generation Saga was Proton's most successful model, having a 23-year-long lifespan, the longest of all Proton models to date. The second generation Saga was indigenously designed and became the first model to wear Proton's new corporate logo. It launched with 3 variants, the N-Line, B-Line and M-Line which were priced between RM31,498 and RM39,998 respectively. All variants were powered by Proton's 1.3 litre CamPro IAFM engine. Also showcased during the launch ceremony was a concept model called the Proton Saga RED. The new Saga was a great sales success for Proton, having received over 23,000 bookings in less than two weeks since launch. Furthermore, it replaced the older Saga Iswara as Malaysia's taxi of choice from 2008 to 2010. These taxi variants were equipped with more powerful 1.6 litre 110 bhp CamPro engines and were later converted to NGVs.

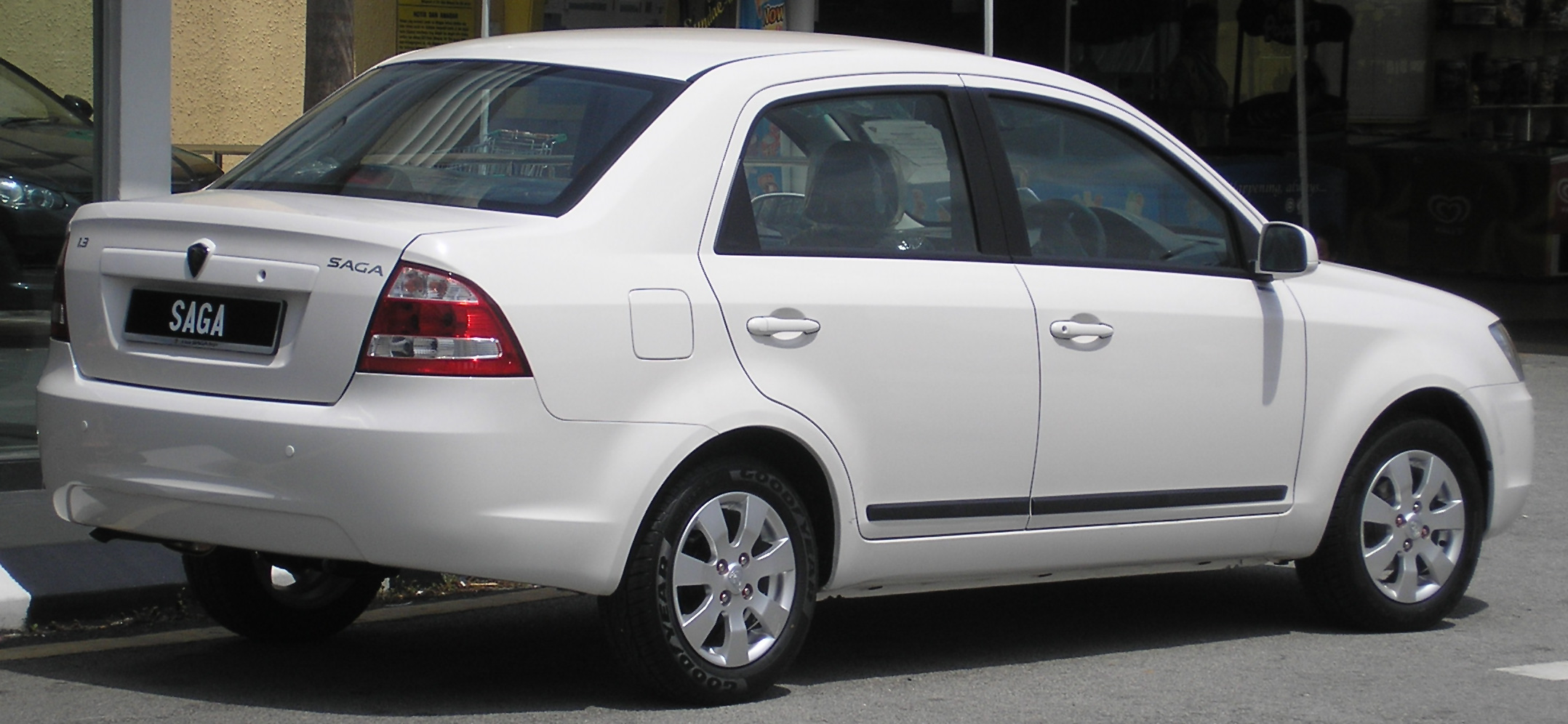
Rear view of the Proton Saga in Serdang, Malaysia.

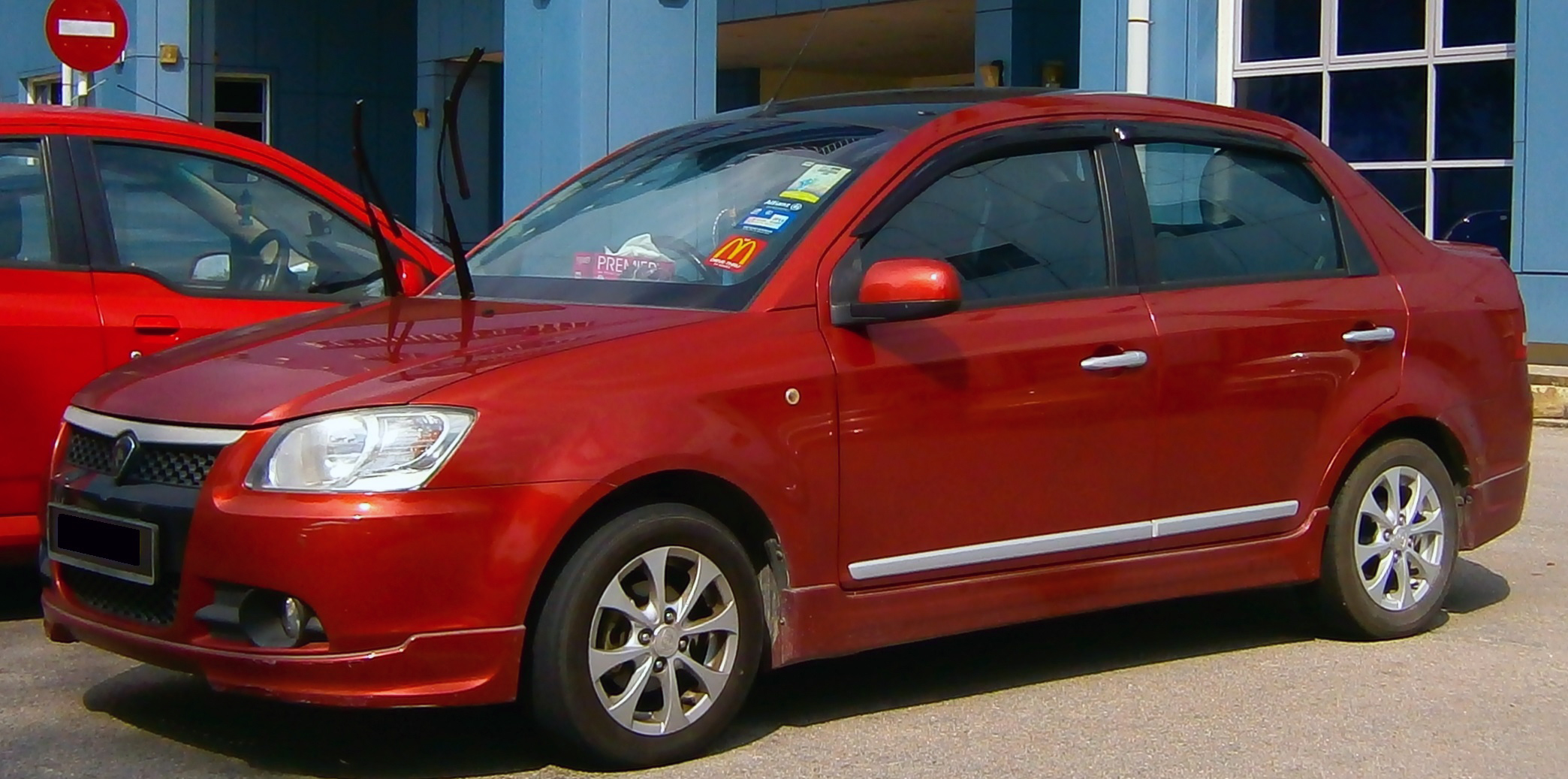
2009 Proton Saga SE Front (Cyberjaya, Malaysia)

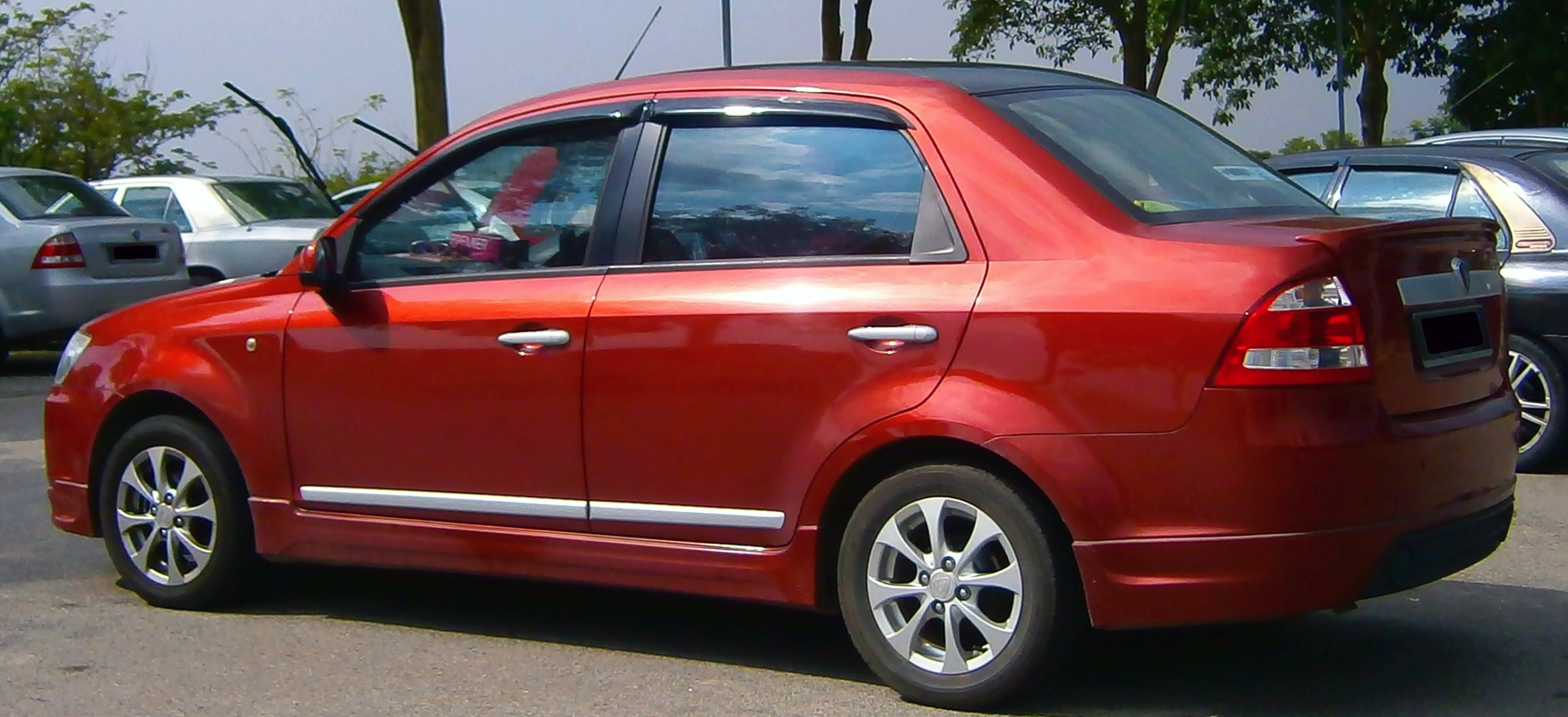
2009 Proton Saga SE Rear (Cyberjaya, Malaysia)

In June 2009, the Proton Saga 1.6 B-Line was launched. It shared the engine found in the Saga taxi variant, but lacked many features, including a driver's airbag. One month later, the Proton Saga SE meaning Special Edition was unveiled. Priced between RM43,000 and RM45,500, it was sold as a premium variant with just two colour options: Brilliant Red and Solid White. And it got a unique body kit, mated to the CamPro 1.3 engine found in the other models. On 16 July 2009, Proton unveiled the electric vehicle conversion version called the Saga EV Concept in Universiti Putra Malaysia, Serdang. It is powered by a 125 kW (168 hp) DC motor only mated to a 5 speed manual transmission, it had a maximum range of 109 kilometres (68 miles) and could be charged over a standard household outlet.

On the Christmas eve of 2009, Proton launched the S16 in the Australian market. There was no official reason why Proton chose to rename the Saga as the S16 in Australia. Nonetheless, the S16 is identical to its Malaysian counterpart, but featured the newer 110 bhp CamPro 1.6 engine instead. At the time, it retailed for AUD$11,990, making it the cheapest new car in the Australian market. That title has since been passed on to China's Chery J1. The launch of the S16 was endorsed by Miss Universe Australia beauty pageant Rachael Finch, Proton's official Australian ambassador for 2009.

In July 2010, a limited-edition model called the Proton Saga 25th Anniversary Edition was unveiled. Priced at RM54,500, it offered leather upholstery, dual airbags and quad power windows along with a custom set of alloy rims and paint job. Only 25 examples were made, in-line with Proton's 25 years of automotive history.

In Indonesia, only the M-Line variant is available, with either the manual or the automatic transmission, with a choice of seven colors: Solid White, Tranquility Black, Chili Red, Granite Grey, Genetic Silver, Mountain Blue, and Zircon Green. It comes with a 3-year or 100,000 km warranty.

== Proton Saga FL (2010–2011) ==
Proton Saga FL
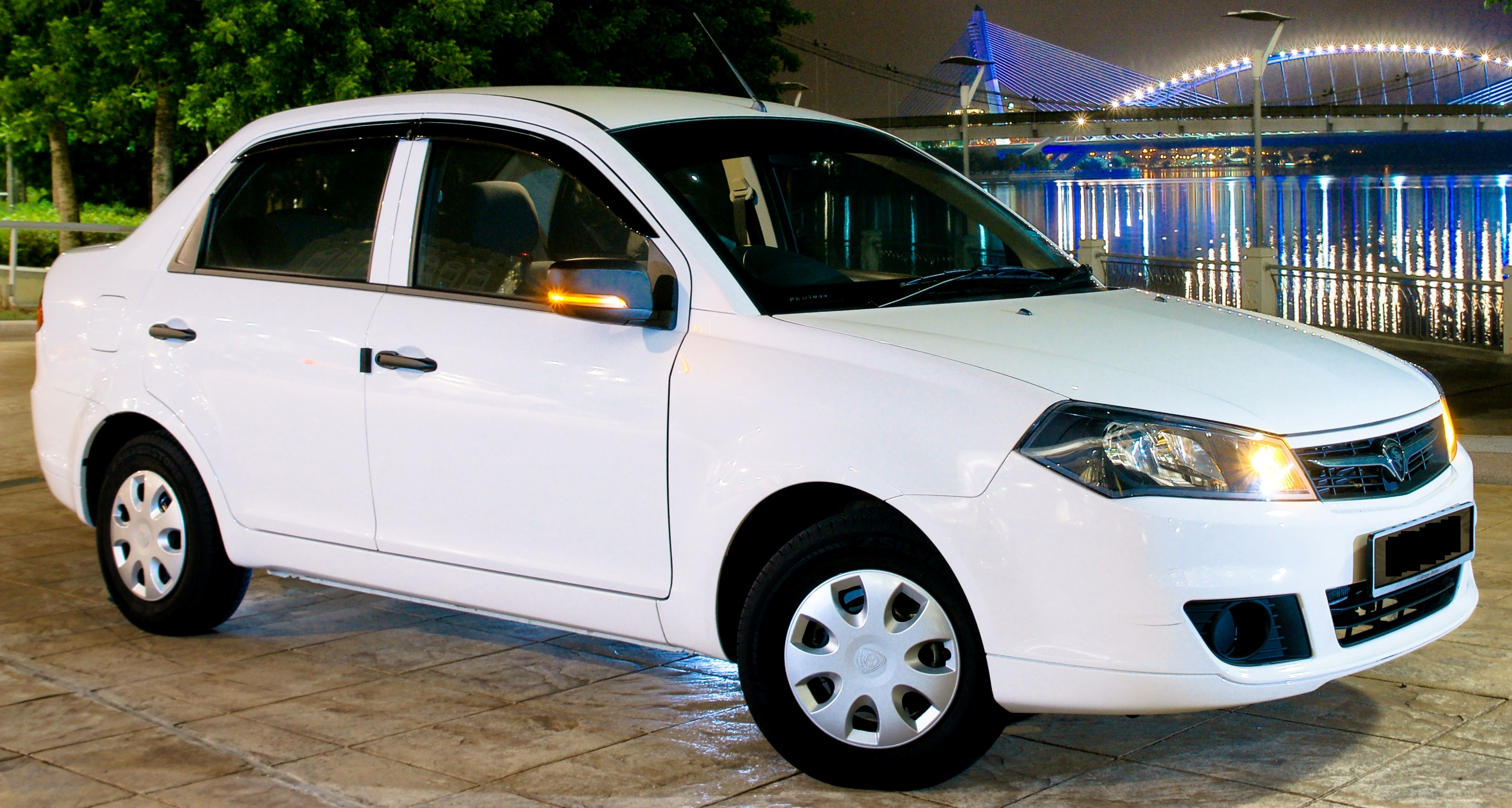

Overview
- Production: December 2010 – July 2011

Powertrain
- Engine: 1.3L CamPro IAFM DOHC I4; 1.6L CamPro IAFM DOHC I4
- Transmission: 5-speed manual 4-speed automatic

Dimensions
- Wheelbase: 2,465 mm (97.0 in)
- Length: 4,278 mm (168.4 in)
- Width: 1,680 mm (66.1 in)
- Height: 1,520 mm (59.8 in)
- Curb weight: 1,017 kg (2,242.1 lb) – 1,065 kg (2,347.9 lb)

On 30 November 2010, Proton unveiled a mid-life facelift of the Proton Saga at the Thai International Motor Expo 2010. It was called the Proton Saga FL, where 'FL' stood for facelift. The Saga FL received mostly exterior changes such a redesigned front and rear bumper, grille, rims, head lamps and tail lamps among others. The turn signal indicators were fused into the wing mirrors and the brake lamps utilised LED technology. Interior wise, the Saga FL included power windows for all four doors, a new Clarion audio system with USB and AUX ports, steering wheel audio controls, and dual airbags. The technical specifications for the Saga FL remain mostly unchanged from the pre-facelift Saga. Also present during the Saga FL launch in Thailand was the Saga R3 Concept. It was designed by Proton's Race, Rally, Research (R3) division and featured a sporty body kit, unique rims and custom paint job. Its technical specifications are not known. A couple of days later, the Proton Kasturi Concept was showcased at the 2010 Kuala Lumpur International Motor Show. The Saga FL- based Kasturi was created by Proton Design and many of its features later materialized in upcoming models.

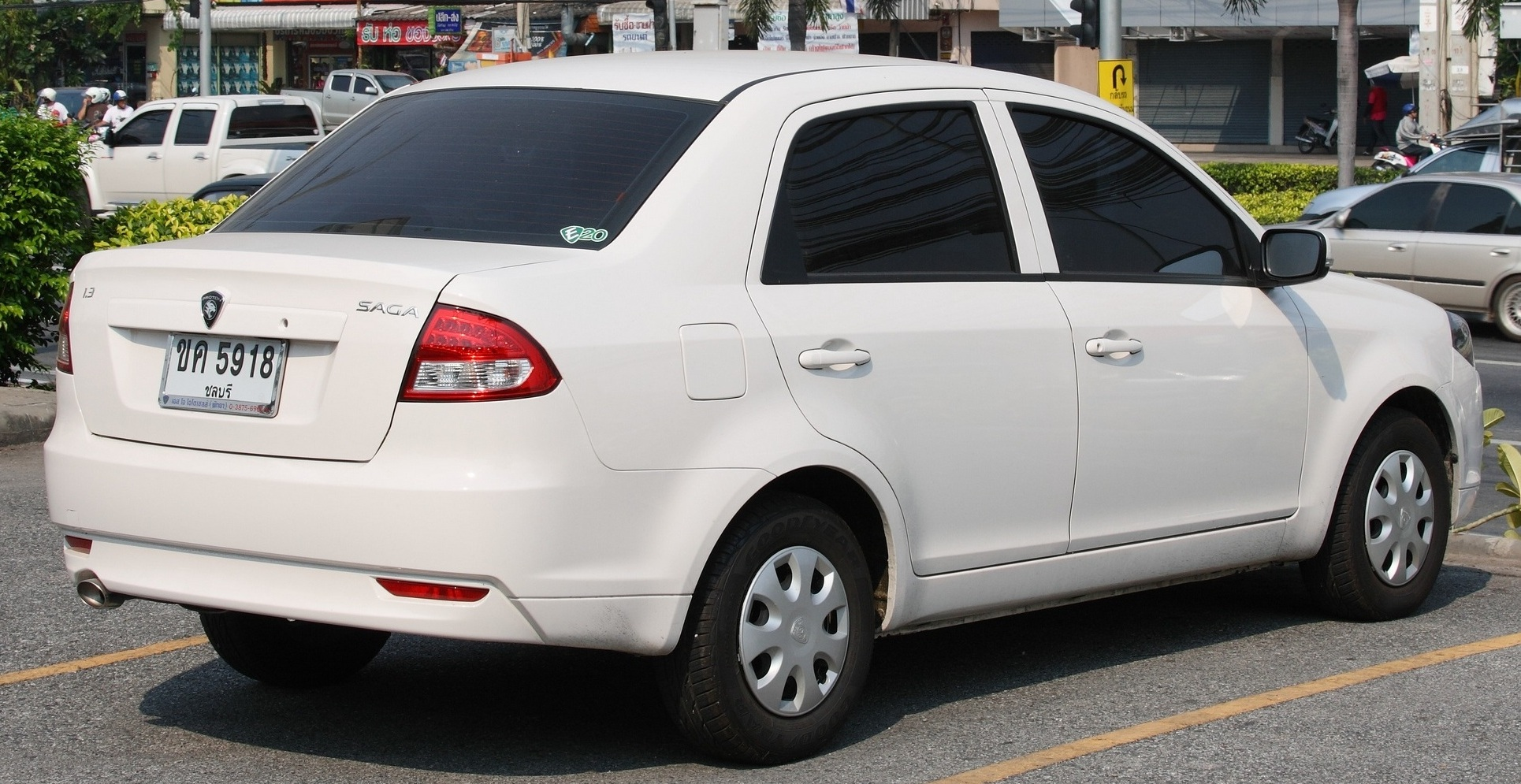
The facelifted Proton Saga in Pattaya, Thailand.

The Saga FL was launched in Malaysia two weeks after its Thai unveil. It was available in two trim lines for the Malaysian market, the Standard and Executive variants respectively. Both trim lines were available in 4-speed automatic and 5-speed manual transmissions. Every Proton Saga FL came standard with 4 power windows, a feature which was warmly welcome. Later in May 2011, a more powerful model called the Proton Saga FL 1.6 Executive was launched. As its name implies, it was powered by the 110 bhp CamPro IAFM 1.6 engine which could only be mated to the 4-speed automatic transmission. The Saga FL 1.6 came with unique alloy rims and body stickers to help distinguish it from the crowd.

== Proton Saga FLX (2011–2016) ==
Proton Saga FLX
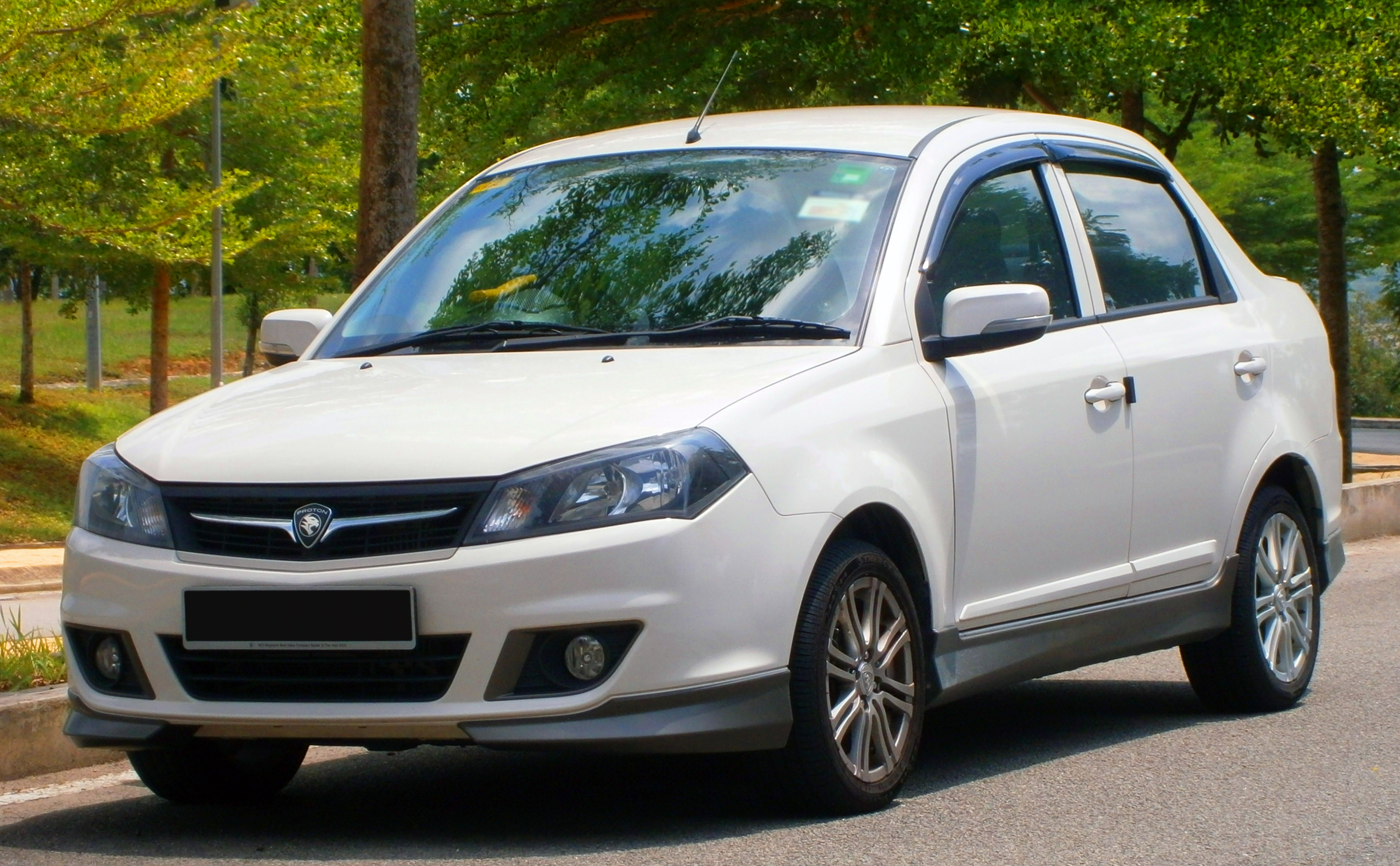

Overview
- Production: July 2011 – September 2016

Powertrain
- Engine: 1.3L CamPro IAFM+ DOHC I4; 1.6L CamPro IAFM+ DOHC I4
- Transmission: 5-speed manual CVT

Dimensions
- Wheelbase: 2,465 mm (97.0 in)
- Length: 4,278 mm (168.4 in)
- Width: 1,680 mm (66.1 in)
- Height: 1,520 mm (59.8 in)
- Curb weight: 1,017 kg (2,242.1 lb) – 1,080 kg (2,381.0 lb)

Eight months after the launch of the Saga FL, Proton added to its line-up the Saga FLX, codenamed P2-11C. The additional 'X' stands for extra. As with the previous iteration, the FLX is available in Standard and Executive trim lines. Both versions are equipped with the updated CamPro IAFM+ engine which can mated to a choice of either manual or CVT drivetrains. The Belgian-made Punch Powertrain CVT provides smooth, shiftless acceleration in addition to better fuel economy compared to the older 4-speed automatic. Furthermore, the old 5-speed Aichi Kikai manual transmission was replaced with a newer 5-speed Getrag manual. Safety wise, the Saga FLX now comes with dual airbags and anti-lock braking system (ABS) with electronic brakeforce distribution (EBD). However, these features are only available in the more expensive Executive variant. The handling has been vastly improved with a new suspension setup which features stiffer springs, a thicker front anti-roll bar and revised shocks which strike a balance between ride comfort and handling performance. A new colour option, Elegant Brown was made available and the Saga FLX is competitively priced between RM38,370 and RM45,220. The exterior of the Saga FLX is identical to the Saga FL.

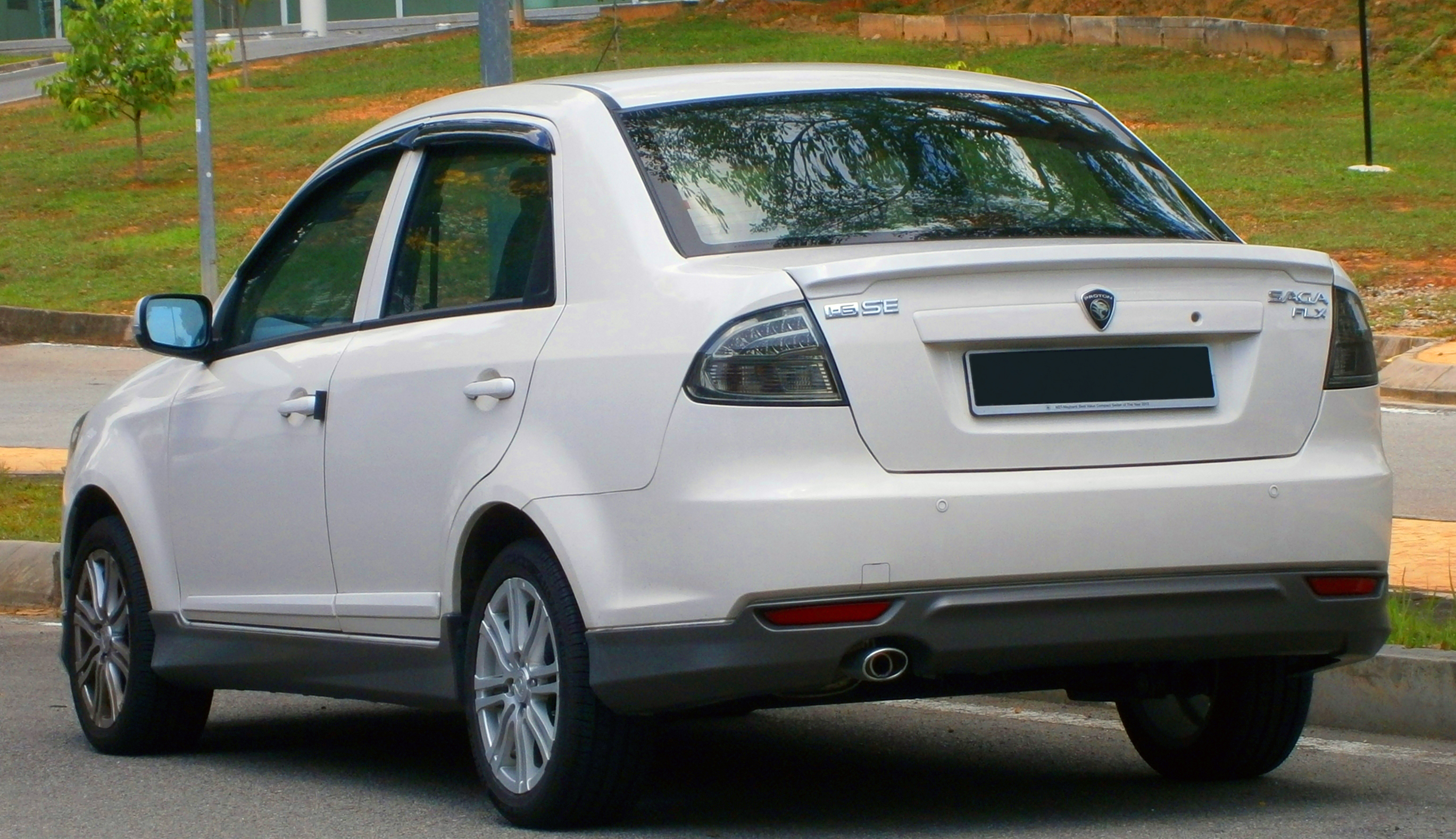
Proton Saga FLX SE.

Proton participated in the RAC Future Car Challenge on 6 November 2011 with plug-in electric versions of the Saga, Exora and Persona, in which the company claimed 2 awards despite their shortcomings.

The Proton Saga FLX SE was launched on 30 November 2011. It is powered by a 108 hp CamPro IAFM+ 1.6 litre engine, paired to a CVT. Driver and passenger airbags as well as ABS with EBD come standard. A new body kit, smoked rear lamps and 15-inch alloy wheels give the FLX SE a sportier, more aggressive look. Leather upholstery and red stitching is present on the interior. It is only available in two colours, Solid White and Fire Red, and tentatively priced at RM49,899, around RM6,500 less than its primary competitor, the Perodua MyVi SE 1.5 automatic.

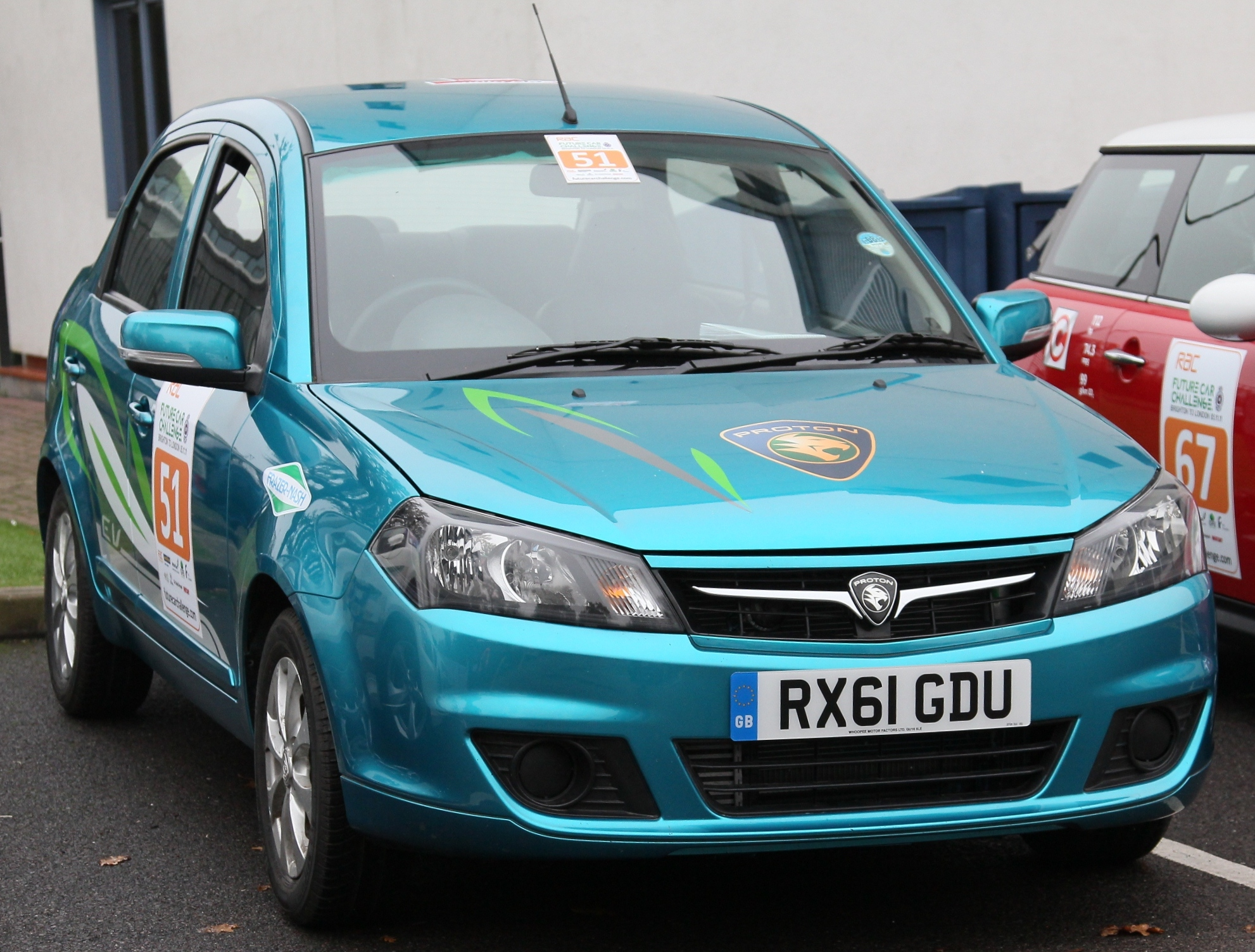
The Proton Saga EV during the RAC Future Car Challenge 2011, U.K..

The Saga FLX entered the Australian market in June 2012, where it was renamed the S16 FLX. It replaces the old S16 in Proton Australia's fleet. The S16 FLX comes in two variants, the GX and GXR, each with manual and CVT drivetrain options respectively. Dual airbags, ABS and EBD and ESC are standard on all S16 FLX variants, and a new colour, Solid Red was introduced. ESC was never made available in Malaysia delivered Saga FLX's. It is priced between AUD$13,990 and AUD$16,990.

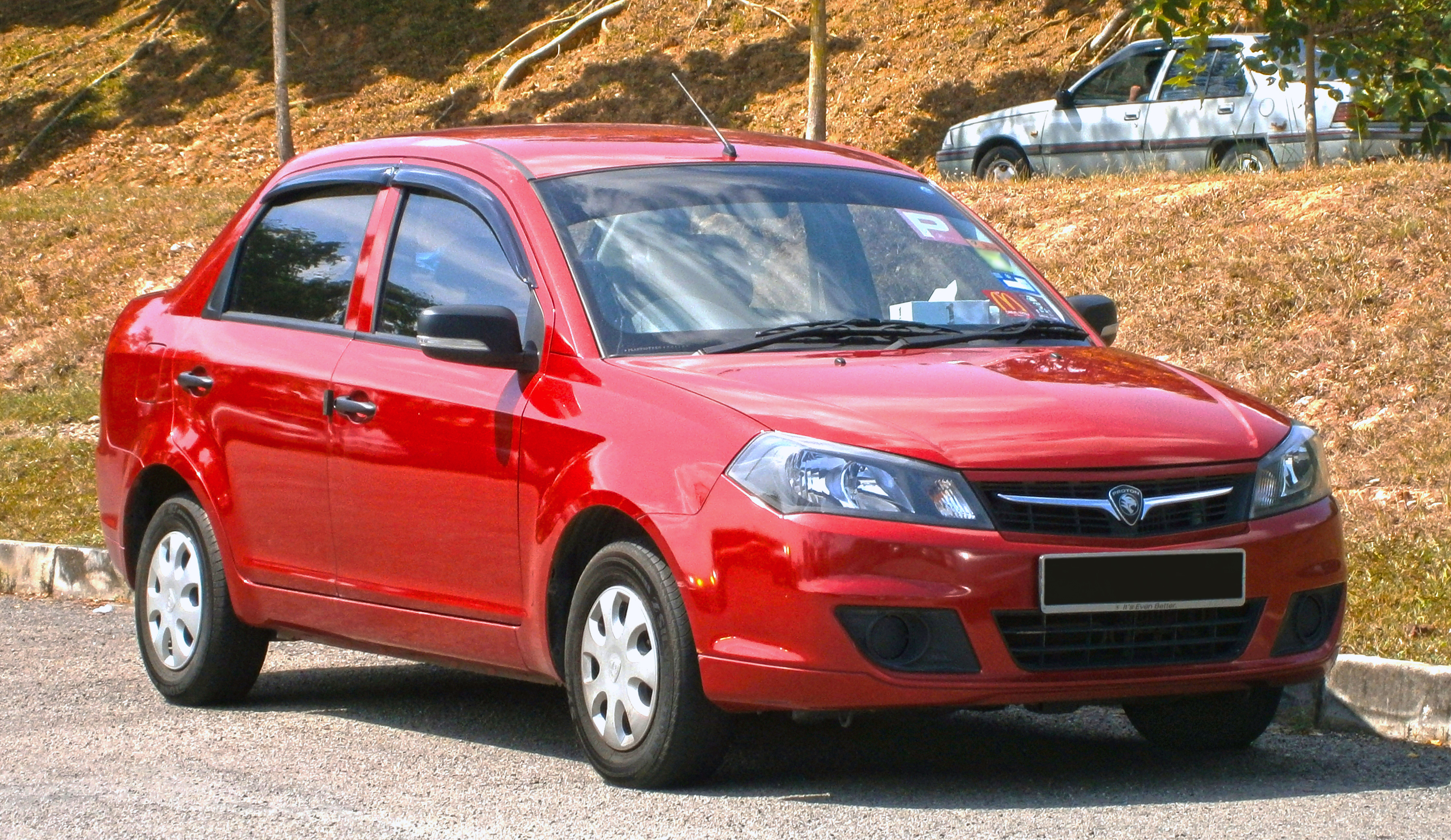
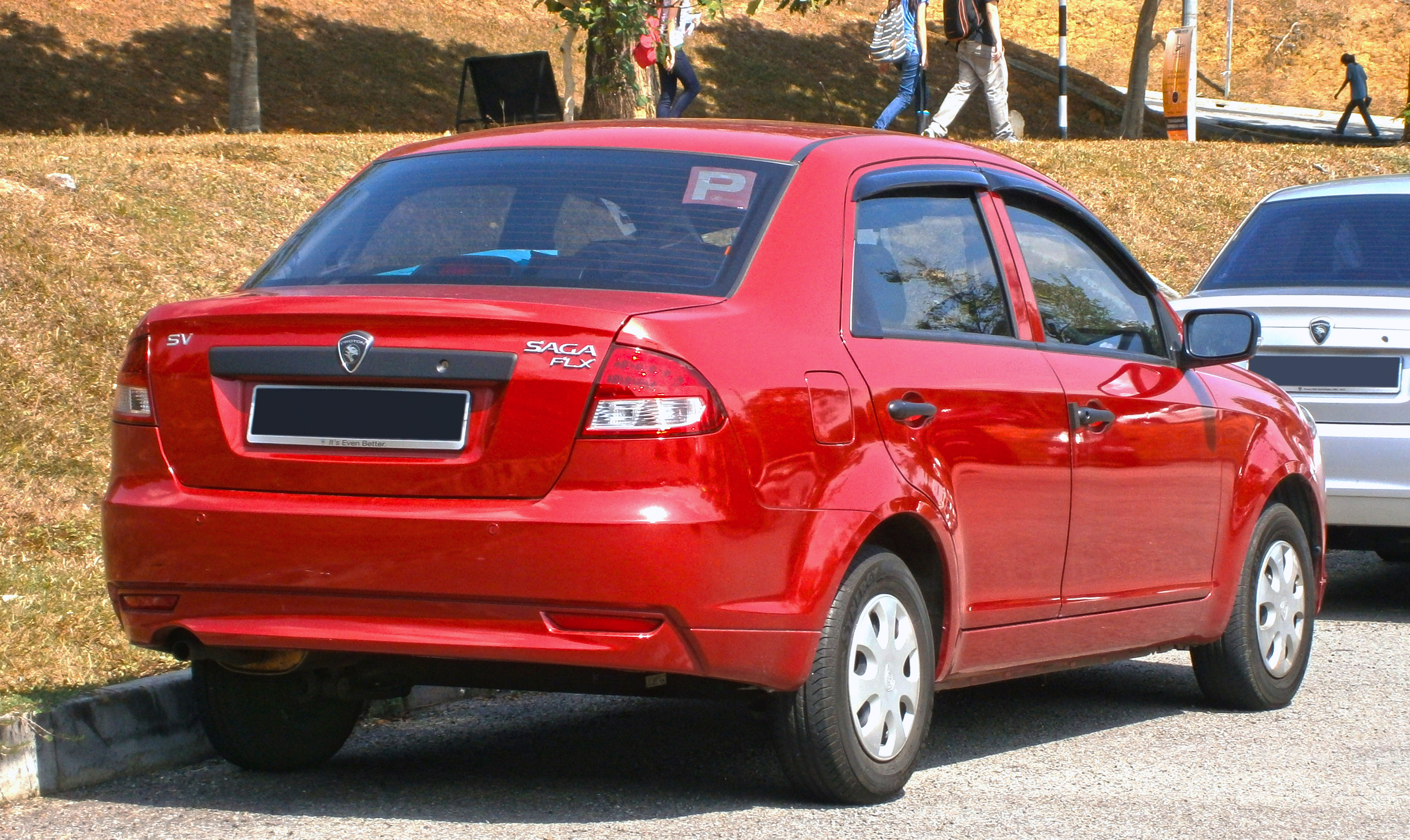
2013–2015 Proton Saga SV.

On 15 June 2013, Proton introduced a new sub-variant of the Saga FLX, called the Saga SV. SV is an acronym for Super Value, with prices starting from just RM33,438 for the manual transmission variant, making it over RM8,000 less than its closest rival, the Perodua Myvi 1.3 SX and around RM5,000 cheaper than the Saga FLX Standard 1.3. Despite the reduction in price, the Saga SV offers improved safety standards with dual airbags and a reinforced frame with only minimal exterior changes when compared to the Saga FLX Standard.

On 14 August 2015, Proton unveiled the Saga Plus, the latest variant in the Saga FLX family. The Saga Plus replaces the Saga SV and incorporates cosmetic upgrades from the more upmarket Saga Executive and Saga SE variants. The cosmetic enhancements include the body-coloured bodykit, bootlid spoiler and 14-inch six-spoke alloy wheels from the Saga Executive, as well as a painted rear bootlid garnish and a 'Plus' badge on the upper left side of the boot. However, the Saga Plus lacks front fog lights, painted door handles, Bluetooth connectivity, powered mirrors and steering wheel controls, all of which were previously offered on the Saga Executive. The Saga Plus is fitted with two front airbags and three-point seat belts on all five seats, but it lacks ABS and EBD. There are no significant mechanical changes; the 1.3 litre CamPro IAFM+ four-cylinder engine with 94 hp at 5,750 rpm and 120 Nm of torque, paired to either the 5-speed Getrag manual or the Punch CVT gearboxes carry on unchanged from the Saga SV. The Saga Plus is produced in five colours, namely Tranquility Black, Fire Red, Genetic Silver, Solid White and Elegant Brown. Despite the added cosmetic upgrades, prices for the Saga Plus remain unchanged from the Saga SV, ranging from RM33,242 for the manual with solid paint to RM36,577 for the CVT with metallic paint, all of which are on-the-road prices with insurance. A three-year or 100,000 km warranty is also offered.

The second generation Saga FLX is also sold in Egypt in a sole executive variant with either manual or CVT transmission. The specifications mirror those of the Malaysian market but to note that the Saga sold in Egypt is left-hand drive. A batch of Proton cars including the Saga departed Malaysia in September 2018 and arrived in Egypt in October 2018. It is unknown when the Egyptian market Saga's were assembled.

Based on the outgoing Saga FLX platform, the third generation Proton Saga was officially launched on 28 September 2016 at Setia City Convention Centre in Shah Alam, Malaysia.

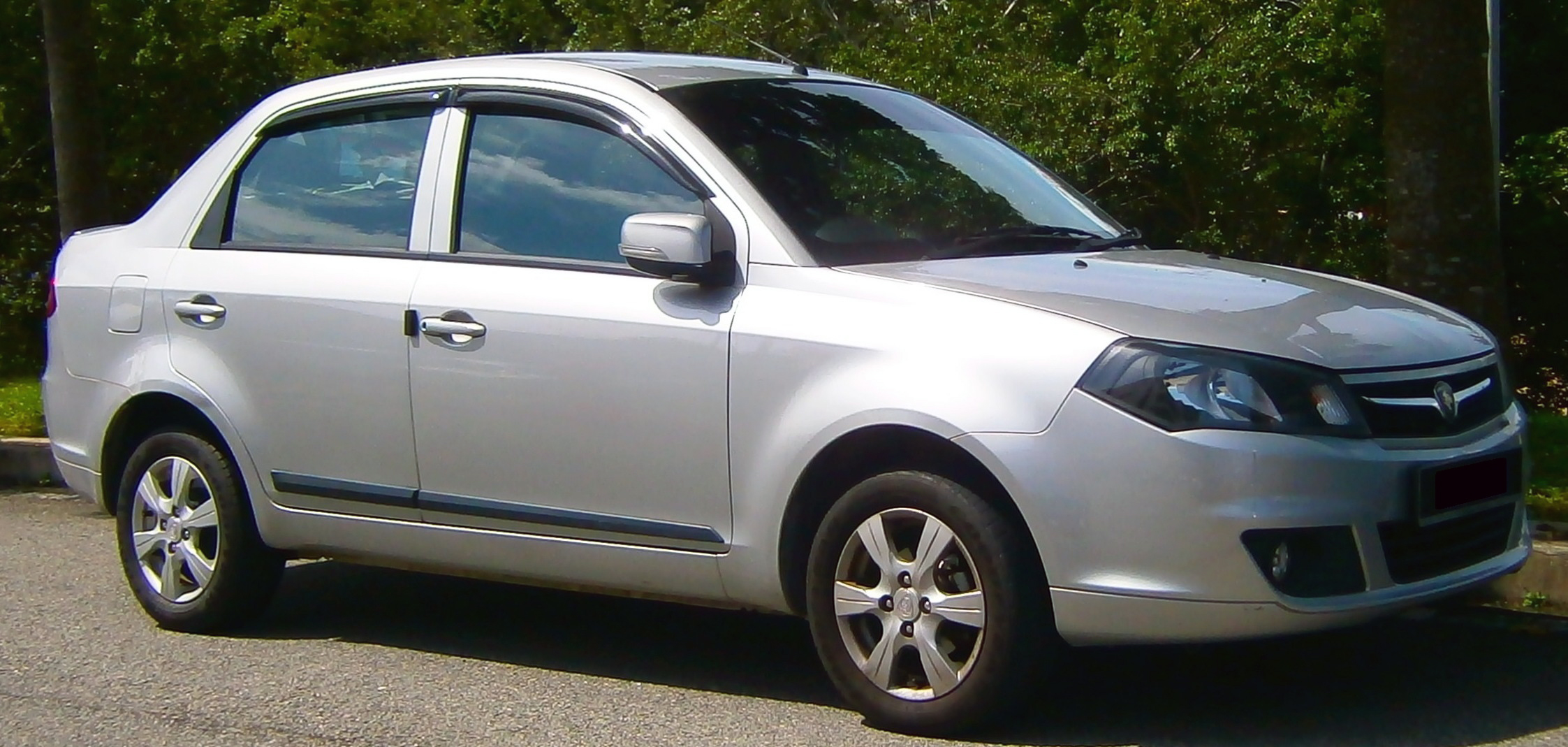
2013 Proton Saga FLX Executive Front (Cyberjaya, Malaysia)

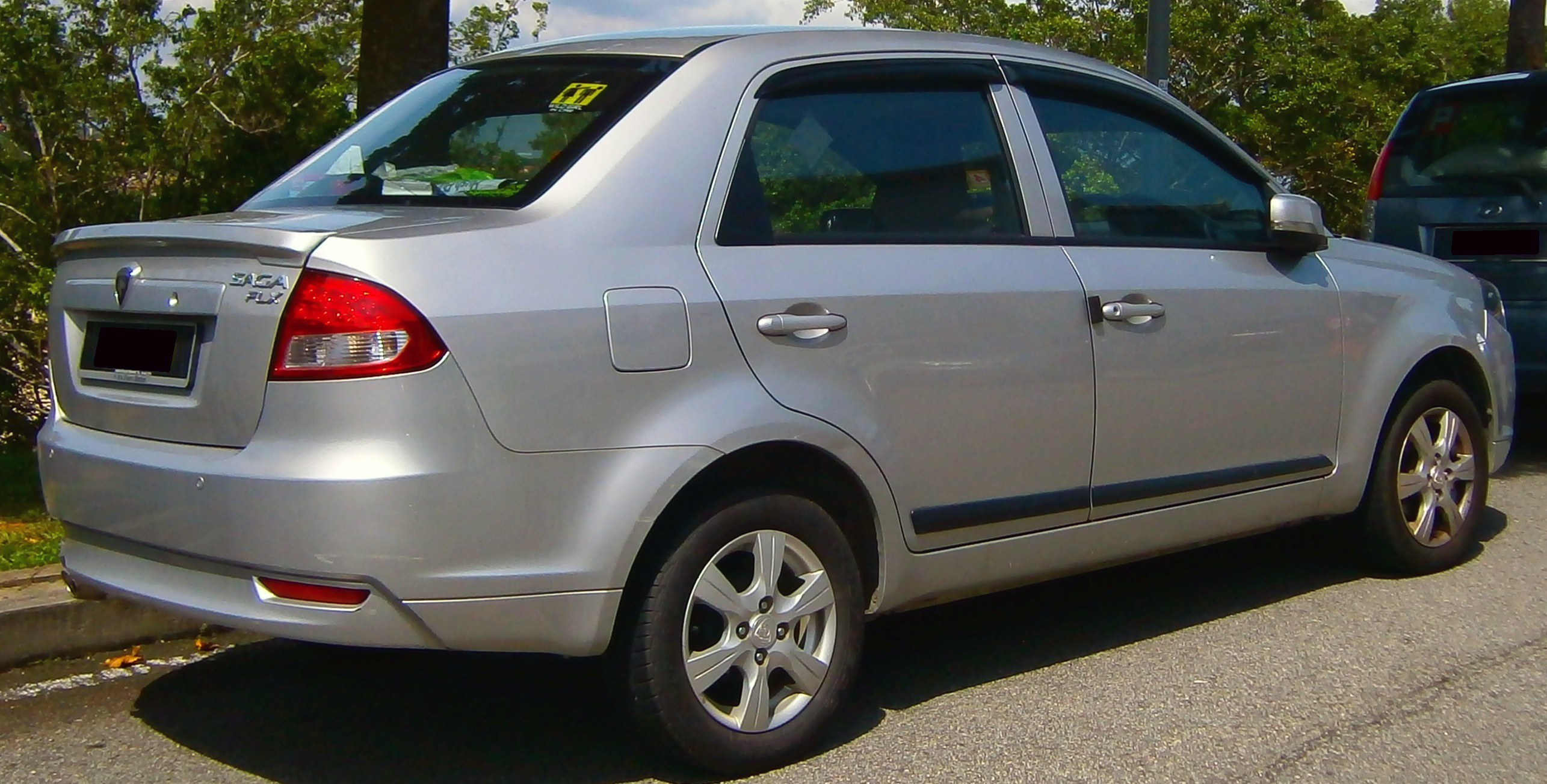
2013 Proton Saga FLX Executive Rear (Cyberjaya, Malaysia)

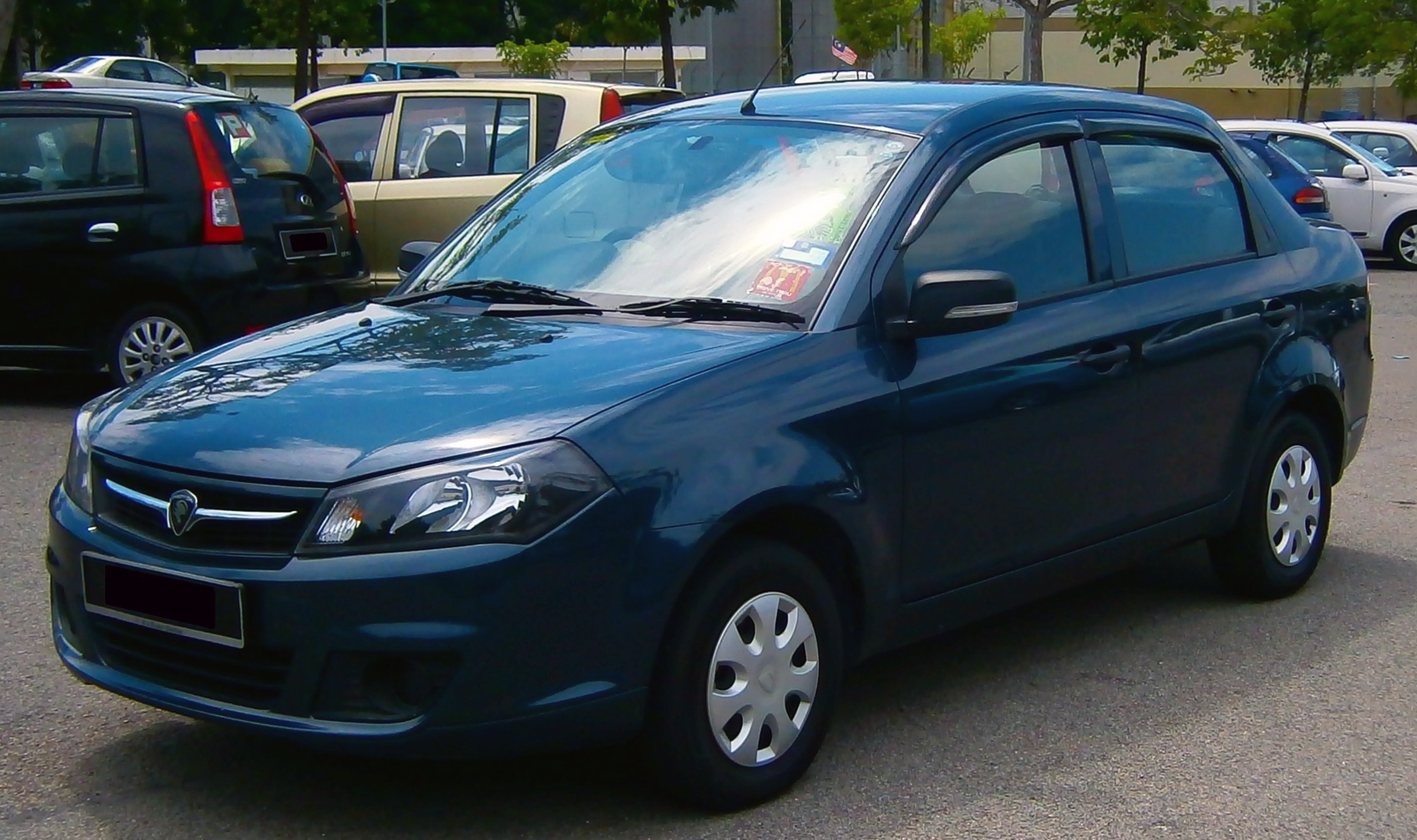
2013 Proton Saga FLX Standard Front (Cyberjaya, Malaysia)

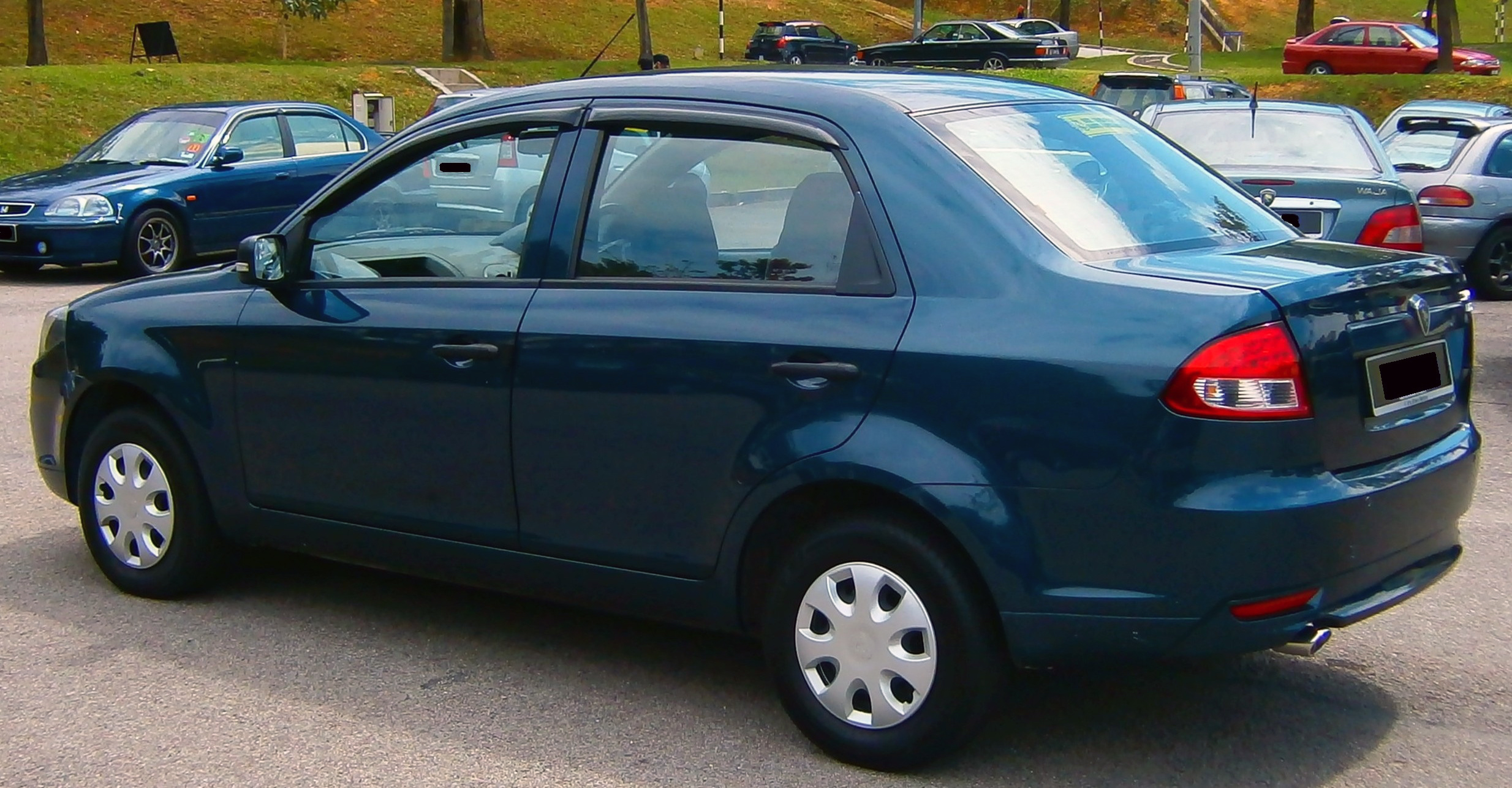
2013 Proton Saga FLX Standard Rear (Cyberjaya, Malaysia)

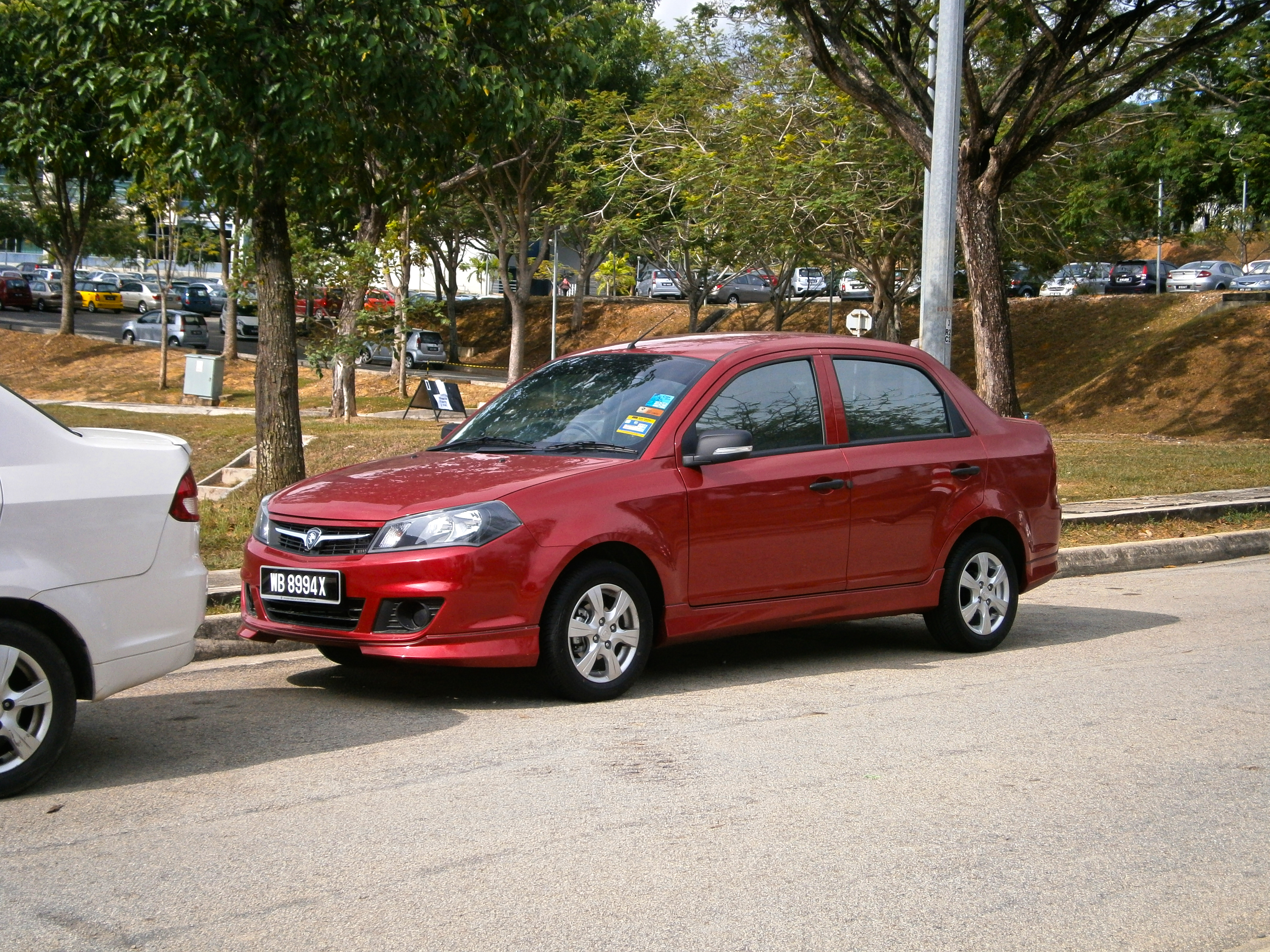
2015 Proton Saga FLX Plus Front (Cyberjaya, Malaysia)

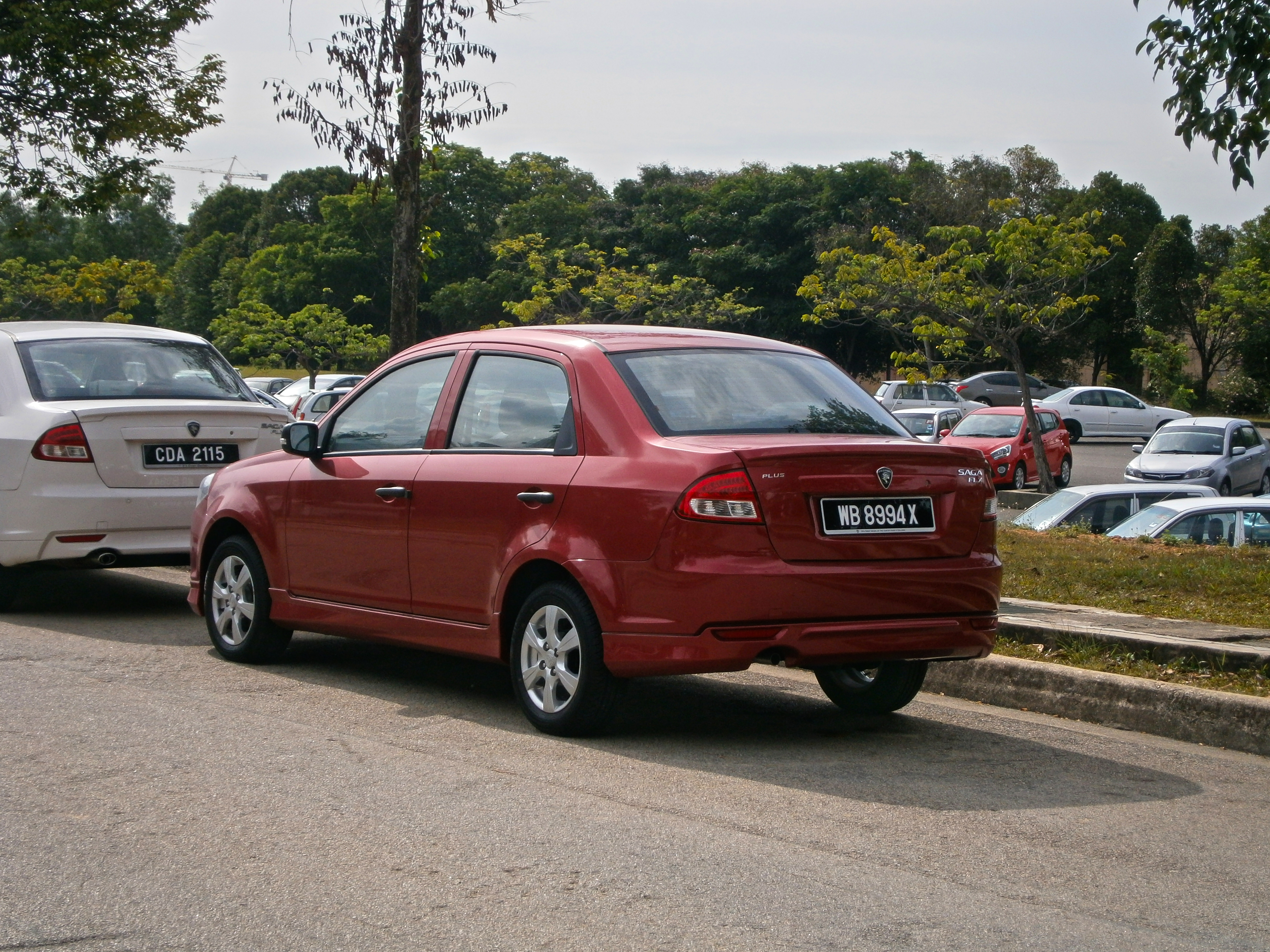
2015 Proton Saga FLX Plus Rear (Cyberjaya, Malaysia)

== Safety ==
ANCAP test results* Proton S16 (2010)
Test	Score
Overall	3 /5 stars
Frontal offset	9.29/16
Side impact	10.67/16
Pole	Not Assessed
Seat belt reminders	0/3
Whiplash protection	Not Assessed
Pedestrian protection	Marginal
Electronic stability control	Not Available

ASEAN NCAP test results Proton FLX (2012)
Test	Points	Stars
Adult occupant:	4.30	1 /5 stars
Child occupant:	49%	0 /5 stars
Safety assist:	NA	

ASEAN NCAP test results Proton FLX+ (2013)
Test	Points	Stars
Adult occupant:	10.23	3 /5 stars
Child occupant:	58%	0 /5 stars
Safety assist:	NA	

== Specifications ==
Manufacturer's claims
Powertrain and performance
Engine	CamPro IAFM, 4-cylinder, DOHC 16V
Maximum speed (km/h)	160 km/h (99 mph) manual / 155 km/h (96 mph) automatic
Acceleration 0–100 km/h (sec)	13.0 seconds manual / 14.5 seconds automatic
Maximum power hp(kW)/rpm	94 hp (70 kW) / 6,000 rpm
Maximum torque (Nm/rpm)	120 N⋅m (89 lb⋅ft) / 4,000 rpm
Full tank capacity (litres)	40
Tyres and rims	175 / 70 R13 – steel or 185 / 60 R14 – alloy or 195 / 50 / 15 - alloy
Chassis
Power Steering	Hydraulic power steering
Suspension (front/rear)	MacPherson strut / torsion beam
Brake (front/rear)	Ventilated disc / drum

== Awards ==
- 2008 Best Compact / People's car of the year – Asian Auto-VCA Auto Industry Awards
- 2008 Entry Level Category Winner – NST / Maybank COTY Awards 2008
- 2009 Best Model of the Year (Malaysia) – Frost & Sullivan Asia Pacific 2009 Automotive Awards
- 2010 Best Passenger Car Model of the Year – Frost & Sullivan Malaysia Excellence Award 2010
- 2011 Best People's Car and Best Value for Money Family Car Awards – Asian Auto – Auto Industry Awards 2011
- 2012 Special Mention Award – Best Value Compact Sedan of the Year – NST / Maybank COTY Awards 2012
