= Taxis of Malaysia =

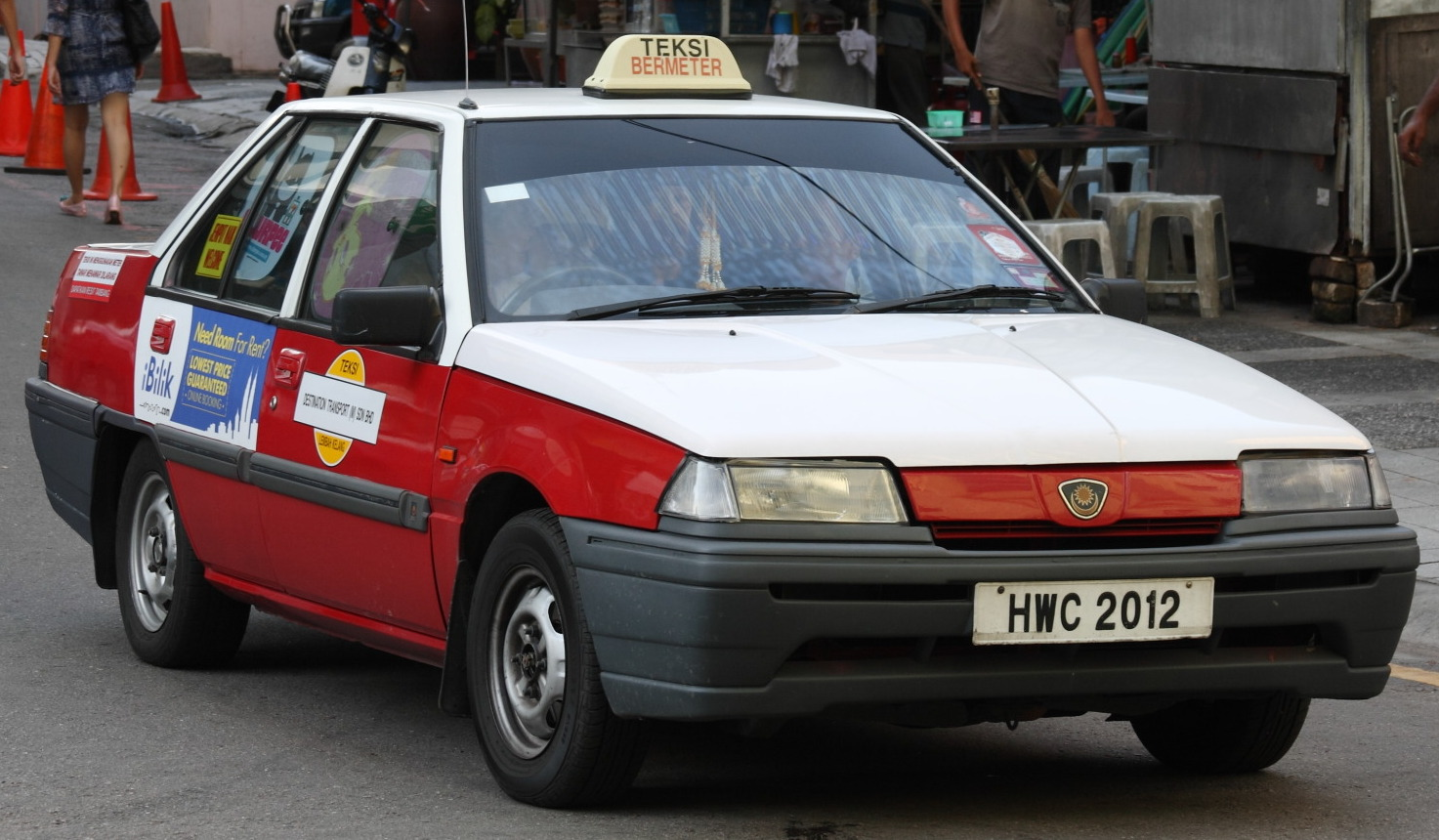
Since the 1990s, the saloon variant of the Proton Saga Iswara dominated as the preferable car model for taxicabs in Malaysia.

In Malaysia, taxicabs are also referred to as teksi. There are several taxi operators running within Malaysia. Most taxicabs use their preferred car of choice, the Proton Saga Iswara saloon since the 1990s, and a distinct fleet of cabs are the newer generation of Proton Saga since the 2010s.

Before the start of local car production, the Mercedes-Benz 200, Mazda 323/Ford Laser, Toyota Mark II X80 series and the Opel Kadett were used. Most were scrapped and replaced by Protons, but there are still a large number running the roads. Those old models have a "Kereta Sewa" sign on top and use old taxi registration plates.

Although most taxicabs run on diesel, a handful of taxicabs run on CNG.

There are a number of small taxicab companies and some private individual ones. Cabs are generally in red and white. Larger and reliable taxi companies are required to display they owned colors i.e. Sunlight Radio Cab, Innovasi Timur Orange Taxi Cab and Public Cab.

== Gallery ==
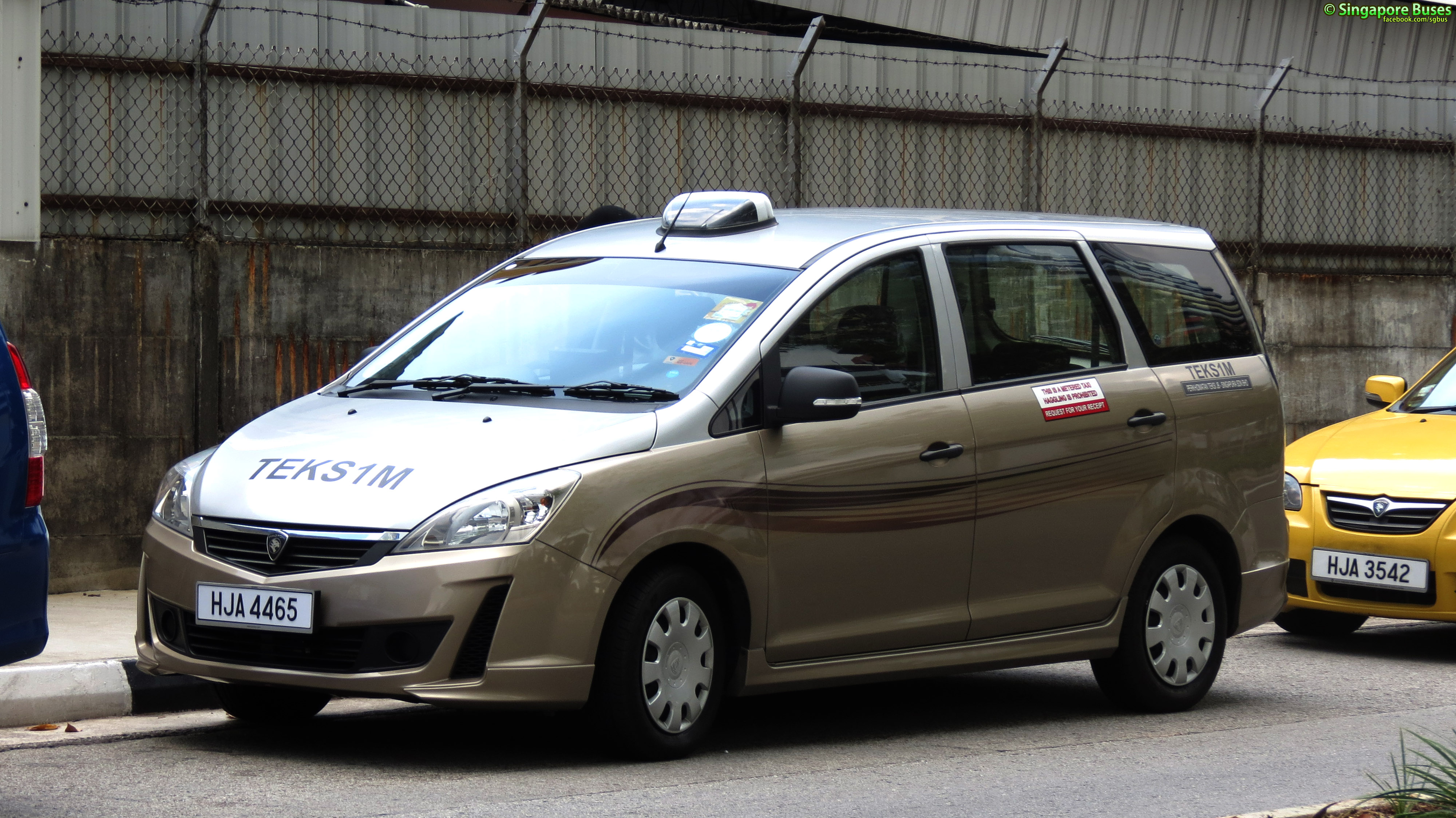
Budget taxi in Johor Bahru

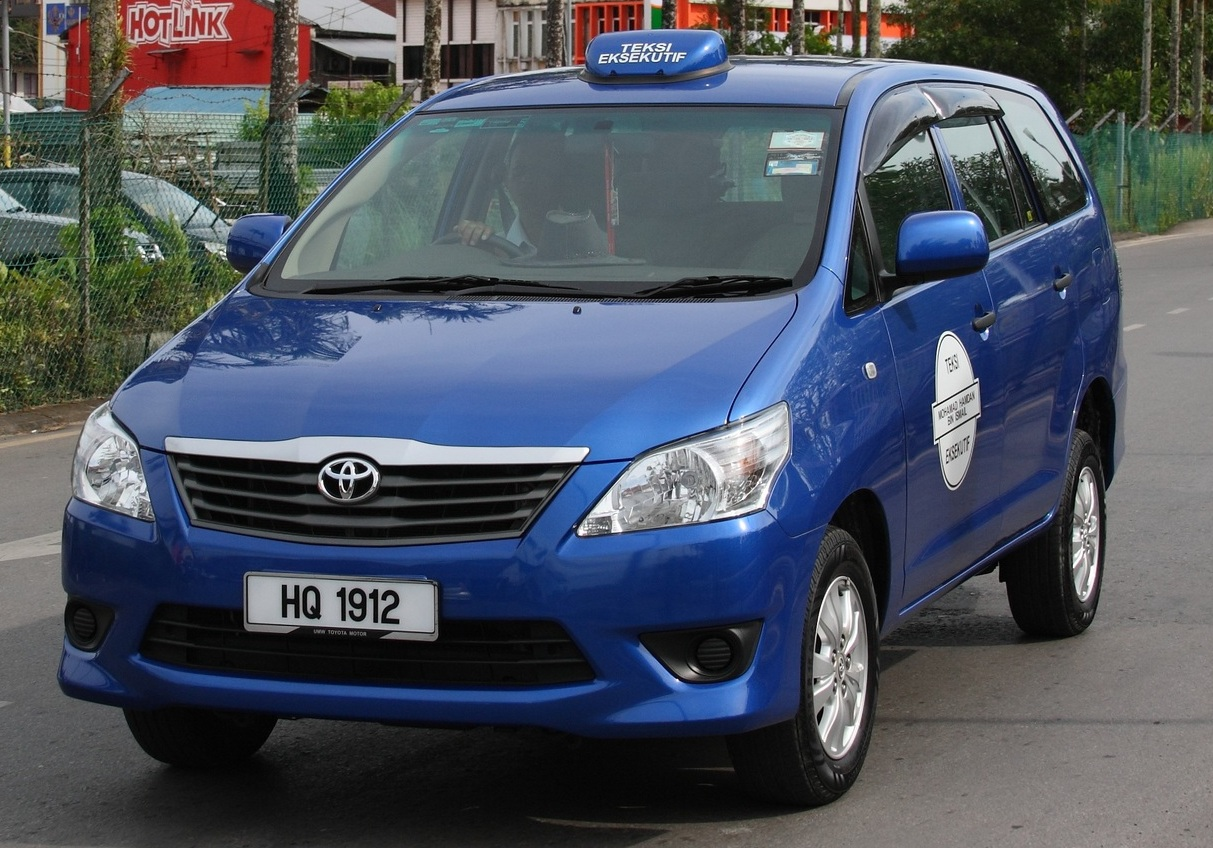
Executive taxi in Kuching

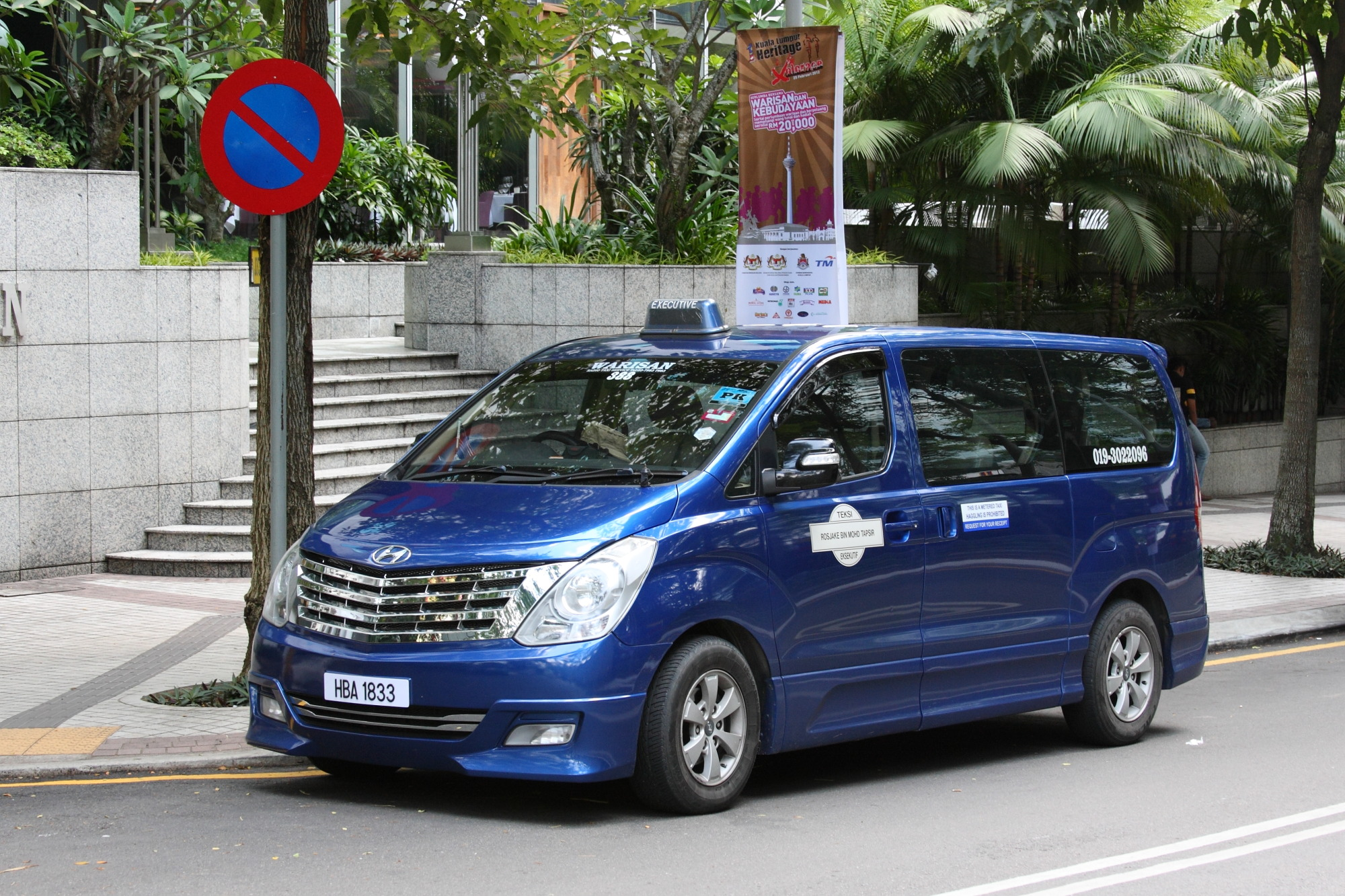
Executive taxi in Kuala Lumpur

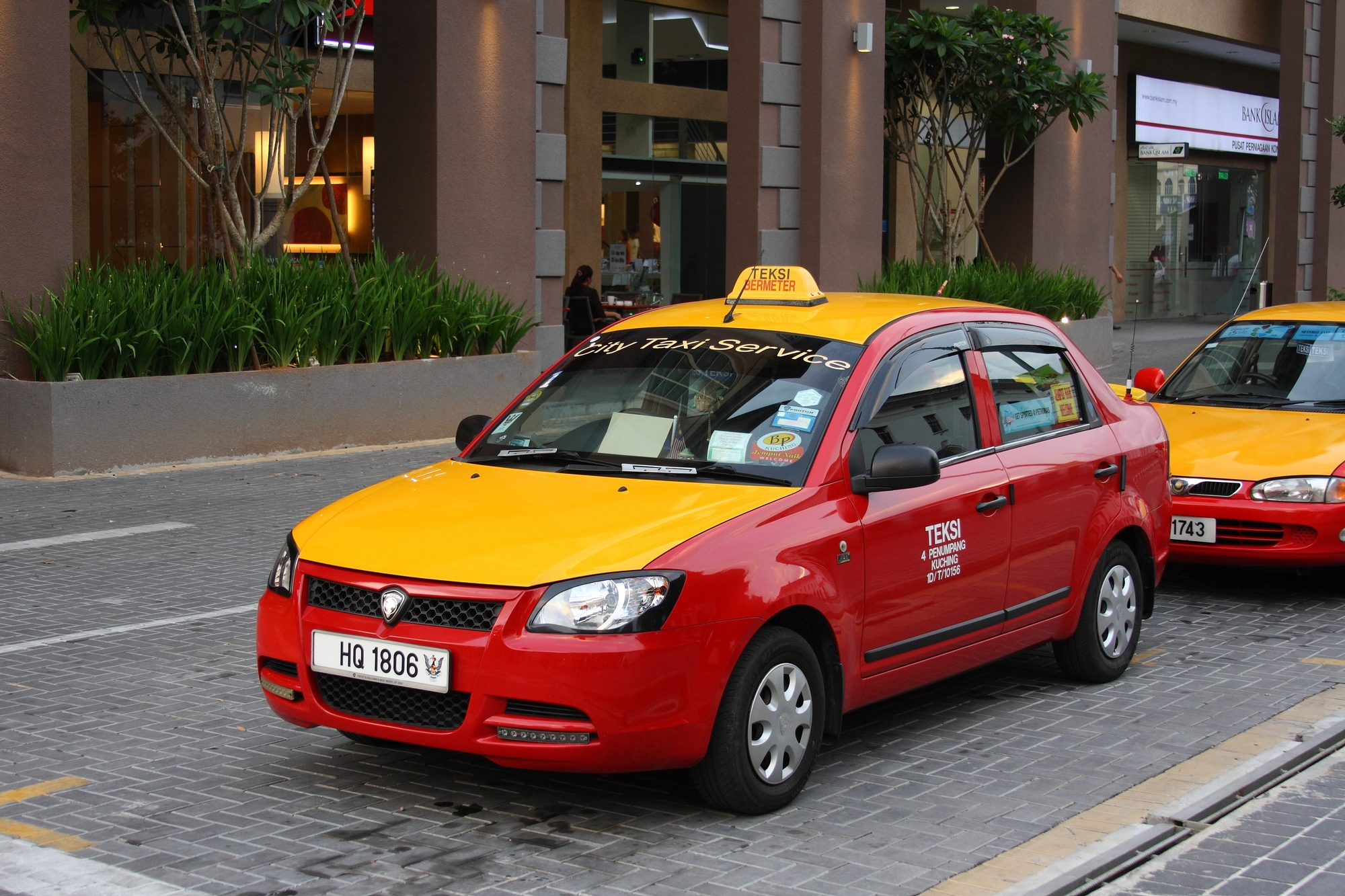
Budget taxi in Kuching

== Reputation ==
The reputation of Malaysia's taxi service has been marred by the poor conduct of local taxi drivers, who have been known, among others, refusing usage of taximeters, overcharging and force picking which destinations the customers will travel to, while also driving poorly maintained vehicles. Larger metered taxi companies i.e. Sunlight Radio Cab, RB Premier Taxi Sdn. Bhd., Uptownace (M) Sdn. Bhd., Laluan Emas Sdn. Bhd,. Insan Lemak Sdn. Bhd. and Innovasi Timur Orange Taxi Cab are more likely to charge passengers using meter; although they are still owned and managed by individual taxi drivers. Newer companies such as Swift Limousine & Cab owns and controls their vehicles with ensures all drivers have rigorous background checks. An alternative option is to use secure taxi booking apps like Grab or TaxiMonger. Drivers are certified safe and all will use taxi-meters. The apps also allow customers to contact the assigned driver directly and track their whereabouts on a real time map. In a June 2008 survey conducted by Malaysian expatriate magazine The Expat on an estimated 200 foreigners from 30 countries, Malaysia's taxis were found to rank the lowest among the 23 countries in terms of quality, courtesy, availability and expertise. The behavior of taxi drivers has tarnished the image of Malaysia, particularly among foreign tourists, to the point some have begun resorting to paying for upscale taxis that are more expensive but operate with better service.
