= Automotive industry in Malaysia =

The automotive industry in Malaysia consists of 27 vehicle producers and over 640 component manufacturers. The Malaysian automotive industry is the third largest in Southeast Asia, and the 23rd largest in the world, with an annual production output of over 500,000 vehicles. The automotive industry contributes 4% or RM 40 billion to Malaysia's GDP, and employs a workforce of over 700,000 throughout a nationwide ecosystem.

The automotive industry in Malaysia traces its origins back to the British colonial era. Ford Malaya became the first automobile assembly plant in Southeast Asia upon its establishment in Singapore in 1926. The automotive industry in post-independence Malaysia was established in 1967 to spur national industrialisation. The government offered initiatives to encourage the local assembly of vehicles and manufacturing of automobile components. In 1983, the government became directly involved in the automotive industry through the establishment of national car company Proton, followed by Perodua in 1993. Since the 2000s, the government had sought to liberalise the domestic automotive industry through free-trade agreements, privatisation and harmonisation of UN regulations.

The Malaysian automotive industry is Southeast Asia's sole pioneer of indigenous car companies, namely Proton and Perodua. In 2002, Proton helped Malaysia become the 11th country in the world with the capability to fully design, engineer and manufacture cars from the ground up. The Malaysian automotive industry also hosts several domestic-foreign joint venture companies, which assemble a large variety of vehicles from imported complete knock down (CKD) kits.

The automotive industry in Malaysia primarily serves domestic demand, and only several thousand complete built up (CBU) vehicles are exported annually. Exports of Malaysian made parts and components have nonetheless grown significantly in the last decade, contributing over RM 11 billion to Malaysia's GDP in 2016.

== History ==
=== 1780s–1950s ===
==== Malaysia during the British colonial era ====
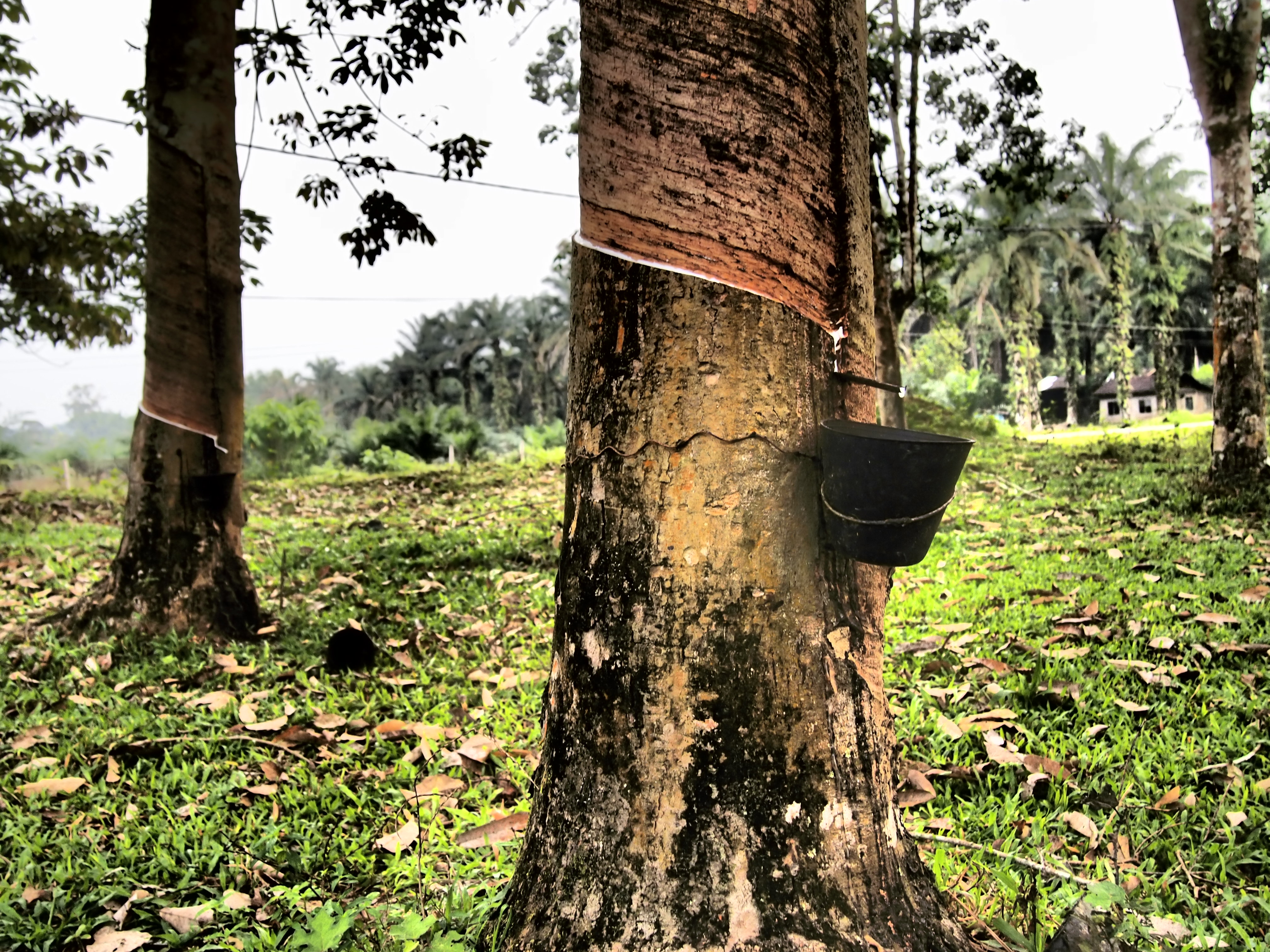
Rubber plantation

Malaysia had been a British colony prior to its independence in the mid-19th century. West Malaysia was originally known as Malaya, and was governed separately from the would-be East Malaysian states of North Borneo and Sarawak. British colonisation of Malaya began in the late 18th century, and would encompass all of Malaya by the early 20th century. British rule in Malaya was divided between the Straits Settlements (which included Singapore), the Federated Malay States and the Unfederated Malay States.

During the colonial era, the Malayan economy was largely dependent on natural rubber and tin commodity exports. Industrialisation in British Malaya was not emphasised due to the profitability and high demand for rubber and tin. Malaya was strategically located along major ocean trade routes originating from East Asia and the Indian Ocean. Trade and commerce made British Malaya the most prosperous of all the European colonies in Southeast Asia.

The boom of rubber and tin exports had funded the growth of the Malayan road network over the decades. In 1911, there were over 4,000 miles of road in the Straits Settlements and the Federated Malay States. By 1923, it was possible to drive from Singapore to Bangkok on the Malayan north-south highway. Car ownership in Malaya had also increased ten-fold between 1910 and 1925.

==== Western cars dominate ====
Imports of automobiles into British Malaya by country of origin, 1925–1929
Country	1925	1926	1927	1928	1929	Total
United States	5,570	4,705	2,100	2,233	2,708	17,316
United Kingdom	2,064	2,621	2,495	1,759	2,207	11,146
Canada	N/A	2,618	2,411	1,183	1,412	7,624
Italy	527	667	253	316	831	2,594
France	200	453	491	100	138	1,382
Others	635	199	303	139	113	1,389
Total	8,996	11,263	8,053	5,730	7,409	41,451

The earliest automobiles arrived in Malaya during the 1890s and 1900s. Western car companies from America, the British Empire and Continental Europe had established a strong foothold in Malaya by the 1910s. The automobile market in colonial Malaya was relatively small, and catered mainly to British expatriates and wealthy ethnic Chinese entrepreneurs in major cities such as Singapore, Penang, Kuala Lumpur and Ipoh.

In the early 20th century, American car companies collectively held the largest share of the Malayan car market. The British administration made attempts to restrict the advancement of American cars in Malaya, as a means of protecting British business interests. American cars were subject to tariffs and periodical bans, while cars from Britain were allowed to be sold duty-free in Malaya. However, American cars were often cheaper despite the costly taxes, and some companies found ways to circumvent the tax restrictions altogether.

==== The reign of Ford Malaya ====
The automobile industry in British Malaya was pioneered by the Ford Motor Company. Ford sought to capitalise on existing Anglo-American ties to expand globally, and Malaya was recognised for its strategic potential as a regional export base. Ford's entry into Malaya was spearheaded by Ford Canada, an affiliate of Ford USA. Ford Canada was set up in 1904 to capitalise on its British colony status, which allowed it to export automobiles duty-free to the various Empire colonies. Ford Canada appointed Dodge & Seymour to handle sales in Asia, and the first Ford models were shipped into Malaya in 1909. Malayan Ford sales grew in the following years, and Ford Canada decided to take direct control of its Malayan operations in 1926.

In November 1926, the Ford Motor Company of Malaya Ltd. (Ford Malaya) was incorporated in Singapore, and the company set up a small garage in a two-storey shop house on Anson Road. The garage carried out wheel-fitting and touching up for Model T units between 1926 and 1929. In January 1930, Ford Malaya moved operations to a warehouse in Prince Edward Road, where they carried out more sophisticated semi-knock down (SKD) assembly. The new plant assembled SKD kits which were imported from Ford Canada and Ford England. Ford's market share in British Malaya peaked at 80% in 1939.

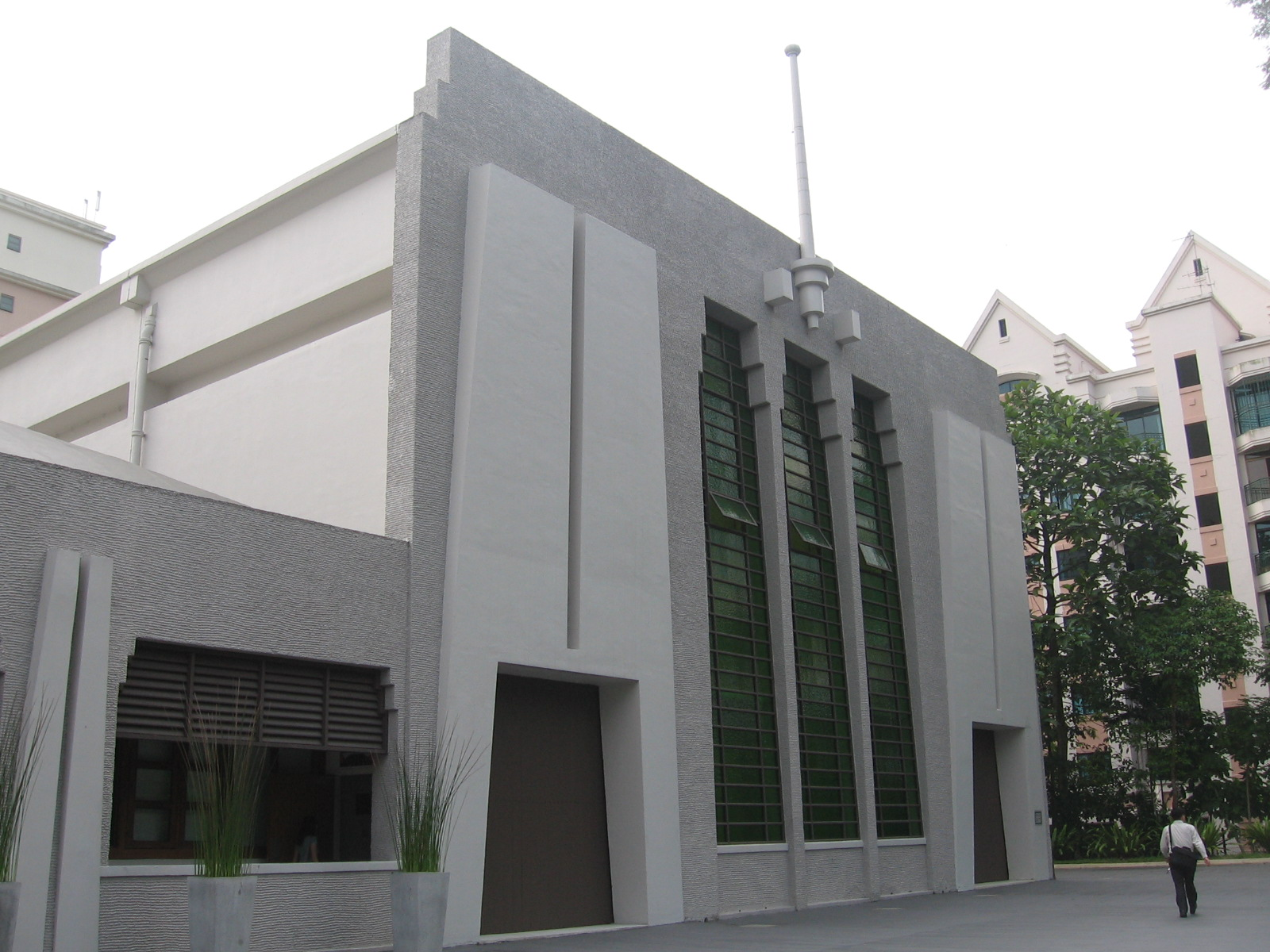
The former Ford Malaya plant in modern day Singapore

In April 1941, Ford Malaya moved operations to their all-new assembly plant in Bukit Timah, Singapore. The 1941 Ford Malaya factory became the first fully-fledged automobile assembly plant in Southeast Asia. Complete-knock down (CKD) body assembly commenced in October 1941. However, World War II broke out in Malaya just two months later, and Singapore fell to the invading Japanese Army in February 1942. The Ford Malaya plant became the venue where British General Percival formally surrendered to General Yamashita of Japan. During the occupation of Singapore, the Japanese used the Ford plant to assemble Nissan and Toyota trucks for the military. Following Japan's surrender in 1945, the British army reacquired the plant and returned it to Ford Malaya in 1946, and production recommenced in April 1947.

Between 1926 and 1965, Ford Malaya stood as the sole automobile assembler in Singapore. Throughout its history, Ford Malaya would export its produce to British Malaya (later West Malaysia), British Borneo (later East Malaysia and Brunei), Siam (later Thailand), the Dutch East Indies (later Indonesia), Burma, India and Pakistan. Ford Malaya had imported SKD and CKD kits from the United States, Canada, Britain, Germany and Australia respectively. Ford Malaya produced over 150,000 automobiles over the decades, and finally closed down in 1980. The government of Singapore would later gazette the old Ford factory as a national monument in February 2006.

==== Attempts by General Motors ====
In the mid-1920s, General Motors (GM) of America had also expressed intentions to establish a regional hub in British Malaya. In mid-1926, GM approached the British administration in Singapore and requested permission to build an assembly plant in the affluent Tanjong Katong area. However, the local British authorities denied GM's application on grounds that it would 'spoil the amenities of the Katong residential area'. In light of the situation, GM decided to set up their regional assembly plant in the Dutch East Indies instead.

In late 1926, a General Motors delegation approached the Dutch administration in Java. GM was granted permission to set up an assembly plant near Batavia, and in February 1927, N.V. General Motors Java Handel Maatschappij (GM Java) was established. The all-new GM Java plant, the colony's first automobile assembly plant, commenced production in May 1927. GM Java exported its produce throughout the Dutch East Indies, British Malaya, French Indochina and Siam.

On the onset of World War II, the Dutch East Indies fell to the invading Japanese Army in March 1942. The GM Java plant was taken over by Toyota, and was used to assemble trucks for the military. After the Japanese surrender in 1945, the Dutch failed to regain control of their colony, and the Indonesian War of Independence broke out and dragged on for a further four years.

In July 1947, General Motors revived plans for an assembly plant in Singapore. The new plant would assemble cars and trucks from components imported from GM's subsidiaries in Canada and Britain. Operations would begin in early 1948, and the plant would serve all of GM Java's former export markets, in addition to parts of southern China. However, in June 1948, the local British administration banned imports of American cars into Malaya and Singapore, and GM was once again forced out of Singapore. Following the 1950 Indonesian independence, GM's plant in Java was restructured, and became the Djakarta Branch of the GM Overseas Corporation. However, in April 1956, GM's shareholders liquidated the Djakarta Branch, and General Motors sold their Indonesian plant to P.N. Gaja Motors.

=== 1950s ===
==== Independence and industrialisation ====
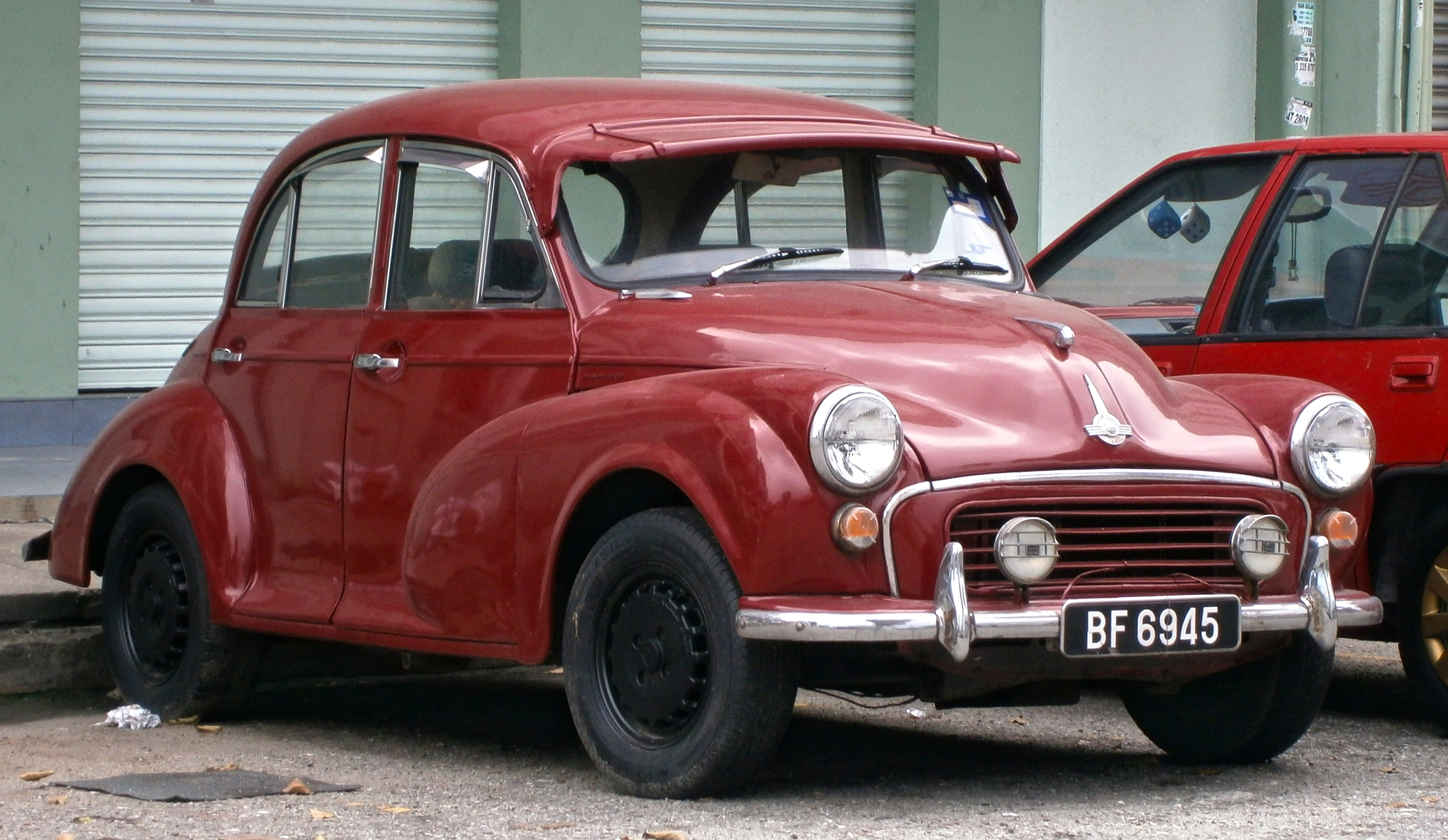
In 1956, British imports accounted for 65% of new vehicle sales in Malaya. (Morris Minor pictured)

In August 1957, Malaya gained its independence and the Federation of Malaya was formed. Singapore, Sarawak and North Borneo remained British crown colonies. In the late 1950s, the Malayan government began to emphasise industrialisation as a more dependable sector for economic stability and growth. Global tin and natural rubber demand witnessed large slumps and fluctuations throughout the early 20th century, and the mass production of synthetic rubber during World War II also had severe implications on the future sustainability of Malayan rubber exports.

The Malayan government initially pursued a policy of Import Substitution Industrialisation (ISI), in line with most developing countries of that period. ISI develops self-sufficiency through the creation of a strong domestic market, and is primarily state-driven through nationalisation, subsidisation, increased taxation and protectionist trade policies. The earliest Malaysian-made goods produced as a result of the new ISI policy included batteries, tires and paints.

=== 1960s ===
==== Formation of Malaysia ====
In September 1963, the Federation of Malaya with the Crown Colonies of Singapore, Sarawak and North Borneo merged to form Malaysia. The merger had granted the latter three states their independence. The new joint Malaysian-Singaporean governments later announced plans to establish an ISI-based national automotive industry, as per the recommendation of advisers from the Colombo Plan. The Malaysian Minister of Commerce and Industry, Lim Swee Aun, would become a key figure in the formation of Malaysia's automotive industry.

The 1964 Malaysian automotive policy aimed to accelerate national industrialisation through the local assembly of vehicles and manufacturing of automobile components. The government would issue manufacturing licenses to both foreign and local companies who were interested in setting up automobile assembly plants in any Malaysian state, including Singapore. The government would reduce imports of complete-built up (CBU) vehicles by means of quota regulations and tariffs, and locally assembled (SKD or CKD) vehicles with Malaysian manufactured components would be granted reductions in import duties, making them cheaper and more competitive as a result.

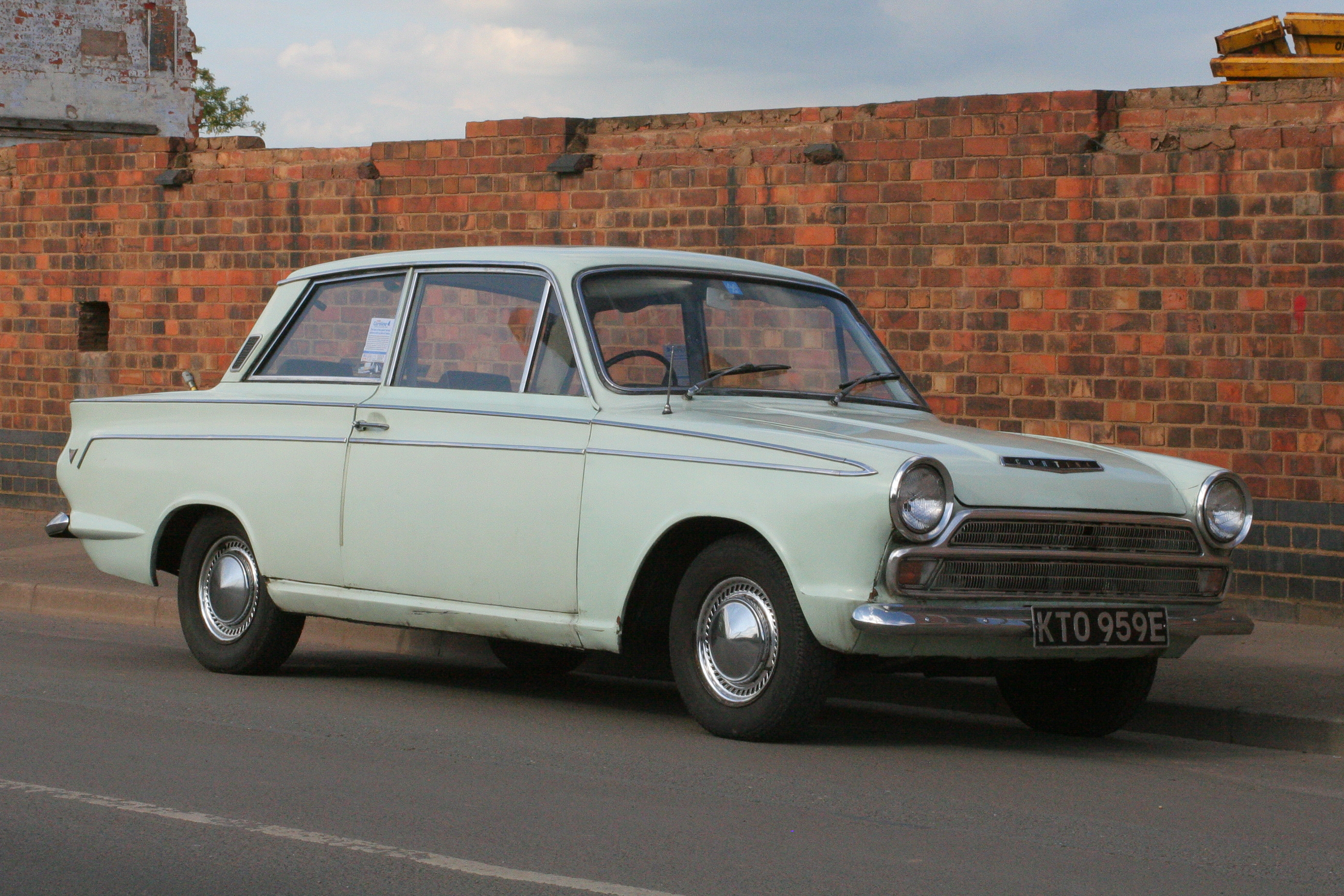
The Mk1 Ford Cortina became Malaysia's best-selling car in 1964. It was built at the Ford Malaya plant in Singapore.

By setting up local assembly plants, the government hoped to create more job opportunities and establish a market for Malaysian-made parts (local content) such as tires, paints, batteries, electrical cables, upholstery and other rubber-based goods. The government hoped that the gradual increase of local content and technology transfer over the next decade or two would eventually bring about cars that are fully 'Made in Malaysia'.

By May 1964, nineteen firms, both foreign and local, had responded to the government's call for local assembly and parts production.

==== Singapore separates from Malaysia ====
In August 1965, Singapore separated from Malaysia amid escalating political tensions, and both governments began to compete for foreign investment. In 1966, ten automobile firms banded together to establish the Motor Vehicle Assemblers Association (MVAA), and pleaded for a common automotive market between Malaysia and the newly independent Singapore. The MVAA argued that local assembly would prove economically unsustainable if both governments refused to co-operate. The combined markets of Malaysia and Singapore stood at around 33,000 vehicles a year, with Singapore accounting for 25% of sales.

However, political differences dominated and the MVAA common market proposal was refused. The Malaysian government later restricted automobile imports from Singapore and revised its automotive policy, forcing investors to choose between the two countries. The Singaporean government later presented its own automotive policy in 1967. It was largely identical to the original Malaysian policy, with only minor changes to local content definitions. By 1970, both Malaysia and Singapore boasted a roughly equal number of assembly plants. The Singaporean plants were almost entirely backed by British and German companies, while the vast majority of Japanese companies backed Malaysian plants exclusively.

The Singaporean automotive industry showed strong initial promise, but was ultimately short lived. Rising costs, low local content, competition from Japanese cars, limited exports and a small domestic market had made local assembly unsustainable by the mid-1970s. In July 1979, the Singaporean government announced plans to abolish preferential treatment for all local assemblers by the end of 1980. By July 1980, all major car assembly plants in Singapore had shut down.

==== The automotive industry in Malaysia begins ====
In mid-1967, the Malaysian government approved applications for six automobile assembly plants.

Pioneer assembly plants of 1967 and 1968
Name of plant	Ownership (inception)	Investment (inception)	Location	Commenced operations (first roll-out)	Capacity (inception)	Marques assembled (up to June 1971)	Debut models
Kilang Pembena Kereta-Kereta (KPKK)	Sharikat Fiat Distributors (100%)	RM 2.0 million	Tampoi	August 1967	3,000	Fiat, Colt, Alfa Romeo	Fiat 600, 850 and 124
Swedish Motor Assemblies (SMA)	AB Volvo (50%); Federal Auto Company (50%)	RM 3.3 million	Shah Alam	November 1967	2,500	Volvo, Datsun	Volvo 144S
Champion Motors (CM)	Motor Investments Berhad (100%)	RM 8.6 million	Shah Alam	March 1968	6,000	Volkswagen, Toyota, Vauxhall, Mercedes-Benz, Chevrolet, Land Rover, Bedford, Audi	Volkswagen 1300 and Type 2 Toyota Corolla and Corona
Capital Motor Assembly (CMA)	Capital Motor Assembly Corporation (100%)	RM 5.0 million	Tampoi	May 1968	2,000	Opel, Datsun, Honda	Opel Rekord and Kadett
Associated Motor Industries Malaysia (AMIM)	Wearne Brothers Limited (100%)	RM 8.0 million	Shah Alam	June 1968	7,500	Renault, Ford, Holden, British Leyland (Albion, Austin, Morris), Rootes (Hillman, Commer), International Harvester	Renault R10
Asia Automobile Industries (AAI)	Peugeot S.A. (36.4%); Toyo Kogyo Co. (36.4%); Asia Motor Company (27.2%)	RM 6.0 million	Petaling Jaya	November 1968	5,000	Mazda, Peugeot	Mazda 1200; Peugeot 204

=== 1970s ===
==== Era of the Japanese car ====
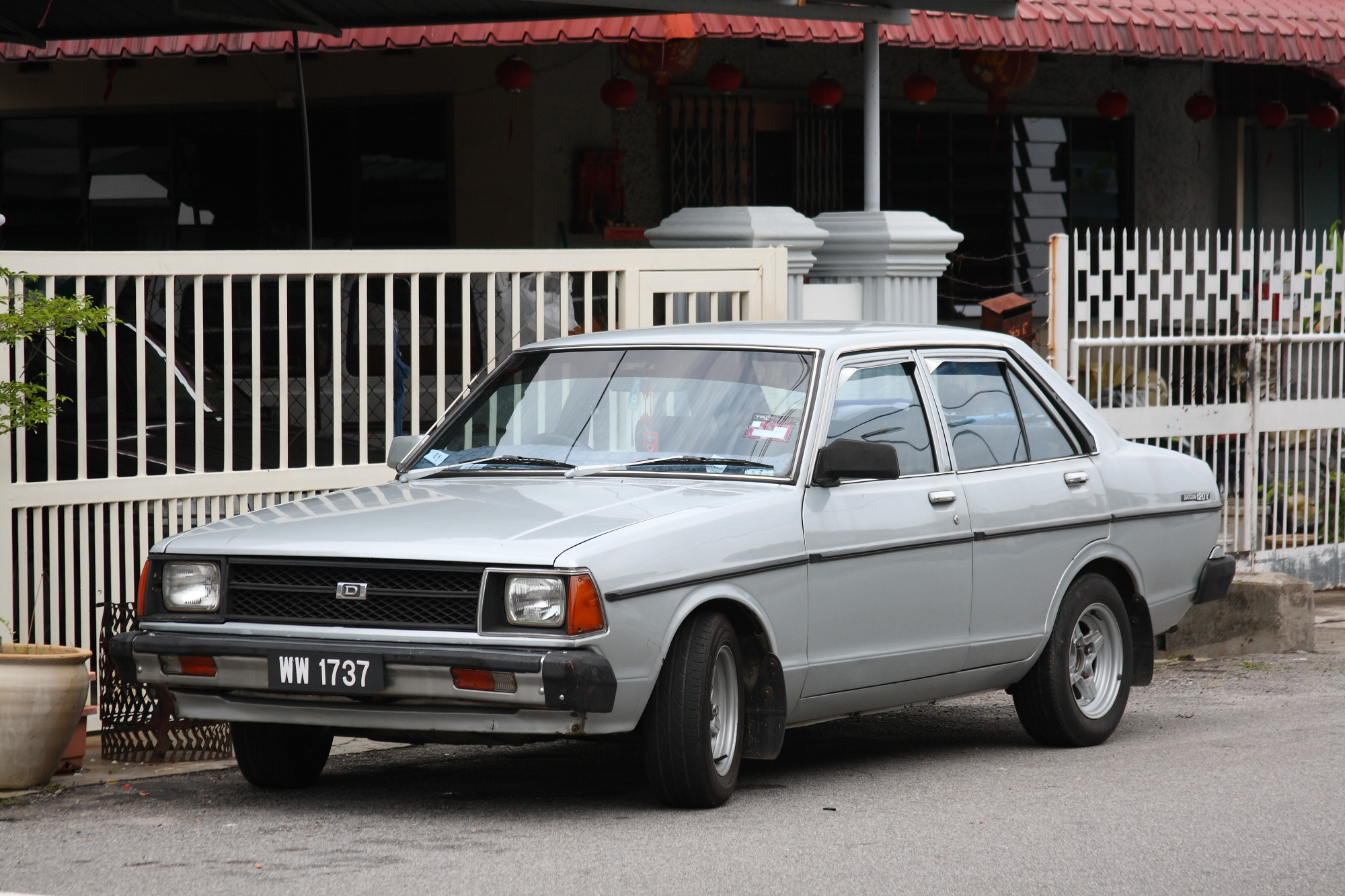
By 1980, Japanese marques had captured 80% of the West Malaysian market. (Datsun 120Y pictured)

For over six decades (1890s–1950s), Western car companies dominated the Malayan automobile market. But in the late 1950s, Japanese car companies rose to challenge the status quo. The tides shifted dramatically over the course of the 1960s, and by the end of the 1970s, Japanese car companies had become the dominant players in the Malaysian market.

The first Japanese cars arrived in Malaysia during the mid 1950s. Initially, the Japanese cars proved unpopular, and were perceived as inferior to their Western counterparts. The lightness and thin construction of the early Japanese cars were often criticised, and popularised the derogatory term 'Milo tin' in the 1960s. In addition to the quality concerns, anti-Japanese sentiment was still strong in 1950s and 1960s Malaysia, owing to bitter memories from the Japanese occupation several years prior.

However, the Japanese cars continued to improve and gained a reputation for quality, reliability, high fuel efficiency and value for money. The Japanese cars were also on average cheaper than their more premium Western counterparts. Only a handful of Western companies such as Ford, Morris and Fiat were able to match the affordability of the Japanese cars.

Datsun (later Nissan) lead the rise of Japanese cars in Malaysia. The greatest threat to Datsun's dominance came from another Japanese brand, Toyota. Both Toyota and Datsun battled fiercely for pole position in the Malaysian market, at times only fractions apart in total market share. Other Japanese car companies such as Mazda, Colt (later Mitsubishi) and Honda had also become well-established in Malaysia by the 1970s.

==== Inflation of car prices ====
West Malaysia passenger car sales comparison
1971			1981		
No.	Make	Sales	No.	Make	Sales
1	Datsun	4,485	1	Datsun	21,465
2	Toyota	3,210	2	Toyota	14,925
3	Ford	2,307	3	Mitsubishi	10,273
4	Mercedes-Benz	2,271	4	Mazda	10,092
5	Mazda	1,987	5	Honda	9,550
6	Peugeot	1,797	6	Ford	4,701
7	Volvo	1,483	7	Volvo	2,254
8	Colt	1,386	8	Daihatsu	2,242
9	Fiat	1,316	9	Mercedes-Benz	2,092
10	Austin	1,270	10	Opel	1,099

Prices of new cars in Malaysia had inflated significantly through the 1970s, with most if not all locally assembled CKD models generally costing more to produce than an equivalent CBU import.

The inflation of new car prices was attributed to several factors, including low efficiency and inadequate economies of scale among the parts manufacturers and assembly plants, the government's mandatory CKD deletion policy, high import and excise taxes for the CKD models, and various others. Additionally, the automotive industry in Malaysia was held back by a small domestic market, and manufacturers primarily served domestic demand and did not emphasise exports, thus limiting the growth and competitiveness of the industry as a whole.

=== 1980s ===
==== The National Car Project ====
By the dawn of the 1980s, the government concluded that direct involvement was necessary to reverse losses and spur future industrial growth. The National Car Project was drafted in the early 80s with the objective of accelerating technology transfer, increasing and rationalising local content, and involving more bumiputera entrepreneurs in the then largely ethnic Chinese dominated Malaysian automotive industry. The National Car Project would lead to the founding of Perusahaan Otomobil Nasional Sdn. Bhd. (Proton) in May 1983, and the launch of the Proton Saga in July 1985.

== Malaysian automotive market ==
=== Annual sales ===
==== TIV ====
Sales of new passenger and commercial vehicles in Malaysia, 1967–2016

Sales of new passenger and commercial vehicles in Malaysia, 1967–2023
Year	Volume	Growth
1967	16,615	N/A
1968	15,190	▼8.6%
1969	23,560	▲55.1%
1970	27,177	▲15.4%
1971	30,787	▲13.3%
1972	33,291	▲8.1%
1973	49,532	▲48.8%
1974	55,608	▲12.3%
1975	56,337	▲1.3%
1976	52,781	▼6.3%
1977	72,142	▲36.7%
1978	76,033	▲5.4%
1979	58,473	▼23.1%
1980	105,896	▲81.1%
1981	100,935	▼4.7%
1982	102,447	▲1.5%
1983	108,314	▲5.7%
1984	109,915	▲1.5%
1985	94,999	▼13.6%
1986	67,847	▼28.6%
1987	48,996	▼27.8%
1988	71,592	▲46.1%
1989	109,357	▲52.8%
1990	165,861	▲51.7%
1991	181,877	▲9.7%
1992	145,084	▼20.2%
1993	167,928	▲15.7%
1994	200,435	▲19.4%
1995	285,792	▲42.6%
1996	364,788	▲27.6%
1997	404,837	▲11.0%
1998	163,851	▼59.5%
1999	288,547	▲76.1%
2000	343,173	▲18.9%
2001	396,381	▲15.5%
2002	434,954	▲9.7%
2003	405,745	▼6.7%
2004	487,605	▲20.2%
2005	552,316	▲13.3%
2006	490,768	▼11.1%
2007	487,176	▼0.7%
2008	548,115	▲12.5%
2009	536,905	▼2.0%
2010	605,156	▲12.7%
2011	600,123	▼0.83%
2012	627,733	▲4.6%
2013	655,744	▲4.46%
2014	666,487	▲1.64%
2015	666,677	▲0.03%
2016	580,085	▼12.99%
2017	576,625	▼0.6%
2018	598,714	▲3.83%
2019	604,287	▲0.93%
2020	529,514	▼12.37%
2021	508,911	▼3.89%
2022	720,658	▲41.60%
2023	799,731	▲10.97%

==== Manufacturers sales ====
Manufacturers sales of new passenger and commercial vehicles in Malaysia, 2003–2020
Manufacturer	2003	2004	2005	2006	2007	2008	2009	2010	2011	2012	2013	2014	2015	2016	2017	2018	2019	2020
(Malaysia) Hicom	4,192	4,605	-	4,175	3,931	-	3,508	4,366	1,518	129	16	-	-	-	-	-	-	-
(Malaysia) Inokom	176	15,683	-	6,776	9,874	-	5,392	5,573	5,337	-	-	-	-	-	-	-	-	-
(Malaysia) Naza	7,754	10,377	-	31,763	20,286	-	11,119	9,362	9,347	7,953	3,236	12	2	-	-	-	-	-
(Malaysia) Perodua	124,008	121,804	-	155,419	162,152	-	166,736	188,641	179,989	189,137	196,071	195,579	213,307	207,110	204,887	227,243	240,341	220,163
(Malaysia) Proton	157,313	168,616	-	115,706	118,134	-	148,031	157,274	158,657	141,121	138,753	115,783	102,174	72,290	70,992	64,744	100,183	108,524
(Malaysia) TD Cars	-	-	-	1	-	-	-	-	-	-	-	-	-	-	-	-	-	-
(Japan) Daihatsu	5,637	5,911	-	5,333	5,055	-	3,990	2,989	2,118	1,452	1,156	1,207	967	885	803	991	1,409	1,410
(Japan) Hino	981	1,902	-	2,024	2,262	-	3,014	4,590	5,829	6,433	7,002	6,380	4,929	5,901	5,002	5,808	5,520	3,697
(Japan) Honda	17,087	24,857	-	26,527	28,478	-	38,783	44,483	32,480	34,950	51,544	77,495	94,902	91,830	109,511	102,282	85,418	60,468
(Japan) Isuzu	1,258	1,168	-	2,131	3,119	-	5,378	6,144	9,299	10,673	12,061	12,366	12,655	12,818	10,979	11,178	8,983	8,820
(Japan) Lexus	-	-	-	-	195	-	304	431	1,711	1,471	1,336	1,601	2,101	1,353	953	1,011	918	819
(Japan) Mazda	917	1,155	-	778	1,059	-	1,444	4,325	6,028	6,332	9,197	11,382	14,325	12,493	9,730	16,038	11,651	12,141
(Japan) Mitsubishi	6,715	4,692	-	2,806	4,414	-	6,981	11,899	12,054	11,652	12,348	14,322	11,076	9,395	7,034	9,261	8,140	9,163
(Japan) Mitsubishi Fuso	-	-	-	1,150	1,300	-	1,391	1,795	1,756	2,180	2,532	2,288	2,430	2,407	2,170	2,307	1,841	1,638
(Japan) Nissan	18,143	24,263	-	22,578	18,569	-	31,493	34,701	32,276	36,271	53,156	46,352	47,235	40,706	27,154	28,610	21,239	14,160
(Japan) Subaru	-	12	-	31	10	-	40	24	17	53	1,084	1,644	2,539	3,873	4,782	5,175	2,864	1,222
(Japan) Suzuki	227	253	-	1,606	2,583	-	4,994	6,748	7,308	8,087	4,962	4,273	3,351	87	-	-	-	-
(Japan) Toyota	40,239	51,700	-	81,808	81,993	-	81,785	91,559	86,951	105,151	91,185	102,035	93,760	63,757	69,492	65,551	69,091	58,501
(Japan) UD Trucks	-	-	-	-	-	-	-	-	-	-	-	-	1,037	970	865	676	446	420
(South Korea) Hyundai	-	16,133	-	5,413	3,735	-	2,562	4,931	6,469	11,938	12,217	10,271	6,286	5,100	4,110	2,949	2,256	1,400
(South Korea) Kia	7,079	13,053	-	7,941	3,158	-	3,164	968	1,741	4,374	7,184	9,926	4,674	4,370	4,131	5,658	3,432	759
(South Korea) SsangYong	-	1,054	-	658	579	-	102	281	257	238	292	207	109	-	-	-	-	-
(Germany) Audi	-	-	-	-	-	-	435	741	927	1,414	3,102	1,630	1,515	986	684	150	-	-
(Germany) BMW	2,145	2,574	-	3,302	3,162	-	3,564	4,006	5,000	6,318	7,057	7,808	7,515	9,000	10,618	12,008	9,300	8,836
(Germany) MAN	151	77	-	91	88	-	105	112	277	168	234	130	221	226	240	180	68	80
(Germany) Maybach	-	-	-	-	-	-	-	1	-	-	-	-	-	-	-	-	-	-
(Germany) Mercedes-Benz	3,306	3,387	-	3,805	3,994	-	4,156	5,144	5,710	5,905	5,550	7,131	11,034	12,017	12,344	13,462	10,535	-
(Germany) Porsche	24	49	-	76	74	-	74	126	415	395	275	349	567	430	395	342	367	399
(Germany) Smart	-	26	-	322	566	-	-	-	-	-	-	-	-	-	-	-	-	-
(Germany) Volkswagen	-	-	-	-	757	-	885	2,810	7,350	13,003	9,538	8,916	6,405	6,048	6,536	7,001	5,559	3,379
(United States) Chevrolet	-	5,906	-	991	1,211	-	557	540	1,272	2,026	1,673	1,792	952	953	499	234	3	-
(United States) Ford	4,652	4,401	-	3,458	2,781	-	1,826	2,857	7,188	7,108	10,660	13,938	12,130	8,001	6,255	6,755	5,641	5,170
(France) Citroën	396	752	-	188	32	-	-	-	-	-	-	-	-	-	-	-	-	-
(France) Peugeot	-	-	-	-	-	-	1,258	2,562	5,345	6,114	6,505	5,498	2,986	1,710	1,924	2,302	1,897	1,035
(France) Renault	107	192	-	836	644	-	246	216	132	90	44	259	478	599	592	1,009	1,218	911
(Sweden) Saab	22	39	-	21	2	-	-	-	-	-	-	-	-	-	-	-	-	-
(Sweden) Scania	110	187	-	279	210	-	433	443	483	466	577	712	518	349	486	568	492	187
(Sweden) Volvo	1,097	1,256	-	1,039	1,133	-	706	839	1,006	937	861	1,211	601	947	1,027	1,413	1,883	1,950
(Sweden) Volvo Trucks	-	-	-	-	-	-	-	-	-	-	-	-	353	370	380	450	478	283
(United Kingdom) Jaguar	-	-	-	-	-	-	-	-	-	-	-	36	90	80	57	42	20	33
(United Kingdom) Land Rover	587	724	-	295	421	-	72	189	220	643	1,003	844	659	254	161	216	173	162
(United Kingdom) Mini	-	-	-	170	184	-	214	222	301	341	437	655	829	902	1,011	1,200	1,142	982
(Italy) Fiat	-	169	-	-	-	-	-	-	-	-	-	-	-	-	-	-	-	-
(Italy) Iveco	3	-	-	-	-	-	-	-	-	-	-	-	-	-	-	-	-	-
(Italy) Lamborghini	-	-	-	-	-	-	-	-	-	-	-	-	-	7	4	-	-	-
(Turkey) BMC	138	38	-	19	3	-	-	-	-	-	-	-	-	-	-	-	-	-
(China) Auman	-	-	-	-	-	-	-	-	-	51	151	128	163	94	54	56	56	32
(China) BAW	-	-	-	-	-	-	-	-	19	27	29	16	17	17	11	2	-	-
(China) BeiBen	-	-	-	-	-	-	-	-	-	33	70	49	36	28	13	27	48	15
(China) Bison	-	-	-	-	-	-	-	-	239	305	191	211	111	83	123	211	173	141
(China) CAM/Sendok	-	-	-	-	-	-	-	-	-	-	-	-	-	-	-	442	499	310
(China) CAMC	-	-	-	-	-	-	-	-	-	253	372	558	396	188	209	182	74	53
(China) Chana	-	-	-	-	-	-	-	-	-	100	226	341	529	217	95	77	123	131
(China) Chery	-	-	-	152	332	-	1,871	3,041	2,997	1,636	740	350	296	491	137	-	-	-
(China) Dongfeng	-	-	-	337	211	-	155	155	19	-	-	-	-	-	-	-	-	-
(China) Foton	-	-	-	-	-	-	-	-	-	-	-	-	-	-	-	-	121	127
(China) Grand Tiger	-	-	-	-	-	-	-	-	-	51	20	26	21	13	3	-	-	-
(China) GWM	-	-	-	-	-	-	-	-	3	173	281	85	-	-	-	-	-	-
(China) Hoka	-	-	-	-	-	-	-	-	-	-	-	-	-	-	-	1	-	-
(China) JAC	-	-	-	-	-	-	-	-	-	134	200	280	147	106	74	59	61	51
(China) JBC	-	-	-	-	-	-	-	-	87	181	157	88	55	27	43	12	36	5
(China) JMC	-	-	-	-	-	-	-	-	-	-	-	-	-	-	-	41	44	36
(China) Kama	-	-	-	-	-	-	-	-	-	-	-	-	-	-	-	2	-	-
(China) King Long	-	-	-	-	-	-	-	-	-	-	-	-	-	-	-	118	55	61
(China) Sinotruk	-	-	-	-	-	-	-	-	-	285	483	282	134	-	-	651	425	221
(China) Tuah	-	-	-	258	108	-	46	16	3	-	-	-	-	-	-	-	-	-
(China) Yutong	-	-	-	-	-	-	-	-	-	-	16	41	44	26	2	-	-	-
(India) Mahindra	-	-	-	177	95	-	47	52	10	1	9	-	-	-	-	-	-	-
(India) Tata	546	590	-	328	282	-	44	-	-	-	-	-	16	571	53	53	64	84
Manufacturer	2003	2004	2005	2006	2007	2008	2009	2010	2011	2012	2013	2014	2015	2016	2017	2018	2019	2020

==== Top-selling manufacturers ====
Top 15 manufacturers in Malaysia by market share of new passenger and commercial vehicle sales, 1969–2020
Year	Manufacturers														
Position	1	2	3	4	5	6	7	8	9	10	11	12	13	14	15
1969; P/C	Volkswagen	Toyota	not available	Ford (11.9%)	Mercedes-Benz	Austin	Morris	Peugeot	Datsun (5.4%)	Mazda	not available				
1970; P/C	Datsun (13.0%)	Ford (11.9%)	Mercedes-Benz (8.6%)	Toyota (8.4%)	Fiat (6.2%)	Volkswagen (5.9%)	Peugeot (5.9%)	Austin (5.5%)	Mazda (4.8%)	Morris (4.3%)	Volvo (3.8%)	Colt (3.5%)	not available		
1971; P/C	Datsun (15.8%)	Toyota (11.4%)	Ford (8.2%)	Mercedes-Benz (8.0%)	Mazda (7.0%)	Peugeot (6.4%)	Volvo (5.3%)	Colt (4.9%)	Fiat (4.6%)	Austin (4.5%)	Volkswagen (4.0%)	Morris (3.9%)	not available		
1972 not available
1973; P/C	Toyota	not available													
1974; P/C	Toyota (16.0%)	Datsun (15.7%)	Ford (12.5%)	Mazda (9.7%)	Peugeot (6.8%)	Colt (6.5%)	Mercedes-Benz (6.5%)	Fiat (5.4%)	Opel (3.5%)	not available					
1975; P/C	Toyota (15.0%)	Datsun (14.9%)	Ford (11.1%)	Mazda (10.9%)	Colt/Mitsubishi (6.4%)	Fiat (6.0%)	Mercedes-Benz (5.7%)	Peugeot (5.3%)	Opel (4.6%)	Morris (2.5%)	not available				
1976; P/C	Toyota (17.1%)	Datsun (16.9%)	Mazda (10.7%)	Ford	Mitsubishi	Opel	Mercedes-Benz	Honda	Peugeot	Bedford	not available				
1977; P/C	Datsun (19.2%)	Toyota (17.4%)	not available												
1978; P/C	Datsun (22.0%)	Toyota (13.8%)	not available												
1979; P/C	Toyota (14.6%)	Datsun (13.5%)	not available												
Position	1	2	3	4	5	6	7	8	9	10	11	12	13	14	15
1980; P/C	Datsun (26.7%)	Toyota (20.0%)	Mitsubishi	Honda	Mazda	Mercedes-Benz	Ford	not available							
1981; P	Datsun	Toyota	Mitsubishi	Mazda	Honda	Ford	Volvo	Daihatsu	Mercedes-Benz	Fiat	Opel	Suzuki	Subaru	Alfa Romeo	Peugeot
11M 1982; P	Datsun	Toyota	Honda	Mazda	Mitsubishi	Ford	Daihatsu	Volvo	Mercedes-Benz	Opel	not available				
1983 not available
1984; P	Nissan (27.5%)	Toyota (22.2%)	Honda (13.0%)	not available											
1985; P	Nissan (29.9%)	Toyota (21.7%)	Proton (11.0%)	Honda (9.1%)	Ford (6.5%)	Mazda (6.2%)	Daihatsu (5.1%)	Volvo (2.8%)	Mercedes-Benz (1.8%)	BMW (1.1%)	not available				
1986; P	Proton (46.8%)	Nissan (15.0%)	Toyota (10.6%)	Honda (7.9%)	Ford (4.7%)	Mazda (3.9%)	Daihatsu (3.4%)	Volvo (1.8%)	Mercedes-Benz (1.1%)	BMW (0.6%)	not available				
1987; P	Proton (64.8%)	Nissan (9.7%)	Honda (6.2%)	Toyota (4.3%)	Ford (3.1%)	Mazda (3.0%)	Volvo (2.7%)	Daihatsu (2.0%)	Mercedes-Benz (1.8%)	BMW (0.9%)	not available				
1988; P	Proton (73.2%)	Nissan (8.1%)	Honda (5.9%)	Toyota (5.5%)	Volvo (2.0%)	Daihatsu (1.8%)	Ford (1.0%)	Mercedes-Benz (0.6%)	BMW (0.6%)	Mazda (0.4%)	not available				
1989; P	Proton (65.6%)	Nissan (11.7%)	Honda (8.0%)	Toyota (5.5%)	Daihatsu (2.4%)	Volvo (2.1%)	Ford (1.8%)	BMW (1.1%)	Mercedes-Benz (0.9%)	not available					
Position	1	2	3	4	5	6	7	8	9	10	11	12	13	14	15
1990; P/C	Proton (40%)	Nissan (12.7%)	Toyota (11.0%)	Ford	Daihatsu	Honda	Isuzu	Mitsubishi	Mazda	Volvo	not available				
1991; P/C	Proton (44.5%)	Toyota (11.0%)	Nissan (10.1%)	not available	Ford	not available									
1992; P/C	Proton (52.2%)	Toyota	Nissan	Honda	Daihatsu	Ford	not available								
1993; P/C	Proton (58.5%)	Toyota (7.6%)	Nissan (7.3%)	Honda (5.8%)	not available										
1994; P/C	Proton (56.3%)	Toyota	Nissan	Honda	Daihatsu	Perodua (4.5%)	not available								
1995; P/C	Proton (50.1%)	Perodua (14.2%)	Toyota	Nissan	Daihatsu	not available			Ford	not available	Mercedes-Benz	not available			
1996; P/C	Proton (49.3%)	Perodua (15.2%)	Toyota	Honda	Nissan	Daihatsu	Isuzu	not available							
1997; P/C	Proton (49.5%)	Perodua (17.3%)	Toyota	Nissan	Honda	Isuzu	Daihatsu	not available							
1998; P/C	Proton (53.2%)	Perodua (27.3%)	Toyota	Nissan	Honda	not available									
1999; P/C	Proton (54.0%)	Perodua (28.6%)	Toyota (4.8%)	Nissan (3.4%)	Honda (1.6%)	Ford (1.1%)	Mitsubishi (1.0%)	Hicom (0.9%)	Daihatsu (0.9%)	Isuzu (0.7%)	Suzuki (0.6%)	Mercedes-Benz (0.4%)	BMW (0.4%)	Mazda (0.3%)	Volvo (0.3%)
Position	1	2	3	4	5	6	7	8	9	10	11	12	13	14	15
2000; P/C	Proton (52.1%)	Perodua (28.3%)	Toyota (5.5%)	Nissan (4.0%)	Ford (1.8%)	Honda (1.6%)	Mitsubishi (0.9%)	Hicom (0.9%)	Daihatsu (0.8%)	Mercedes-Benz (0.7%)	BMW (0.6%)	Volvo (0.6%)	Mazda (0.4%)	Isuzu (0.4%)	Suzuki (0.3%)
2001; P/C	Proton (52.9%)	Perodua (27.9%)	Toyota (5.7%)	Nissan (4.1%)	Ford (1.8%)	Mitsubishi (1.4%)	Honda (1.2%)	Daihatsu (0.9%)	Hicom (0.8%)	Mercedes-Benz (0.7%)	Isuzu (0.6%)	BMW (0.5%)	Volvo (0.4%)	Suzuki (0.3%)	Mazda (0.2%)
2002; P/C	Proton (49.4%)	Perodua (29.3%)	Toyota (6.3%)	Nissan (3.7%)	Mitsubishi (1.9%)	Kia (1.5%)	Honda (1.4%)	Ford (1.4%)	Daihatsu (1.0%)	Hicom (0.9%)	Mercedes-Benz (0.8%)	BMW (0.6%)	Isuzu (0.4%)	Volvo (0.3%)	Mazda (0.2%)
2003; P/C	Proton (37.2%)	Perodua (29.3%)	Toyota (9.5%)	Inokom/Hyundai	Nissan	Honda	Naza/Kia	Mitsubishi	Daihatsu	Ford	Hicom	Mercedes-Benz	BMW	Volvo	Hino
2004; P/C	Proton (34.6%)	Perodua (25.0%)	Toyota	Inokom/Hyundai	Honda	Naza/Kia	Nissan	Daihatsu	Chevrolet	Mitsubishi	Hicom	Ford	Mercedes-Benz	BMW	Hino
2005; P/C	Proton (30.3%)	Perodua (25.4%)	Toyota (16.5%)	Naza/Kia	Honda	Inokom/Hyundai	Nissan	not available		Ford	not available				
2006; P/C	Perodua (31.7%)	Proton (23.6%)	Toyota (16.7%)	Naza (6.5%)	Honda (5.4%)	Nissan (4.6%)	Kia (1.6%)	Inokom (1.4%)	Hyundai (1.1%)	Daihatsu (1.1%)	Hicom (0.9%)	Mercedes-Benz (0.8%)	Ford (0.7%)	BMW (0.7%)	Mitsubishi (0.6%)
2007; P/C	Perodua (33.3%)	Proton (24.2%)	Toyota (16.8%)	Honda (5.8%)	Naza (4.2%)	Nissan (3.8%)	Inokom (2.0%)	Daihatsu (1.0%)	Mitsubishi (0.9%)	Mercedes-Benz (0.8%)	Hicom (0.8%)	Hyundai (0.8%)	BMW (0.6%)	Kia (0.6%)	Isuzu (0.6%)
6M 2008; P/C	Perodua (30.1%)	Proton (26.2%)	Toyota (19.1%)	Honda (6.0%)	Nissan (5.4%)	Naza (2.4%)	Inokom (1.4%)	Mitsubishi (1.2%)	Daihatsu (1.0%)	Suzuki (0.9%)	Isuzu (0.8%)	Mercedes-Benz (0.8%)	Hicom (0.8%)	BMW (0.7%)	Hyundai (0.7%)
2009; P/C	Perodua (31.1%)	Proton (27.6%)	Toyota (15.2%)	Honda (7.2%)	Nissan (5.9%)	Naza (2.1%)	Mitsubishi (1.3%)	Inokom (1.0%)	Isuzu (1.0%)	Suzuki (0.9%)	Mercedes-Benz (0.8%)	Daihatsu (0.7%)	BMW (0.7%)	Hicom (0.7%)	Kia (0.6%)
Position	1	2	3	4	5	6	7	8	9	10	11	12	13	14	15
2010; P/C	Perodua (31.2%)	Proton (26.0%)	Toyota (15.1%)	Honda (7.4%)	Nissan (5.7%)	Mitsubishi (2.0%)	Naza (1.5%)	Suzuki (1.1%)	Isuzu (1.0%)	Inokom (0.9%)	Mercedes-Benz (0.9%)	Hyundai (0.8%)	Hino (0.8%)	Hicom (0.7%)	Mazda (0.7%)
2011; P/C	Perodua (30.0%)	Proton (26.4%)	Toyota (14.5%)	Honda (5.4%)	Nissan (5.4%)	Mitsubishi (2.0%)	Naza (1.6%)	Isuzu (1.5%)	Volkswagen (1.2%)	Suzuki (1.2%)	Ford (1.2%)	Hyundai (1.1%)	Mazda (1.0%)	Hino (1.0%)	Mercedes-Benz (1.0%)
2012; P/C	Perodua (30.1%)	Proton (22.5%)	Toyota (16.8%)	Nissan (5.8%)	Honda (5.6%)	Volkswagen (2.1%)	Hyundai/Inokom (1.9%)	Mitsubishi (1.9%)	Isuzu (1.7%)	Suzuki (1.3%)	Naza (1.3%)	Ford (1.1%)	Hino (1.0%)	Mazda (1.0%)	BMW (1.0%)
2013; P/C	Perodua (29.9%)	Proton (21.2%)	Toyota (13.9%)	Nissan (8.1%)	Honda (7.9%)	Mitsubishi (1.9%)	Hyundai/Inokom (1.9%)	Isuzu (1.8%)	Ford (1.6%)	Volkswagen (1.5%)	Mazda (1.4%)	Kia (1.1%)	BMW (1.1%)	Hino (1.1%)	Peugeot (1.0%)
2014; P/C	Perodua (29.3%)	Proton (17.4%)	Toyota (15.3%)	Honda (11.6%)	Nissan (7.0%)	Mitsubishi (2.1%)	Ford (2.1%)	Isuzu (1.9%)	Mazda (1.7%)	Hyundai/Inokom (1.5%)	Kia (1.5%)	Volkswagen (1.3%)	BMW (1.2%)	Mercedes-Benz (1.1%)	Hino (1.0%)
2015; P/C	Perodua (32.0%)	Proton (15.3%)	Honda (14.2%)	Toyota (14.1%)	Nissan (7.1%)	Mazda (2.1%)	Isuzu (1.9%)	Ford (1.8%)	Mitsubishi (1.7%)	Mercedes-Benz (1.7%)	BMW (1.1%)	Volkswagen (1.0%)	Hyundai/Inokom (0.9%)	Hino (0.7%)	Kia (0.7%)
2016; P/C	Perodua (35.7%)	Honda (15.8%)	Proton (12.5%)	Toyota (11.0%)	Nissan (7.0%)	Isuzu (2.2%)	Mazda (2.2%)	Mercedes-Benz (2.1%)	Mitsubishi (1.6%)	BMW (1.6%)	Ford (1.4%)	Volkswagen (1.0%)	Hino (1.0%)	Hyundai/Inokom (0.9%)	Kia (0.8%)
2017; P/C	Perodua (35.5%)	Honda (19.0%)	Proton (12.3%)	Toyota (12.1%)	Nissan (4.7%)	Mercedes-Benz (2.1%)	Isuzu (1.9%)	BMW (1.8%)	Mazda (1.7%)	Mitsubishi (1.2%)	Volkswagen (1.1%)	Ford (1.1%)	Hino (0.9%)	Subaru (0.8%)	Kia (0.7%)
2018; P/C	Perodua (38.0%)	Honda (17.1%)	Toyota (10.9%)	Proton (10.8%)	Nissan (4.8%)	Mazda (2.7%)	Mercedes-Benz (2.2%)	BMW (2.0%)	Isuzu (1.9%)	Mitsubishi (1.5%)	Volkswagen (1.2%)	Ford (1.1%)	Hino (1.0%)	Kia (0.9%)	Subaru (0.9%)
2019; P/C	Perodua (39.8%)	Proton (16.6%)	Honda (14.1%)	Toyota (11.4%)	Nissan (3.5%)	Mazda (1.9%)	Mercedes-Benz (1.7%)	BMW (1.5%)	Isuzu (1.5%)	Mitsubishi (1.3%)	Ford (0.9%)	Volkswagen (0.9%)	Hino (0.9%)	Kia (0.6%)	Subaru (0.5%)
2020; P/C	Perodua (41.6%)	Proton (20.5%)	Honda (11.4%)	Toyota (11.0%)	Nissan (2.7%)	Mazda (2.3%)	Mitsubishi (1.7%)	BMW (1.7%)	Isuzu (1.7%)	Ford (1.0%)	Hino (0.7%)	Volkswagen (0.6%)	Volvo (0.4%)	Fuso (0.3%)	Mercedes-Benz (U)
Position	1	2	3	4	5	6	7	8	9	10	11	12	13	14	15

==== Top-selling models ====
Top 10 best-selling models in Malaysia (new passenger and commercial vehicles), 1964–2024 Sources : MMTA / MAA, BSCB, Fiat Group World, data.gov.my Table indicators Mini (A) / Small (B) Car Medium (C) / Large (D) Car Van / MPV (M) Crossover / SUV (J) Pickup / Truck X ^{B} CBU import
Year	Models and Ranking										Year
Year	1st	2nd	3rd	4th	5th	6th	7th	8th	9th	10th	Year
4M 1964	Ford Cortina	not available									4M 1964
1965–1969 not available
1970	Toyota Corolla 1200	Datsun 1200	Volkswagen 1300	Volvo 144	Mazda 1200	not available					1970
1971	Datsun 1200	Toyota Corolla 1200	Volvo 144	Colt Galant 1300	not available						1971
1972–1975 not available
1976	Toyota Corolla	Datsun 120Y	not available								1976
1977–1982 not available
1983	Nissan Sunny	Toyota Corolla	Honda Accord	not available							1983
1984	Nissan Sunny	Toyota Corolla	Honda Accord	not available							1984
1985 not available
1986	Proton Saga	not available									1986
1987	Proton Saga	not available									1987
1988	Proton Saga	not available									1988
1989	Proton Saga	not available									1989
1990	Proton Saga	Nissan Vanette	Ford Econovan	Toyota LiteAce	Honda Accord	Toyota Corolla	Daihatsu Delta	Honda Civic	Nissan Sunny	Nissan Sentra	1990
1991	Proton Saga	Nissan Vanette	Honda Accord	Ford Econovan	Toyota LiteAce	Nissan Sunny	Toyota Corolla	Honda Civic	Daihatsu Delta	Toyota HiAce	1991
1992	Proton Saga Iswara	Toyota Corolla	Nissan Sunny	Honda Civic	Toyota LiteAce	Honda Accord	Daihatsu Delta	Nissan Vanette	Ford Laser	Ford Econovan	1992
1993	Proton Saga Iswara	Proton Wira	Honda Accord	Toyota Corolla	Nissan Sunny	Honda Civic	Nissan Vanette	Daihatsu Delta	Daihatsu Charade	Toyota HiAce	1993
1994	Proton Wira	Proton Saga Iswara	Perodua Kancil	Honda Accord	Toyota Corolla	Toyota HiAce	Honda Civic	Daihatsu Delta	Nissan Vanette	Mitsubishi Pajero	1994
1995	Proton Wira	Proton Saga Iswara	Perodua Kancil	Proton Satria	Proton Perdana	Toyota HiAce	Nissan Vanette	Honda Accord	Toyota Corolla	Honda Civic	1995
1996	Proton Wira	Proton Saga Iswara	Perodua Kancil	Proton Satria	Honda Civic	Nissan Vanette	Proton Tiara	Daihatsu Delta	Toyota HiAce	Isuzu Elf	1996
1997	Proton Wira	Perodua Kancil	Proton Saga Iswara	Proton Satria	Proton Tiara	Perodua Rusa	Honda Civic	Nissan Vanette	Isuzu Elf	Toyota Land Cruiser	1997
1998	Proton Saga Iswara	Perodua Kancil	Proton Wira	Proton Satria	Perodua Kembara	Daihatsu Charade	Perodua Rusa	Toyota Unser	Honda Civic	Toyota HiAce	1998
1999	Proton Wira	Perodua Kancil	Proton Saga Iswara	Perodua Kembara	Proton Satria	Toyota Unser	Proton Tiara	Proton Perdana V6	Nissan Vanette	Daihatsu Charade	1999
2000	Proton Wira	Perodua Kancil	Proton Saga Iswara	Perodua Kembara	Proton Perdana V6	Proton Waja	Proton Satria	Toyota Unser	Perodua Kenari	Nissan Vanette	2000
2001	Proton Wira	Perodua Kancil	Proton Waja	Proton Saga Iswara	Perodua Kembara	Toyota Unser	Perodua Kelisa	Perodua Kenari	Proton Perdana V6	Proton Satria	2001
2002	Proton Wira	Perodua Kancil	Proton Waja	Proton Saga Iswara	Perodua Kelisa	Perodua Kenari	Toyota Unser	Perodua Kembara	Proton Satria	Nissan Vanette	2002
2003	Proton Wira	Perodua Kancil	Proton Waja	Proton Saga Iswara	Perodua Kelisa	Perodua Kenari	Toyota Unser	Inokom Atos	Perodua Kembara	Toyota Vios	2003
2004	Perodua Kancil	Proton Saga (LMST)	Proton Wira	Proton Waja	Perodua Kelisa	Perodua Kenari	Proton Gen-2	Toyota Vios	Inokom Atos	Naza Ria	2004
2005	Perodua Kancil	Proton Wira	Proton Waja	Toyota Avanza	Proton Saga	Perodua Myvi	Proton Gen-2	Perodua Kelisa	Perodua Kenari	Toyota Vios	2005
2006	Perodua Myvi	Perodua Kancil	Proton Wira	Proton Saga	Toyota Avanza	Proton Waja	Proton Gen-2	Perodua Kelisa	Toyota Vios	Naza Citra	2006
2007	Perodua Myvi	Perodua Viva	Proton Saga	Toyota Avanza	Toyota Vios	Perodua Kancil	Proton Persona	Proton Wira	Toyota HiLux	Proton Waja	2007
2008	Perodua Myvi	Perodua Viva	Proton Saga (BLM)	Proton Persona	Toyota Vios	Toyota Avanza	Toyota Camry ^{B}	Toyota HiLux	Nissan Grand Livina	Proton Saga (LMST)	2008
2009	Perodua Myvi	Proton Saga	Perodua Viva	Proton Persona	Toyota Vios	Honda City	Proton Exora	Toyota HiLux	Nissan Grand Livina	Toyota Avanza	2009
2010	Perodua Myvi	Proton Saga	Perodua Viva	Proton Persona	Perodua Alza	Toyota Vios	Proton Exora	Honda City	Toyota HiLux	Nissan Grand Livina	2010
2011	Perodua Myvi	Proton Saga FLX	Perodua Viva	Proton Persona	Perodua Alza	Toyota Vios	Toyota HiLux	Proton Exora	Nissan Grand Livina	Honda City	2011
2012	Perodua Myvi	Proton Saga FLX	Perodua Viva	Perodua Alza	Toyota Vios	Toyota HiLux	Proton Persona	Proton Exora	Proton Prevé	Honda City	2012
2013	Perodua Myvi	Proton Saga FLX	Perodua Viva	Perodua Alza	Nissan Almera	Toyota HiLux	Toyota Vios	Proton Exora	Proton Prevé	Proton Persona	2013
2014	Perodua Myvi	Proton Saga FLX	Perodua Alza	Toyota Vios	Honda City	Perodua Viva	Perodua Axia	Toyota HiLux	Nissan Almera	Proton Persona	2014
2015	Perodua Axia	Perodua Myvi	Proton Saga FLX	Perodua Alza	Honda City	Toyota Vios	Nissan Almera	Toyota HiLux	Honda HR-V	Proton Iriz	2015
2016	Perodua Axia	Perodua Alza	Perodua Myvi	Proton Saga	Honda HR-V	Perodua Bezza	Honda City	Toyota Vios	Nissan Almera	Proton Iriz	2016
2017	Perodua Axia	Perodua Myvi	Perodua Bezza	Honda City	Proton Saga	Perodua Alza	Toyota Vios	Proton Persona	Honda HR-V	Toyota HiLux	2017
2018	Perodua Myvi	Perodua Axia	Perodua Bezza	Honda City	Proton Saga	Perodua Alza	Toyota HiLux	Toyota Vios	Proton Persona	Honda Civic	2018
2019	Perodua Myvi	Perodua Axia	Perodua Bezza	Proton Saga	Honda City	Perodua Aruz	Proton X70	Toyota Vios	Proton Persona	Honda HR-V	2019
2020	Perodua Myvi	Perodua Axia	Perodua Bezza	Proton Saga	Proton Persona	Perodua Aruz	Proton X70	Honda City	Toyota Vios	Perodua Alza	2020
2021	Perodua Myvi	Perodua Axia	Perodua Bezza	Proton Saga	Toyota Vios/Yaris	Proton X50	Perodua Ativa	Toyota HiLux	Honda City	Proton X70	2021
2022	Perodua Myvi	Perodua Bezza	Perodua Axia	Proton Saga	Honda City	Proton X50	Perodua Ativa	Toyota HiLux	Perodua Alza	Toyota Vios	2022
2023	Perodua Bezza	Perodua Myvi	Perodua Axia	Proton Saga	Perodua Alza	Perodua Ativa	Proton X50	Honda City	Toyota HiLux	Proton Persona	2023
2024	Perodua Bezza	Perodua Axia	Perodua Myvi	Proton Saga	Perodua Alza	Perodua Ativa	Honda City	Toyota Vios	Toyota HiLux	Proton X50	2024
2025	Perodua Bezza	Perodua Axia	Perodua Myvi	Proton Saga	Perodua Alza	Perodua Ativa	Toyota Vios	Toyota HiLux	Honda City	Proton X50	2025
	1st	2nd	3rd	4th	5th	6th	7th	8th	9th	10th	
See also : Best-selling models in: Australia; Brazil; India; Indonesia; Japan; Philippines; Thailand; Sweden

=== Vehicle population ===
According to the Ministry of Transport, the active passenger car population in Malaysia stood at 11 million units in 2014, with 10 passenger cars for every 27 citizens. An independent study estimated that the population stood at around 8.2 million units in 2014, after factoring in variables such as scrapped and permanently disabled passenger cars.

== Malaysian automotive manufacturers ==
=== Proton ===
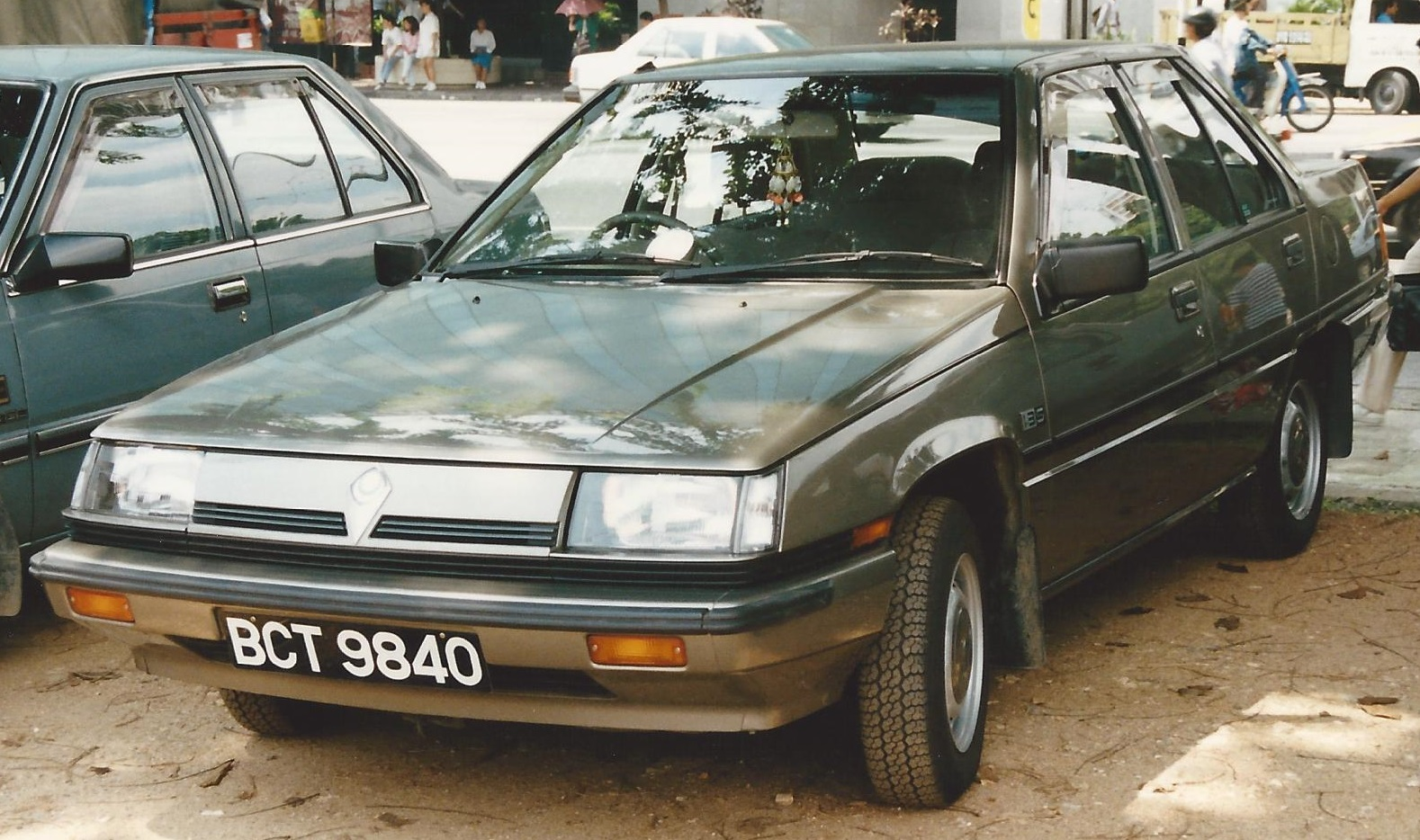
The first generation Proton Saga was produced at the original Shah Alam plant for 22 years.

National car company Proton currently operates three manufacturing plants in Malaysia, with a combined maximum annual capacity of 360,000 units. The original Proton plant in Shah Alam was built in 1985, and was later complemented by the smaller MVF plant in 2000. The third Proton factory near Tanjung Malim commenced operations in 2004, and was built as part of the Proton City project. Perusahaan Otomobil Nasional (PONSB) handles operations at both plants in Shah Alam, while Proton Tanjung Malim (PTMSB) operates the plant at Proton City.

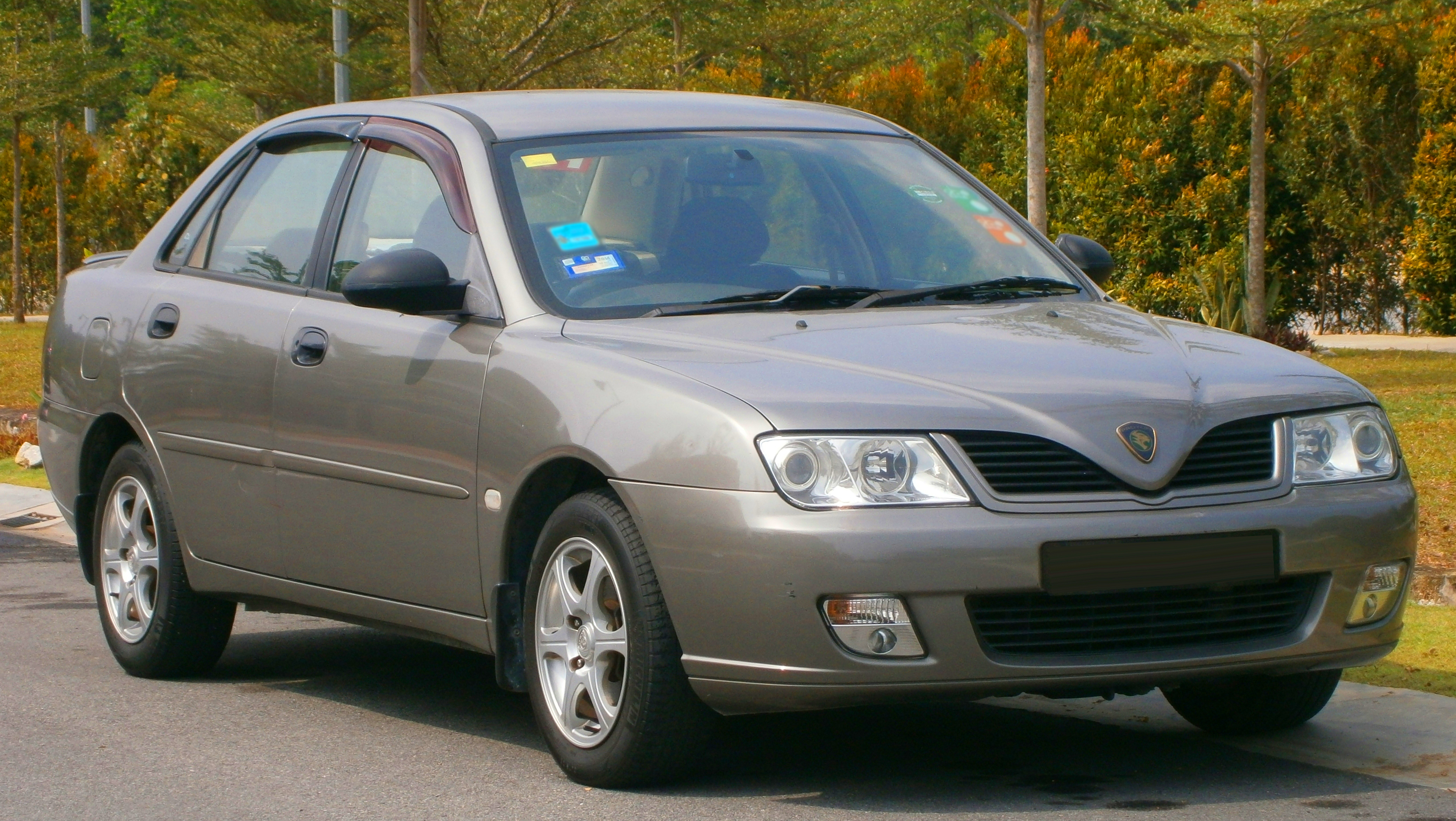
The Proton Waja became the debut model for the MVF plant.

Proton's first plant commenced operations in mid-1985, with the first unit being a Proton Saga 1.3L saloon. Initially, Proton had assembled the Saga with complete-knock down (CKD) kits, engines and components which were imported from Mitsubishi's facilities in Japan. Local content in the 1985 Proton Saga stood at 18%, with just 13 local components. By mid-1989, local content had risen to 69%, with over 453 Proton-manufactured components and a further 356 locally sourced parts from 56 local vendors. In June 1989, Proton commenced engine assembly at their dedicated Engine and Transmission Factory. The Proton plant became a symbol of national industrialisation, and was subsequently commemorated on the RM100 banknote in 1998.

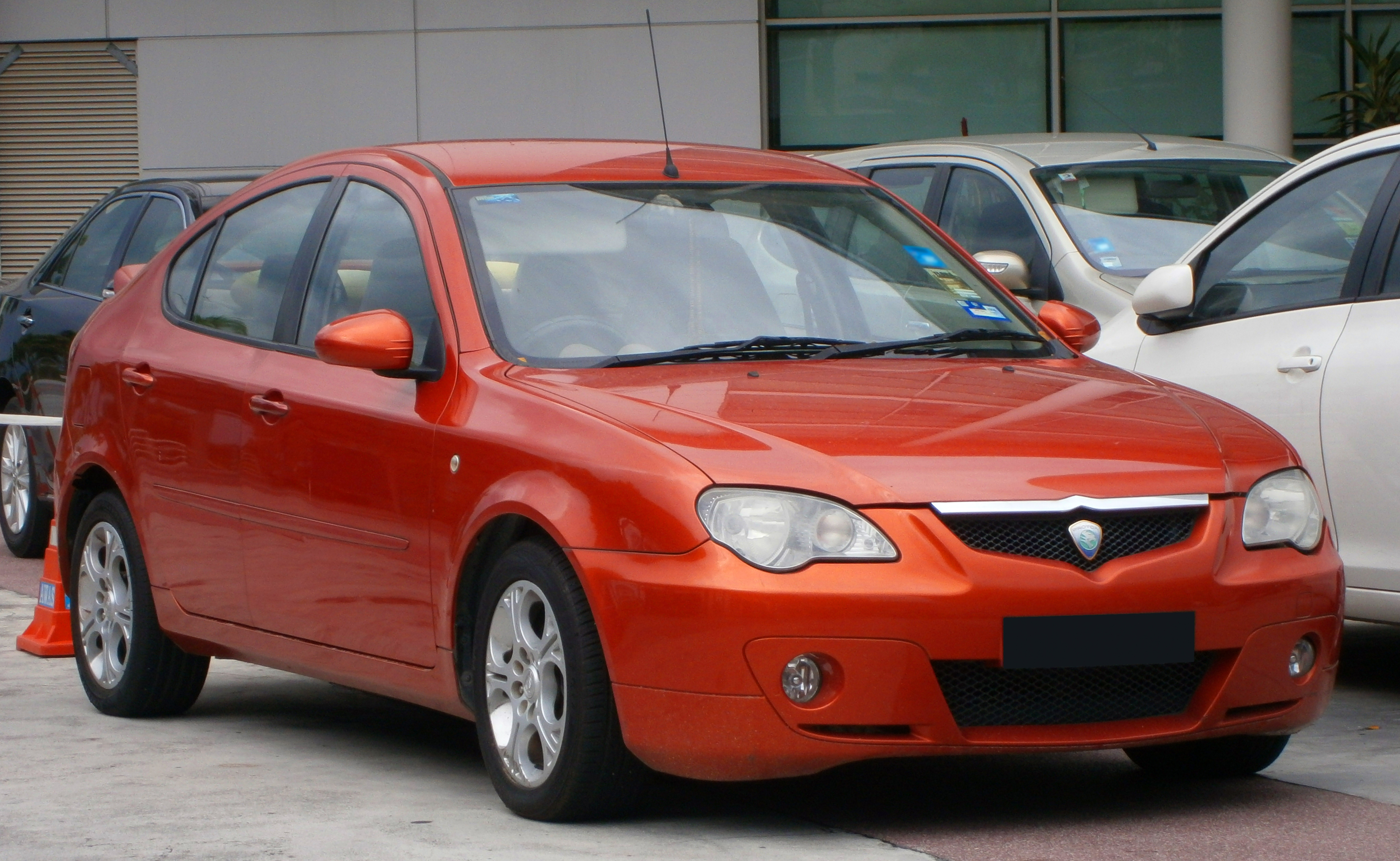
The Proton GEN•2 is the first model to roll out of the Tanjung Malim plant.

Construction of the Medium Volume Factory (MVF) was completed in 2000. The MVF plant was built adjacent to the original Proton factory, and produced the Proton Waja upon its debut. The MVF plant was built at a cost of RM400 million, and accommodated modern assembly practices like modular assembly and Automatic Line Control (ALC).

Construction of an all-new Proton factory commenced in 1996 near Tanjung Malim, in anticipation of increasing sales of Proton cars in the near future. However, its construction was deferred in late 1997 as a result of the Asian financial crisis. Construction resumed in January 2001, and was completed in 2003, and the plant's first Proton GEN•2 models rolled-off the production line in early 2004. Proton's Tanjung Malim complex is five times larger than their Shah Alam complex, and was built at a cost of RM1.8 billion. At its debut in 2004, the Tanjung Malim plant employed 2,000 workers, featured 180 robots, and had a 60% automation rate. It was billed as the most advanced automobile factory in the Asia-Pacific region, outside Japan and Korea.

Proton was originally owned in majority by HICOM with minority stakes being held by Mitsubishi Group members. By 2005, Mitsubishi had divested their stake in Proton to Khazanah Nasional, and in 2012, Proton was fully acquired by DRB-HICOM. In 2017, DRB-HICOM sold a 49.9% stake in Proton to Geely.

=== Perodua ===
Market sales leader Perodua currently operates two manufacturing plants in Malaysia, with a combined maximum annual capacity of 350,000 units. The first Perodua plant in Serendah commenced operations in 1994, and was later complemented by a larger adjacent factory in 2014. Perodua Manufacturing (PMSB) handles operations at the older plant, while Perodua Global Manufacturing (PGMSB) operates the newly built factory.

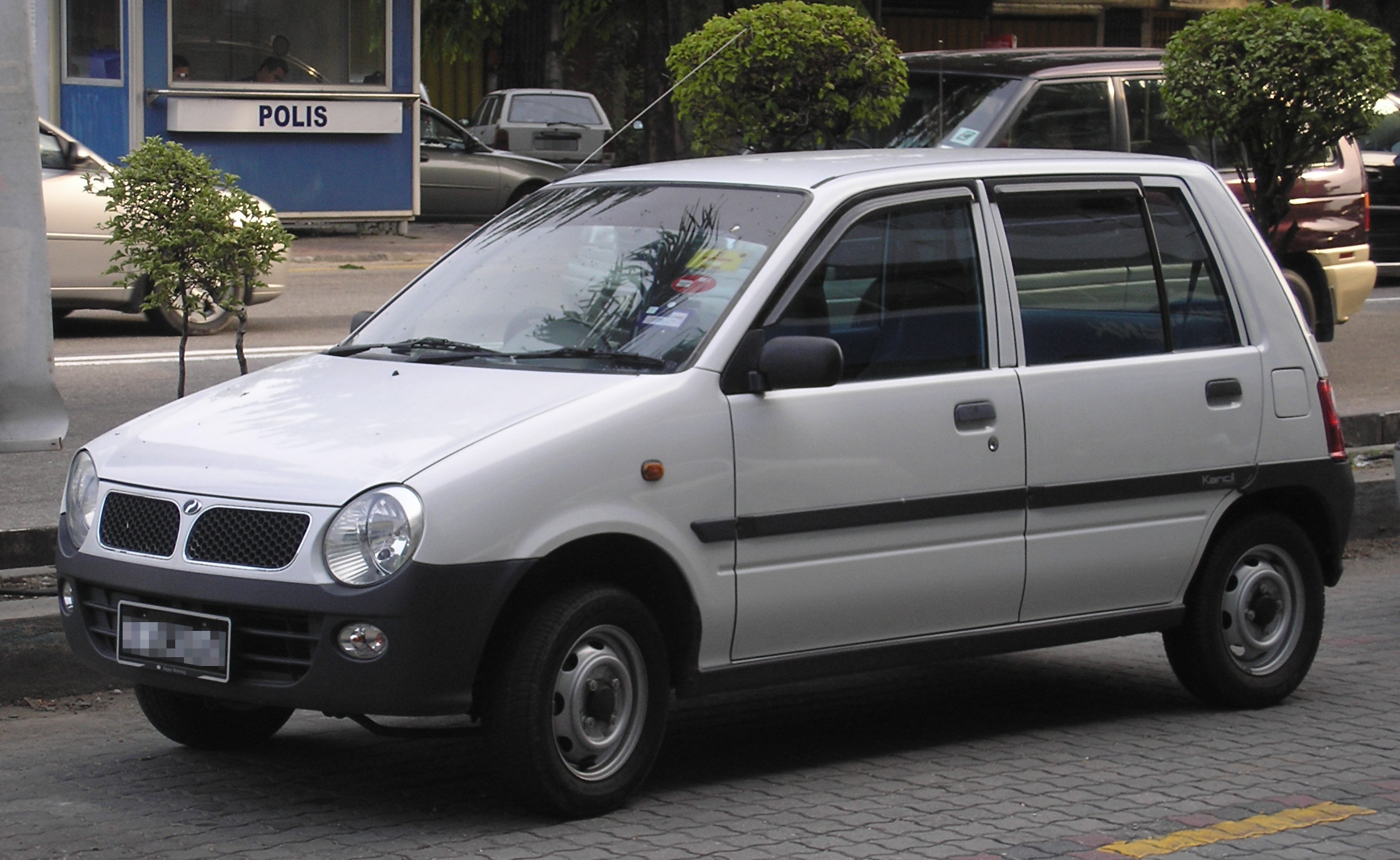
The Perodua Kancil was produced for 15 years at the original Serendah plant.

Perodua's first plant commenced operations in July 1994, with the first unit being a Perodua Kancil 660cc. Like Proton, Perodua benefited from Japanese technology transfer in its early stages of development. Perodua's products are based on Daihatsu-engineered platforms and engines, and Daihatsu has led Perodua's manufacturing operations since 2001. Perodua had previously assembled the first generation Toyota Avanza under contract, and the company currently produces models with Daihatsu badging for export to the Indonesian market.

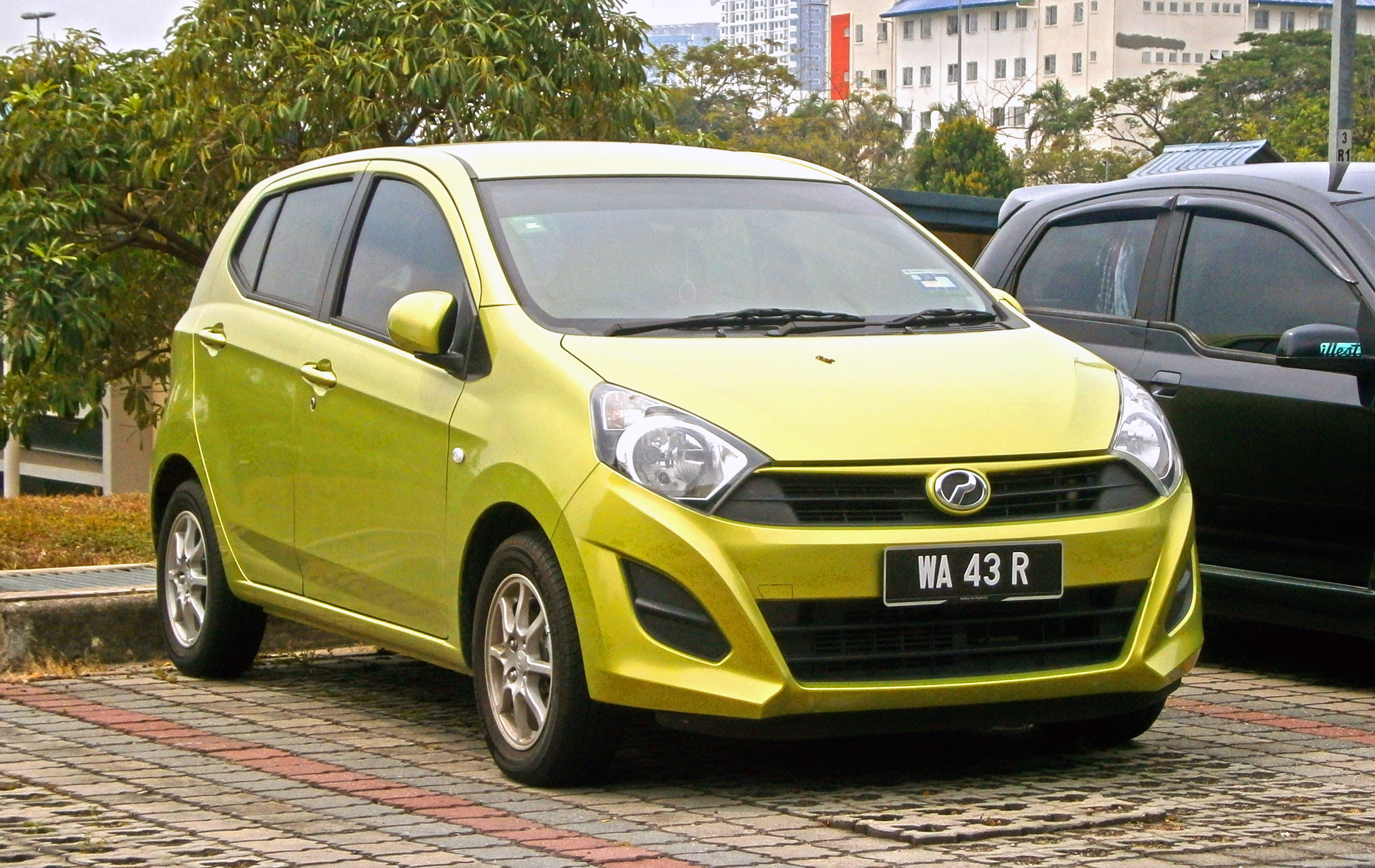
The Perodua Axia became the debut model for PGMSB.

In December 2012, Perodua announced plans for an all-new factory, to be built adjacent to their original plant in Serendah. Construction commenced in March 2013, and completed in late 2014, and the plant's first Perodua Axia models rolled-off the production line in August 2014. The all-new Perodua plant was built at a cost of RM1.3 billion, and is modelled after Daihatsu Motor Kyushu (DKC) Nakatsu Plant 2 in Japan. Perodua aims to emulate DKC's low defects per unit (DPU) rate and environmentally friendly practices.

In May 2014, Perodua and Daihatsu revealed plans for an all-new RM600 million engine manufacturing plant, to be built in Sendayan. Construction commenced in October 2014, and operations commenced in May 2016. The new engine plant is handled by Daihatsu Perodua Engine Manufacturing (DPEM), and currently produces the 1.3-litre, 1NR-VE and 1.5-litre, 2NR-FE engines for the Perodua Bezza and Malaysian-market Toyota Vios. Additionally, Perodua has a 10% stake in the Akashi Kikai (AKIM) transmission manufacturing plant, also in Sendayan. The all-new AKIM plant commenced operations in March 2014, and currently supplies manual and automatic gearboxes for Perodua's models.

=== Tan Chong Motor ===
Tan Chong Motor Holdings (TCMH) currently operates two manufacturing plants in Malaysia, with a combined maximum annual capacity of 100,000 units. Tan Chong Motor Assemblies (TCMA), a subsidiary of TCMH, handles all plant operations. TCMA assembles a large variety of foreign badged models from imported complete knock down (CKD) kits. The original TCMA plant in Segambut was built in 1976, and currently assembles Subaru, Mitsubishi and Renault models, in addition to various commercial vehicles. The second TCMA plant in Serendah commenced operations in 2007, and assembles Nissan models exclusively.

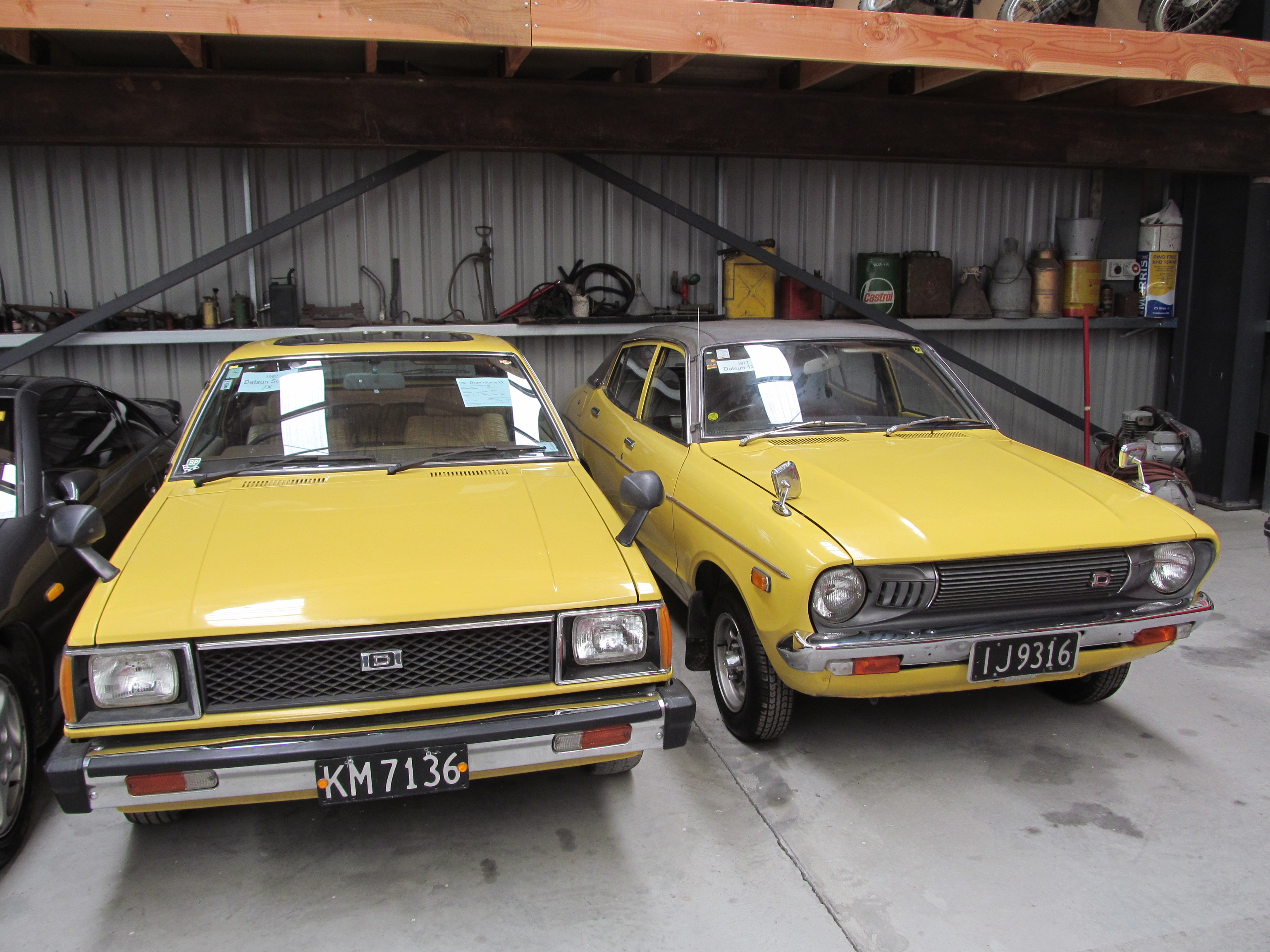
The TCMA-assembled Datsun 120Y was a best-seller in Malaysia.

Tan Chong Motor has been an active player in the Malaysian automotive industry since 1957. The company sold fully imported Datsun vehicles in its early years of business, but government initiatives prompted Tan Chong Motor to offer their first locally assembled Datsun models from mid-1968. Sales of Datsun cars grew significantly in the 1960s, and in 1970, Datsun became the best-selling brand of car in the Malaysian market. In mid-2003, Tan Chong Motor adopted the Renault brand in line with the Renault–Nissan Alliance.

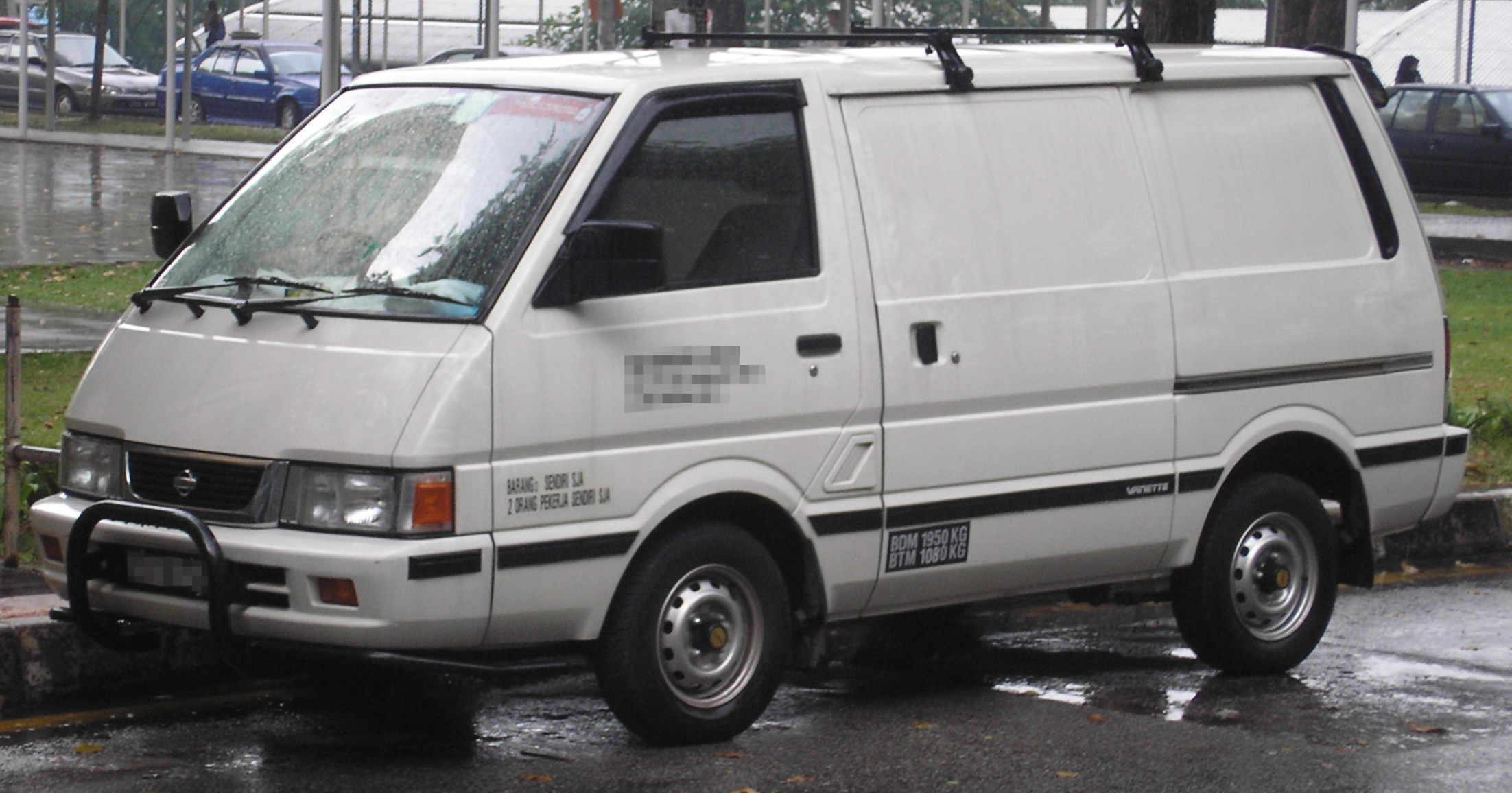
The Nissan Vanette became TCMA's first export model.

Tan Chong Motor constructed their own assembly plant at Segambut in 1976. The new TCMA plant was modelled after the Nissan Zama complex, and was the nation's first to use electro-dipping (ED) technology for its painting process. Nissan Japan regarded the TCMA plant as the third best foreign Nissan assembly plant in the world. The TCMA plant also became the nation's first to feature an engine assembly line in December 1988. TCMA had also pioneered women's rights in the traditionally male dominated automotive industry, with females accounting for 44% of their assembly workforce in 1989.

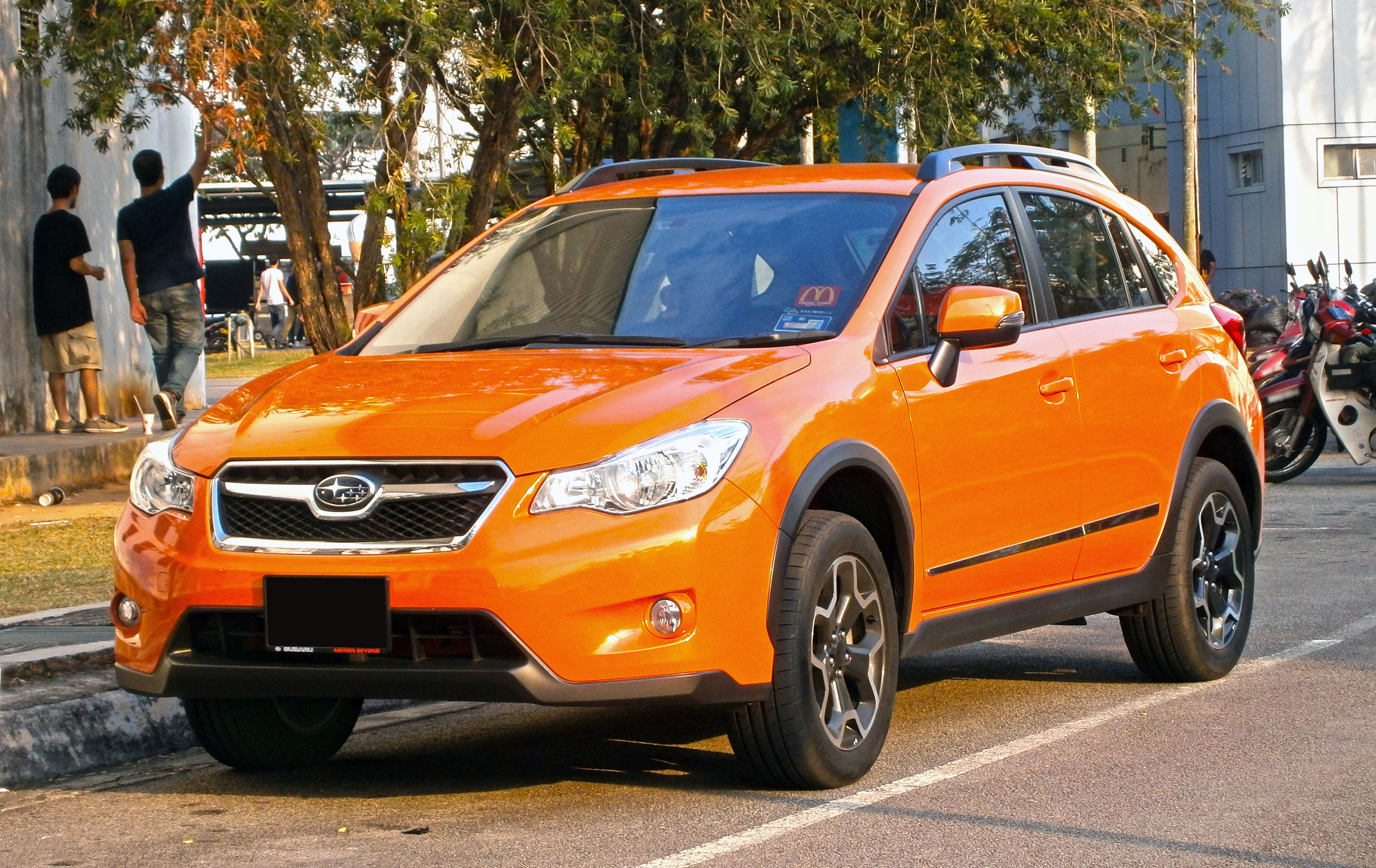
TCMA exported Subaru SUVs to Thailand and Indonesia.

The bulk of TCMA Segambut production historically consisted of Datsun/Nissan vehicles, but the plant has also carried out contract assembly for Subaru, Volkswagen, Audi, Peugeot and Renault models in the past. A small number of Malaysian-assembled Mercedes-Benz models were also sent to TCMA for painting. The TCMA Segambut plant has mainly catered to domestic consumption, and only a small number of vehicles were exported. Presently, both Subaru XV and Forester models assembled by TCMA Segambut are exported to Thailand and Indonesia, with export volume exceeding domestic consumption.

Construction for an all-new TCMA assembly plant at Serendah commenced in February 2006. The new plant complements the existing Segambut facility, and incorporate more advanced manufacturing standards under the Nissan Production Way (NPW). The Nissan Latio became the first model to roll off the new TCMA Serendah plant in 2007. Tan Chong Motor/Nissan is one of only two domestic-foreign joint venture companies to simultaneously operate two automobile assembly plants in Malaysia.

=== Honda Malaysia ===
Honda Malaysia (HM) currently operates an assembly plant in Pegoh, with a combined maximum annual capacity of 100,000 units. HM assembles Honda passenger cars from imported complete knock down (CKD) kits. Honda Malaysia's shareholders include the Honda Motor Company (51%), DRB-HICOM (34%) and Oriental Holdings (15%).

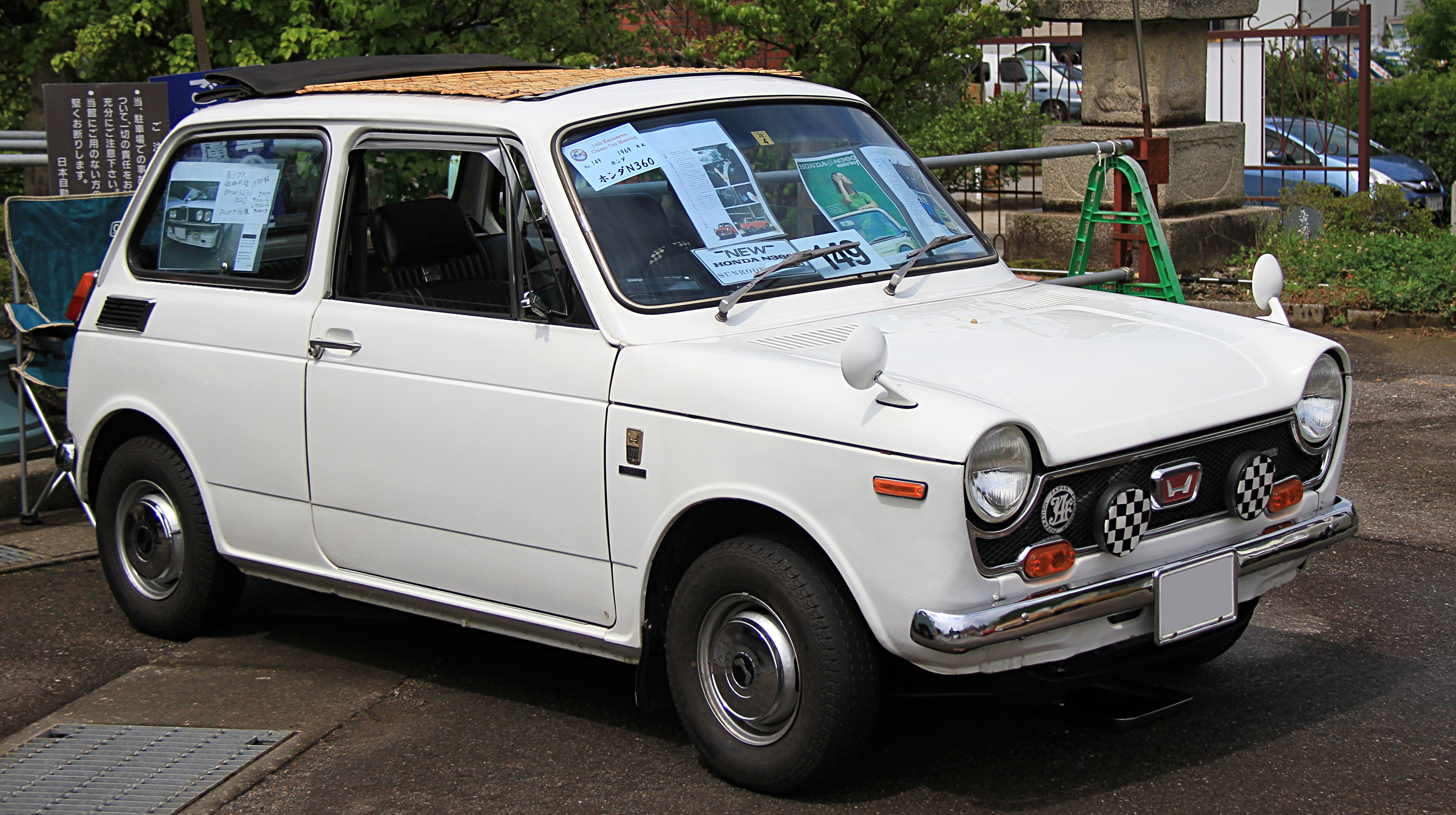
Oriental Holdings held the Honda franchise prior to Honda Malaysia. Honda cars were assembled in Malaysia since 1969.

Honda Malaysia was established in July 2000 as DRB-Oriental-Honda (DOH), a three-way joint venture between Honda, DRB-HICOM and Oriental. DOH was established to handle assembly, distribution and sales of Honda passenger cars in Malaysia. DRB-Oriental-Honda changed its name to Honda Malaysia (HM) in September 2002. Prior to the advent of Honda Malaysia, Honda operations in Malaysia were handled by Oriental Holdings and their associates, which collectively held the franchise rights for both Honda passenger cars and motorcycles in Malaysia. Honda passenger cars were assembled at the Oriental Assemblers plant in Tampoi, Johor, while Honda motorcycles were built at the Boon Siew Honda Assembly plant in Butterworth, Penang. Both plants had produced Honda models since 1969.

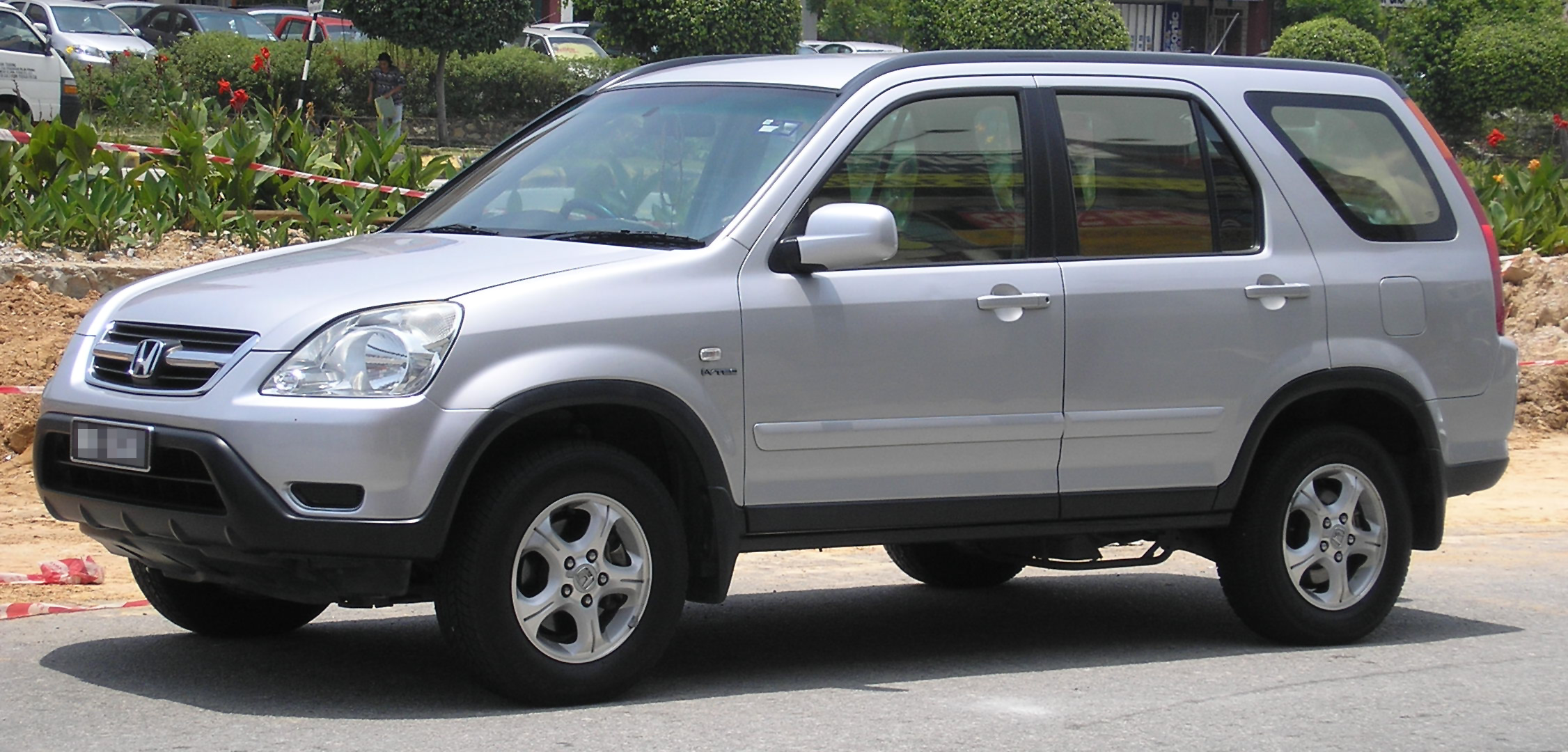
The second generation Honda CR-V became the debut model for the Pegoh plant.

By the late 1990s, Honda's principles in Japan had sought to become more directly involved in the Malaysian market. The decision was made in anticipation of the impending AFTA implementation in the early 2000s, a period in which many foreign car companies had increased their market presence in Malaysia. Additionally, various complications between Honda and the Oriental Group had also catalysed Honda's decision to establish a direct presence in the Malaysian market.

Under the DRB-Oriental-Honda joint venture, Oriental Holdings would concentrate on the marketing and sales of Honda vehicles, while Honda would handle assembly operations. The DOH joint venture only encompassed Honda passenger vehicles, while Honda motorcycle operations remained unchanged. Additionally, Honda had decided on the construction of an all-new assembly plant in Pegoh, Malacca, which would take over Honda assembly operations from Oriental Assemblers. Construction of the new plant commenced in August 2001, and was completed in November 2002. The Pegoh plant was built at the cost of RM180 million, with an initial capacity of 20,000 units annually. The earliest second generation Honda CR-V models rolled out of the Pegoh plant in December 2002. In addition to vehicle assembly, the Pegoh plant also manufactures constant velocity joints for both domestic and export markets. The plant produced its 100,000th car, a Honda Civic in November 2007.

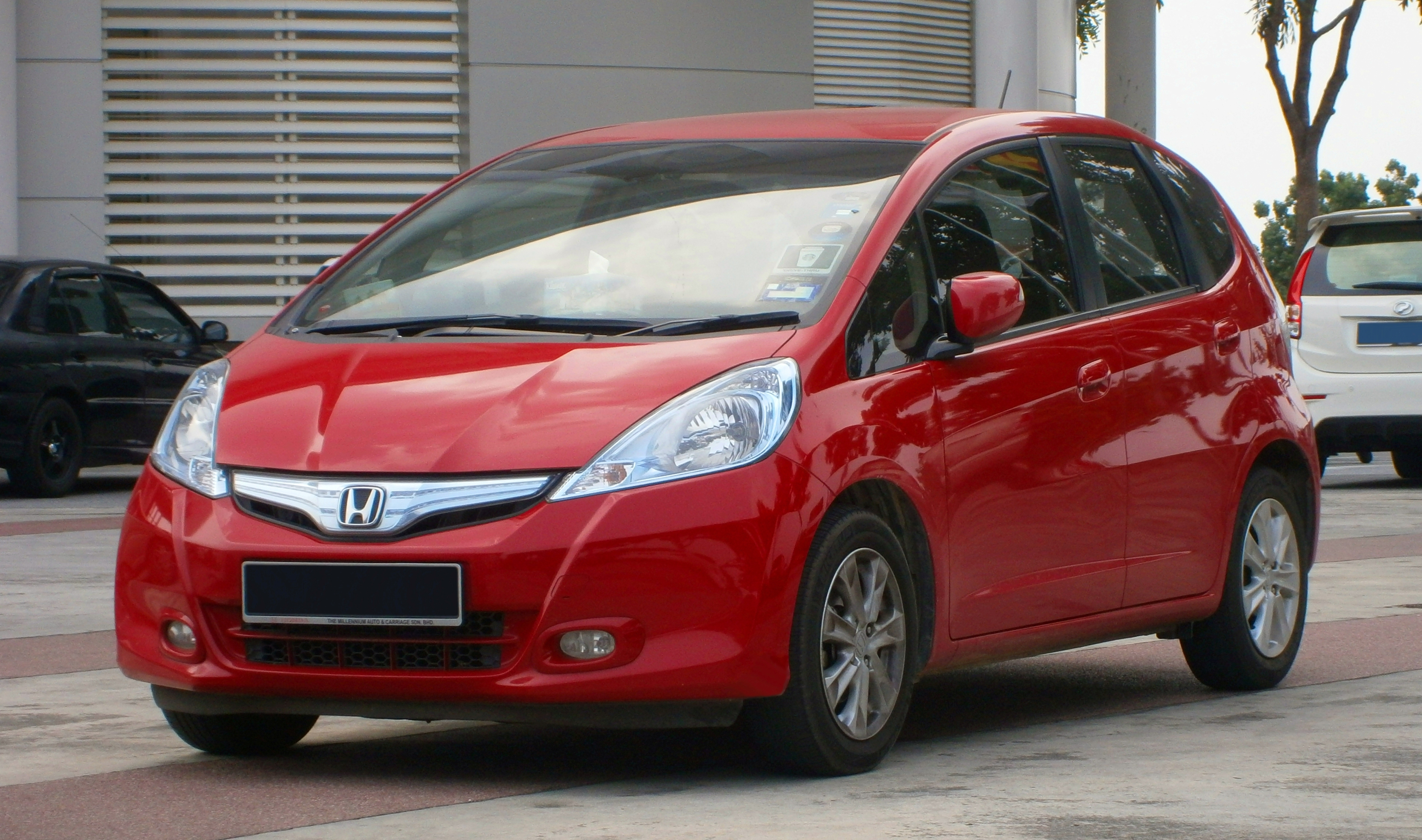
The Honda Jazz Hybrid (GE) became the first hybrid car to be assembled in Malaysia.

In November 2013, Honda Malaysia established a second vehicle assembly line at the Pegoh plant. The second line was built at the cost of RM382 million, and doubled annual production capacity from 50,000 to 100,000 units annually. Honda Malaysia's second line also became the first outside Japan to feature Honda's Smart Welding Machine technology.

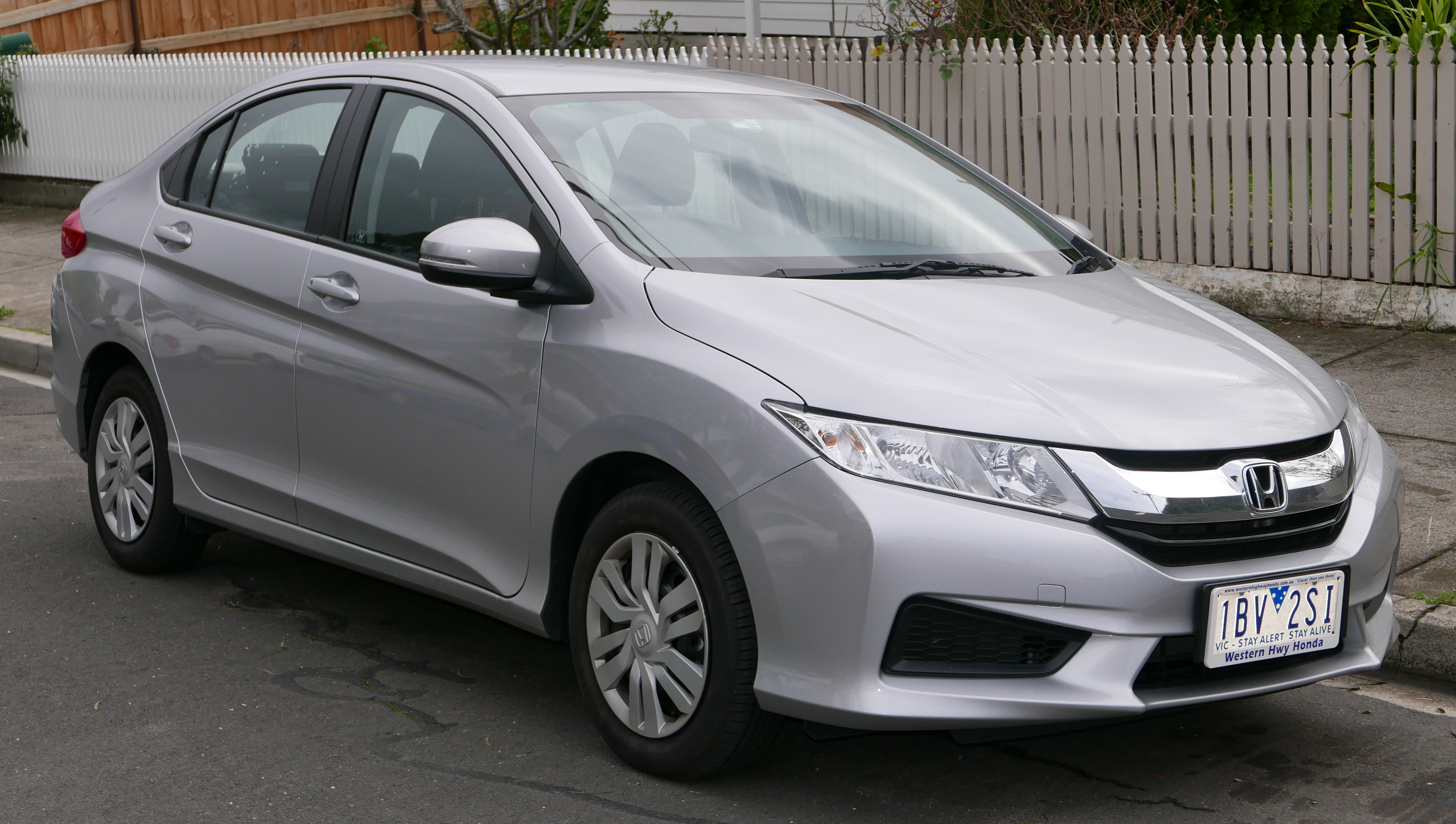
Honda Malaysia produced its 600,000th unit in March 2017.

Honda Malaysia's production, sales and market share grew significantly in the 2010s. In 2015, Honda surpassed arch-rival Toyota as the best-selling foreign-badged car company in Malaysia. The following year, Honda surpassed Proton to place second overall in the Malaysian market. Honda Malaysia currently assembles seven different models, the highest among any Japanese-badged car company in Malaysia. HM also assembles hybrid variants of the Jazz and City respectively.

=== Inokom ===
Inokom Corporation operates an assembly plant in Kulim with a combined maximum annual capacity of 30,000 units. Inokom is the licensed contract assembler for Hyundai, BMW and Mazda passenger vehicles in Malaysia. Inokom's shareholders include Sime Darby Motors (51%), Sime Darby Hyundai (5%), Hyundai Motor Company (15%) and Berjaya Auto (29%).

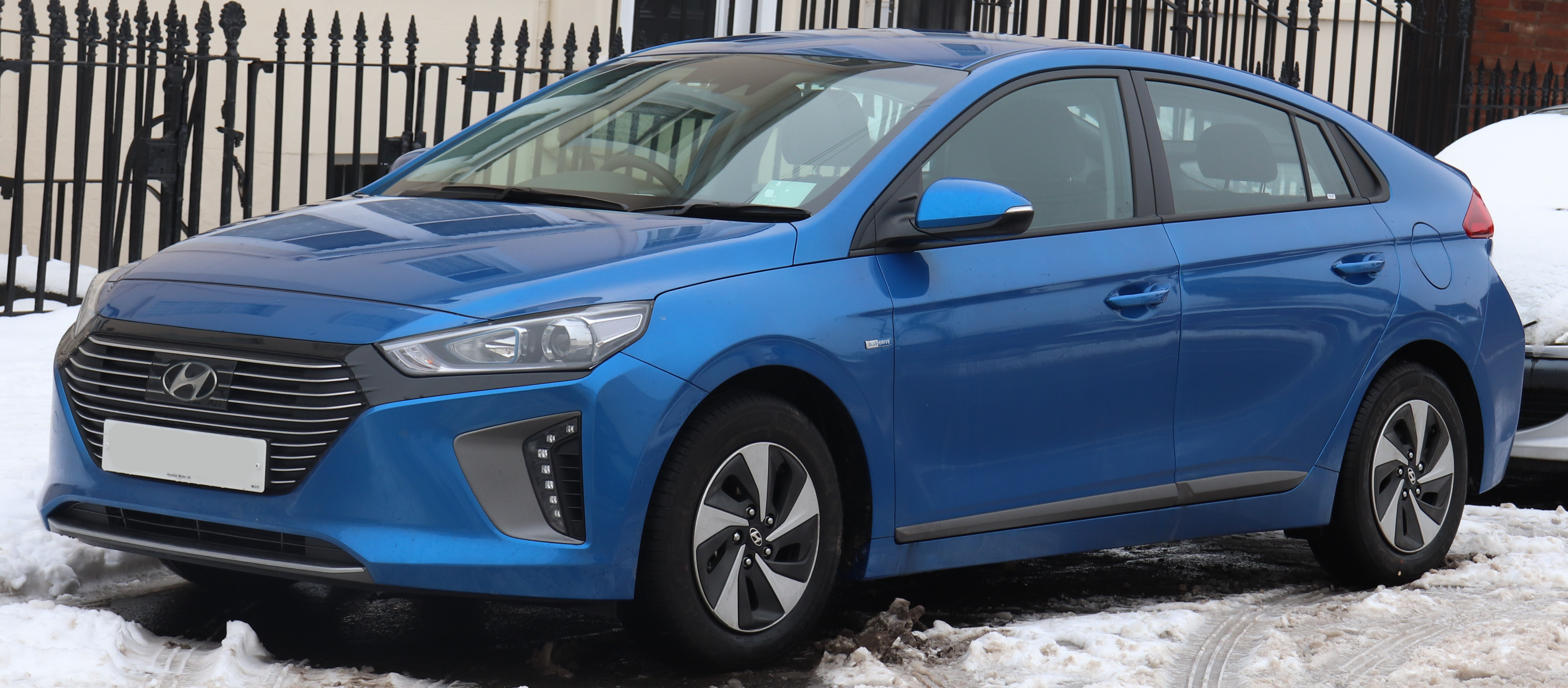
Inokom became the first to produce the Hyundai Ioniq outside Korea.

Inokom was established in 1992 as one of two national commercial vehicle companies. In its early years of business, Inokom produced rebadged Renault and Hyundai commercial vehicles exclusively. The company's first product, the Inokom Permas debuted in 1998. The Permas is based on the first generation Renault Traffic and was produced in various configurations at Inokom's new plant in Kulim, Kedah. In 2000, Inokom launched its second product, the Lorimas, a license-built Hyundai Porter.

In 2002, Inokom ventured into non-commercial vehicle production with the launch of the Hyundai-based Inokom Atos. In 2004, Sime Darby acquired a 51% stake in Inokom, and by the 2010s, all Hyundai assembly operations in Malaysia were centralised at the Inokom plant. Prior to the consolidation, Hyundai models were assembled at two separate plants, namely the Inokom plant in Kulim and the Oriental Assemblers plant in Tampoi.

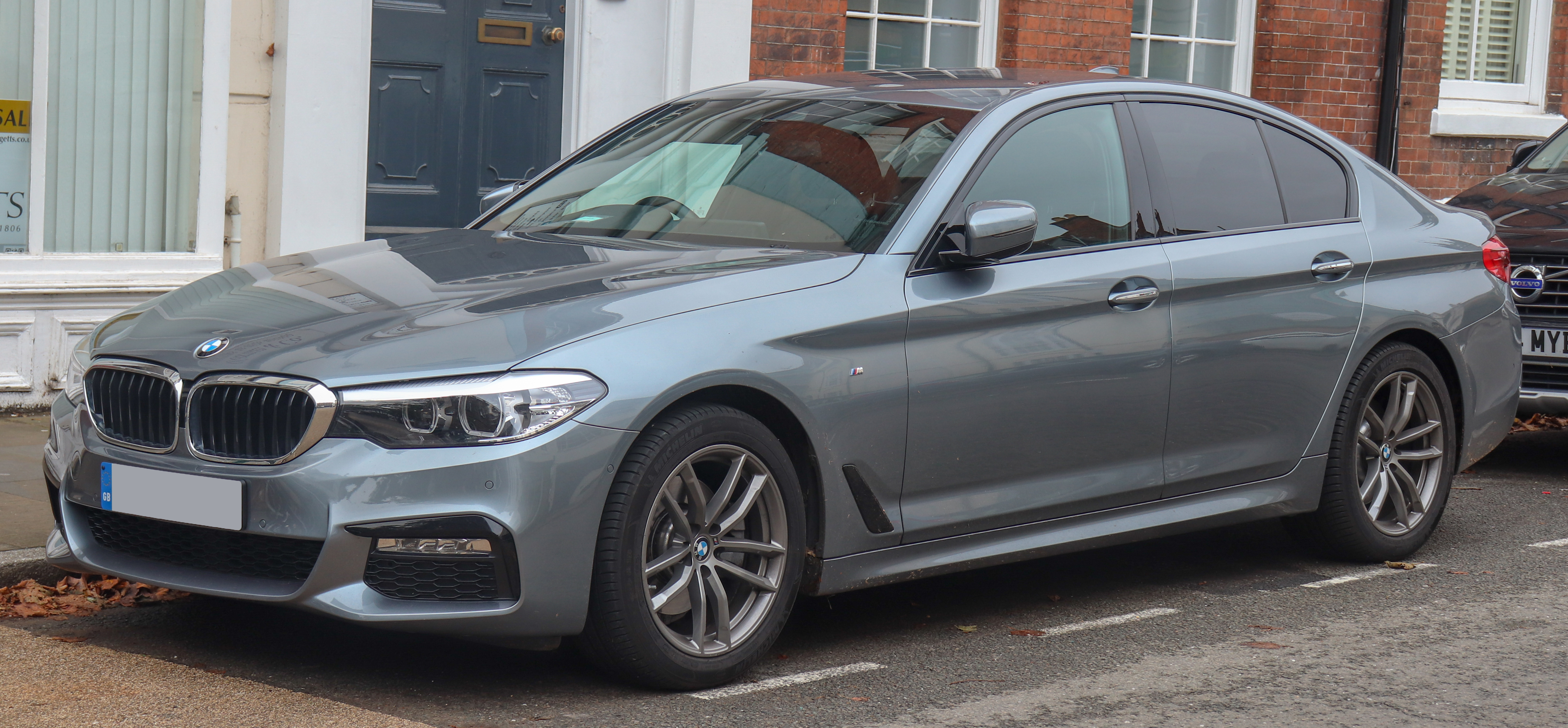
Inokom exports BMW cars to the Philippines.

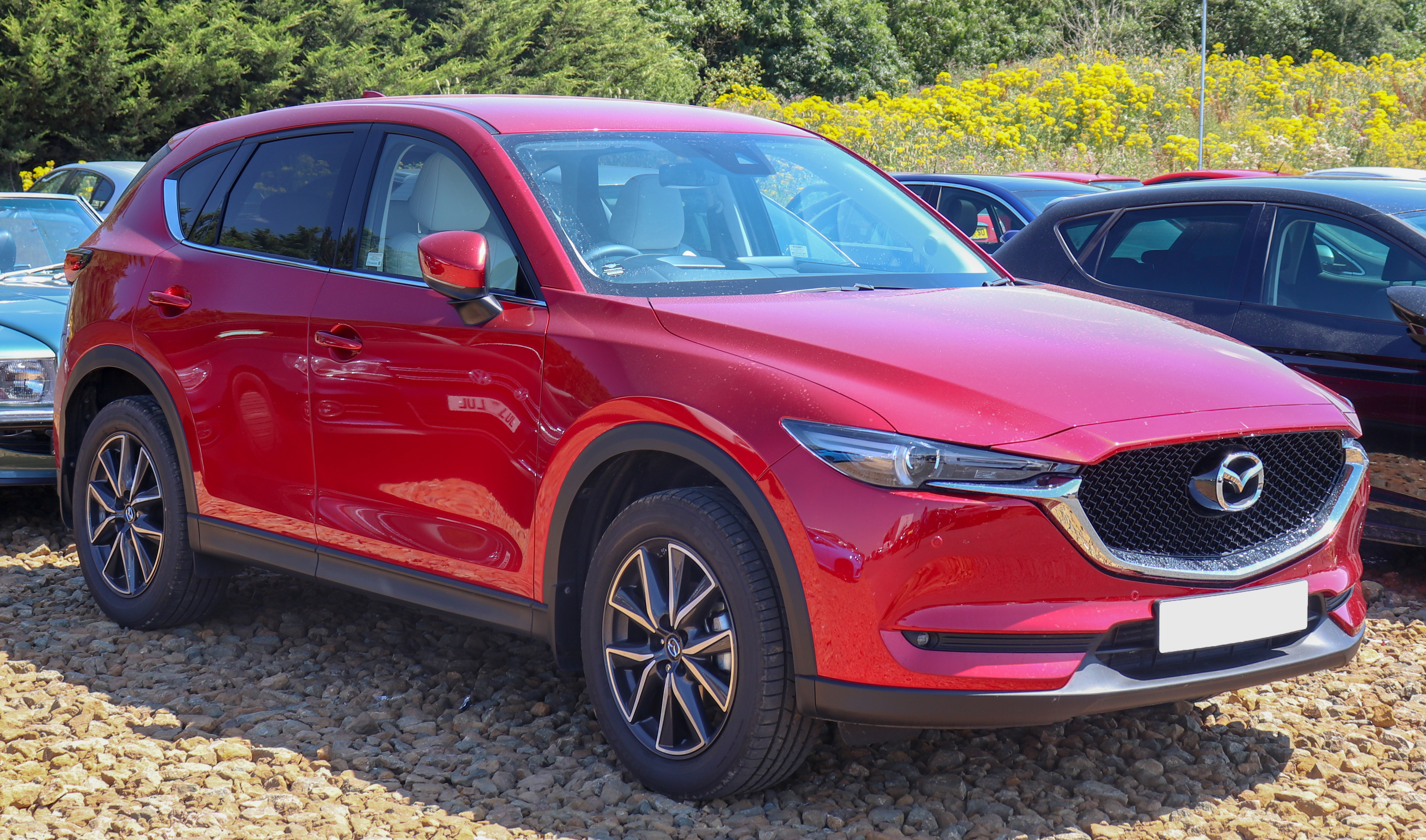
Inokom exports Mazda SUVs to Thailand.

Inokom's acquisition by Sime Darby also led to the assembly of BMW and Land Rover models at the Inokom plant in 2008. BMW and Land Rover vehicles were previously assembled at the Associated Motor Industries plant in Shah Alam. In 2018, local assembly of BMW engines commenced at a new engine assembly plant, while exports of Inokom-built BMWs commenced in 2019.

Mazda assembly at Inokom commenced in 2011 under a separate initiative by the Berjaya Group. Inokom has also carried out contract assembly for Dongfeng, Jinbei and Ford commercial vehicles.

=== Volvo Car Manufacturing Malaysia ===
Volvo Car Manufacturing Malaysia (VCMM) operates an assembly plant in Shah Alam with an annual capacity of 10,000 units. VCMM assembles Volvo passenger cars for both domestic and export markets. Volvo Car Manufacturing Malaysia is a wholly owned subsidiary of Sweden-based Volvo Car Corporation. The 50-year-old VCMM plant is the oldest automobile assembly plant in Malaysia, and is widely credited as one of the pioneers of the Malaysian automotive industry.

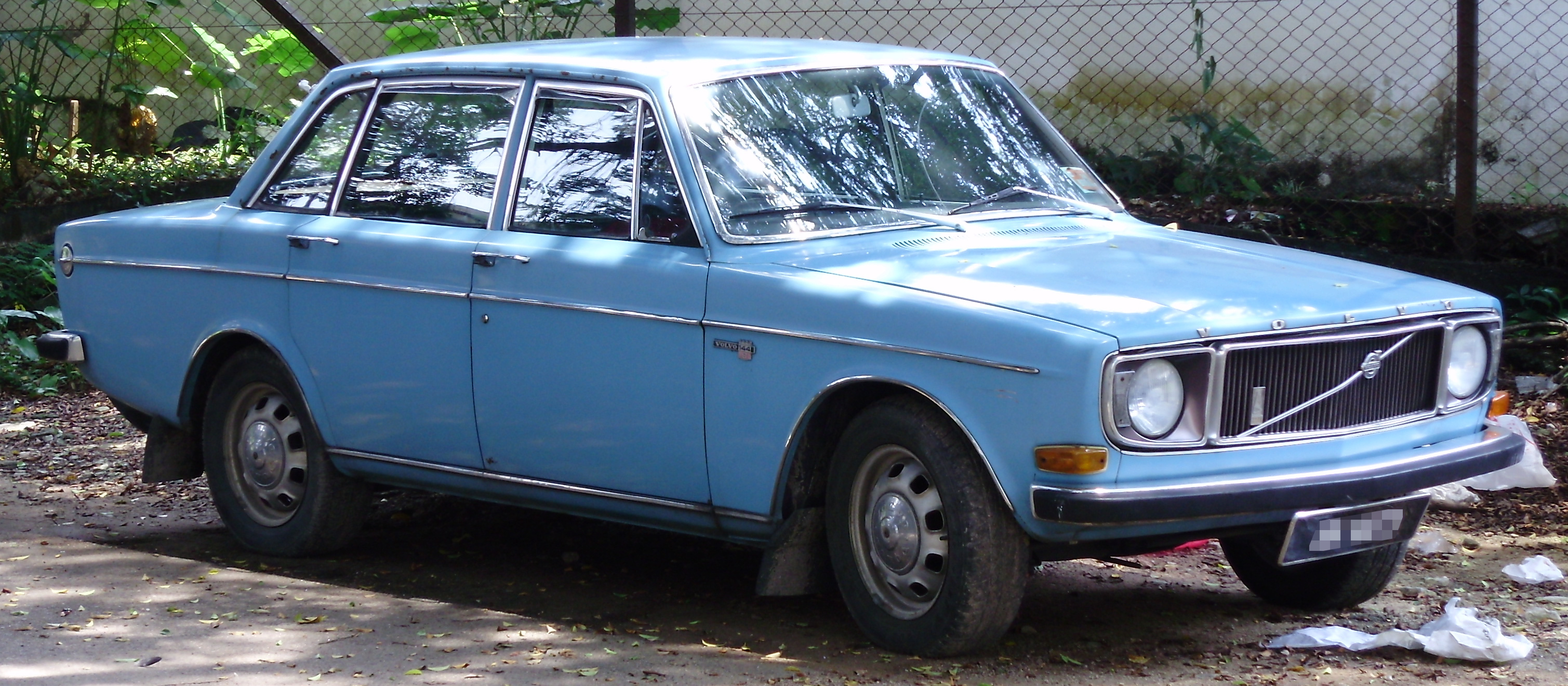
The Volvo 144 became the debut model for the Swedish Motor Assemblies plant.

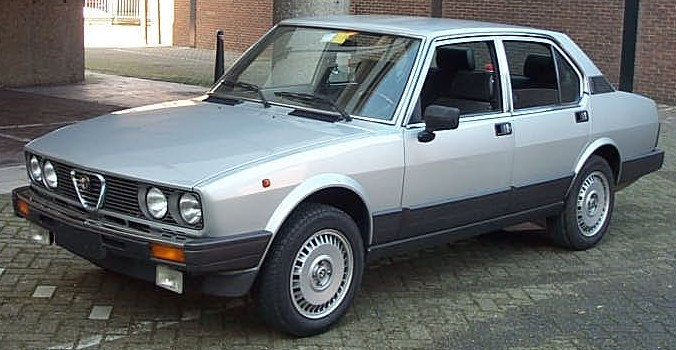
SMA carried out contract assembly for various car companies, such as Alfa Romeo.

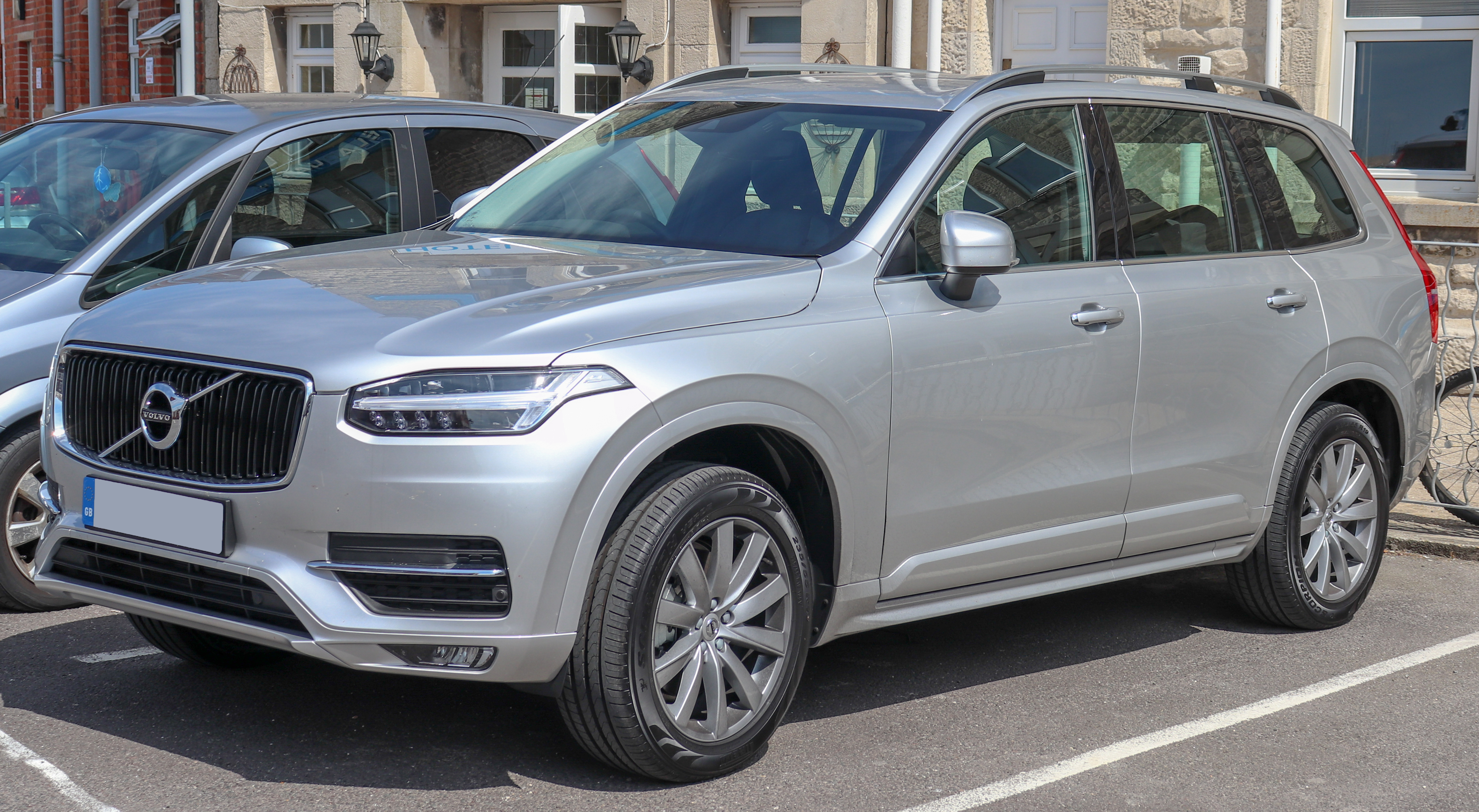
VCMM's export demand currently exceeds domestic sales.

The VCMM plant was established as Swedish Motor Assemblies (SMA) in September 1966 through a joint venture between AB Volvo and the Federal Auto Company Sdn. Bhd. Swedish Motor Assemblies was established in response to a government-proposed initiative to the set up an automotive industry in Malaysia. Construction of the SMA plant commenced in March 1967, and was completed in October 1967. The first Volvo 144 units rolled-off the assembly line in November 1967. By 1971, SMA had commenced assembly of Volvo trucks and buses.

Throughout its history, Swedish Motor Assemblies had assembled a wide variety of Volvo passenger and commercial vehicles. SMA had also conducted contract assembly operations for various car companies, including Datsun, Alfa Romeo, Daihatsu, Subaru, Suzuki, Renault, Land Rover, Mazda and Perodua among others. At times, SMA's production volume for non-Volvo cars vastly exceeded that of Volvo-badged cars.

However, by the beginning of the 2010s, contract assembly operations at the SMA plant had scaled down, as SMA consolidated operations to focus on Volvo production exclusively. By 2013, Swedish Motor Assemblies had changed its name to Volvo Car Manufacturing Malaysia, to better reflect its current identity.

The SMA plant historically catered to the Malaysian market, with intermittent low volume exports to neighbouring countries. In 2016, VCMM announced plans to facilitate exports to regional left-hand drive markets, and as of 2018, export demand had outpaced domestic sales. VCMM currently exports right-hand drive models to Thailand and Indonesia, and left-hand drive units to Taiwan, Vietnam, and the Philippines.

=== Assembly Services ===
Assembly Services Sdn. Bhd. (ASSB) currently operates two assembly plants with a combined annual capacity of 150,000 units. The original ASSB Shah Alam plant was built in 1968, and was later complemented by the all-new ASSB Bukit Raja plant in 2019. ASSB assembles Toyota passenger and commercial vehicles from imported complete knock down (CKD) kits. Assembly Services is a wholly owned subsidiary of UMW Toyota Motor Sdn. Bhd. (UMWT), which is in turn a subsidiary of UMW Holdings (51%), Toyota Motor Corporation (39%) and Toyota Tsusho Corporation (10%). Assembly Services was established in 1967 as Champion Motors (CM), then a subsidiary of the Inchcape group. Champion Motors was renamed Assembly Services in 1975, prior to its acquisition by UMW and Toyota in 1982. The original ASSB plant is among the oldest automobile assembly plants in Malaysia, and one of the few to surpass the 1 million cumulative production milestone.

Toyota's history in Malaysia can be traced back to the mid 1940s. During the Japanese occupation of Malaya, Toyoda (as Toyota was then known) military trucks were among those produced at the occupied Ford Malaya plant in Singapore. After the war, Toyota returned to Malaysia in the late 1950s, and the sales and reputation of Toyota vehicles grew over course of the 1960s. However, the Toyota brand franchise in Malaysia was constantly beset with obstacles and problems, and the franchise would change hands multiple times before settling with its current owner, the UMW group.

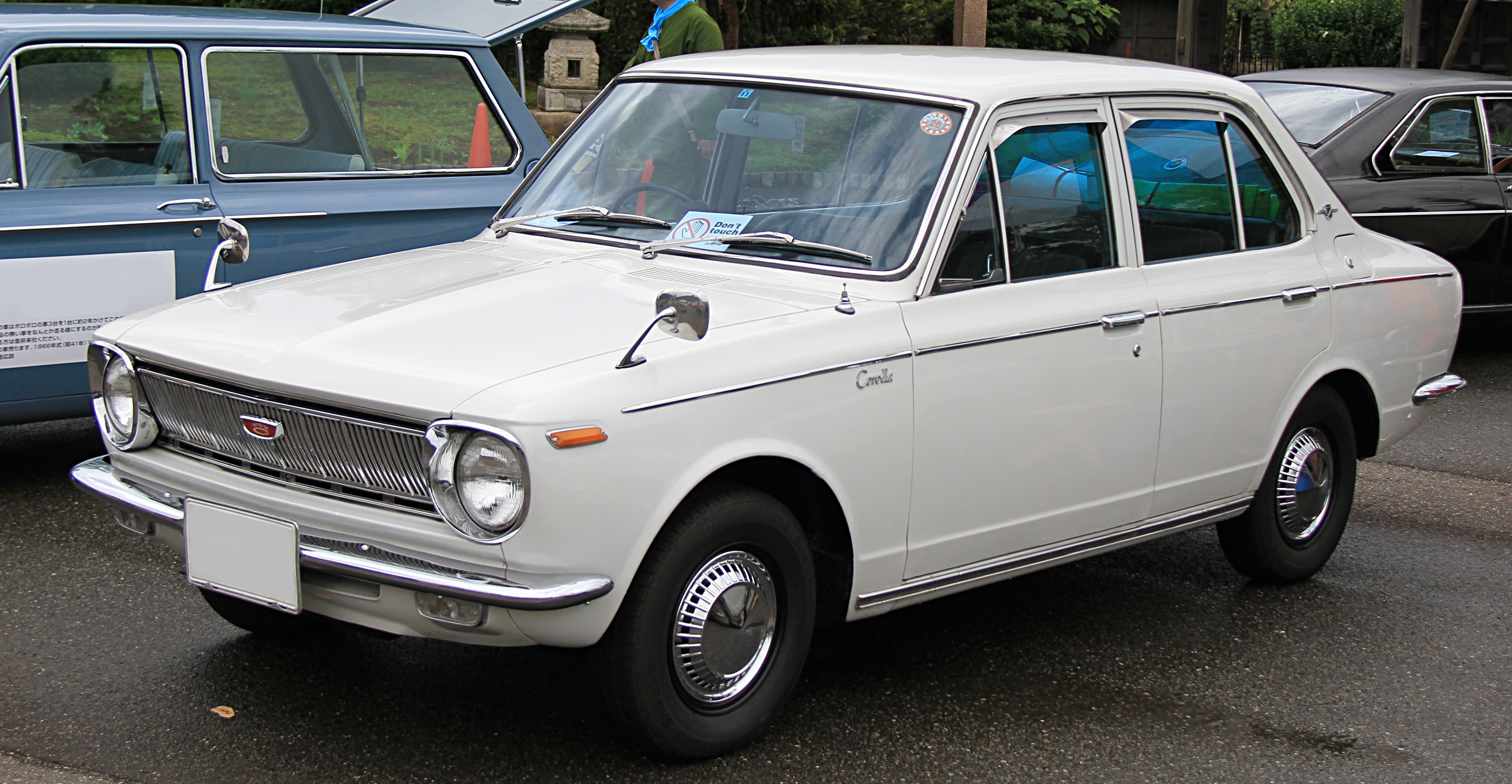
The first generation Corolla became the first Toyota model to be assembled in Malaysia.

Toyota's first appointed Malaysian distributor was the Asia Motor Company, founded by the Ph'ng family from Penang. Asia Motor imported the Toyota Land Cruiser (FJ25) into Malaya in August 1957, as well as the Toyota Truck (FA70) the following year. However, Asia Motor's contract soon expired, and in September 1960, Toyota signed a new distributor agreement with Kah Motor, a wholly owned subsidiary of Penang-based Oriental Holdings, chaired by Loh Boon Siew. Kah Motor imported Toyota and Toyopet passenger cars such as the Tiara and Publica for sale in Malaya and Singapore. In December 1963, Kah Motor and Toyota announced plans for a Toyota assembly plant in Butterworth, in response to the Malaysian government's proposal to set up a domestic automotive industry.

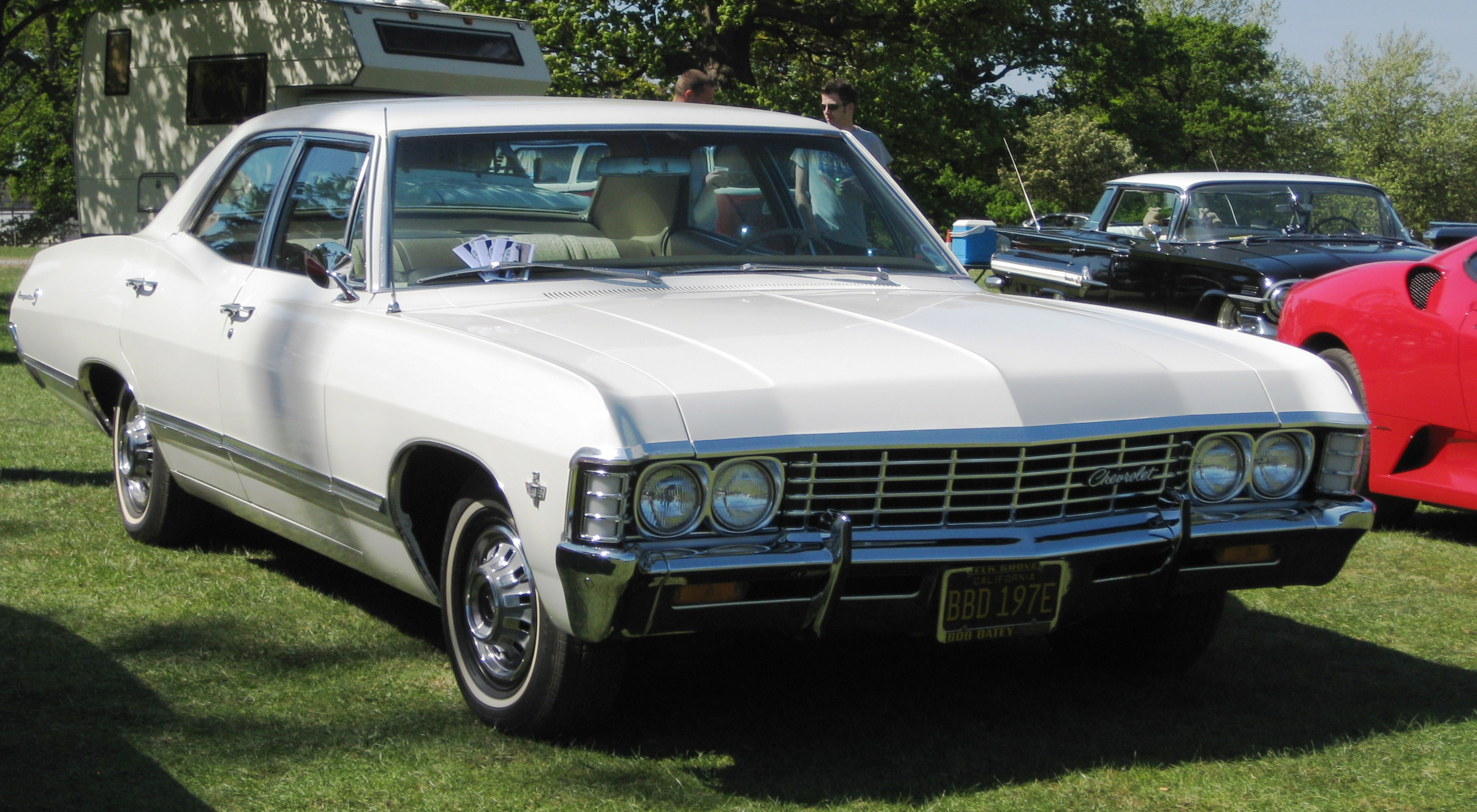
Champion Motors assembled a wide variety of vehicles, including the Chevrolet Impala.

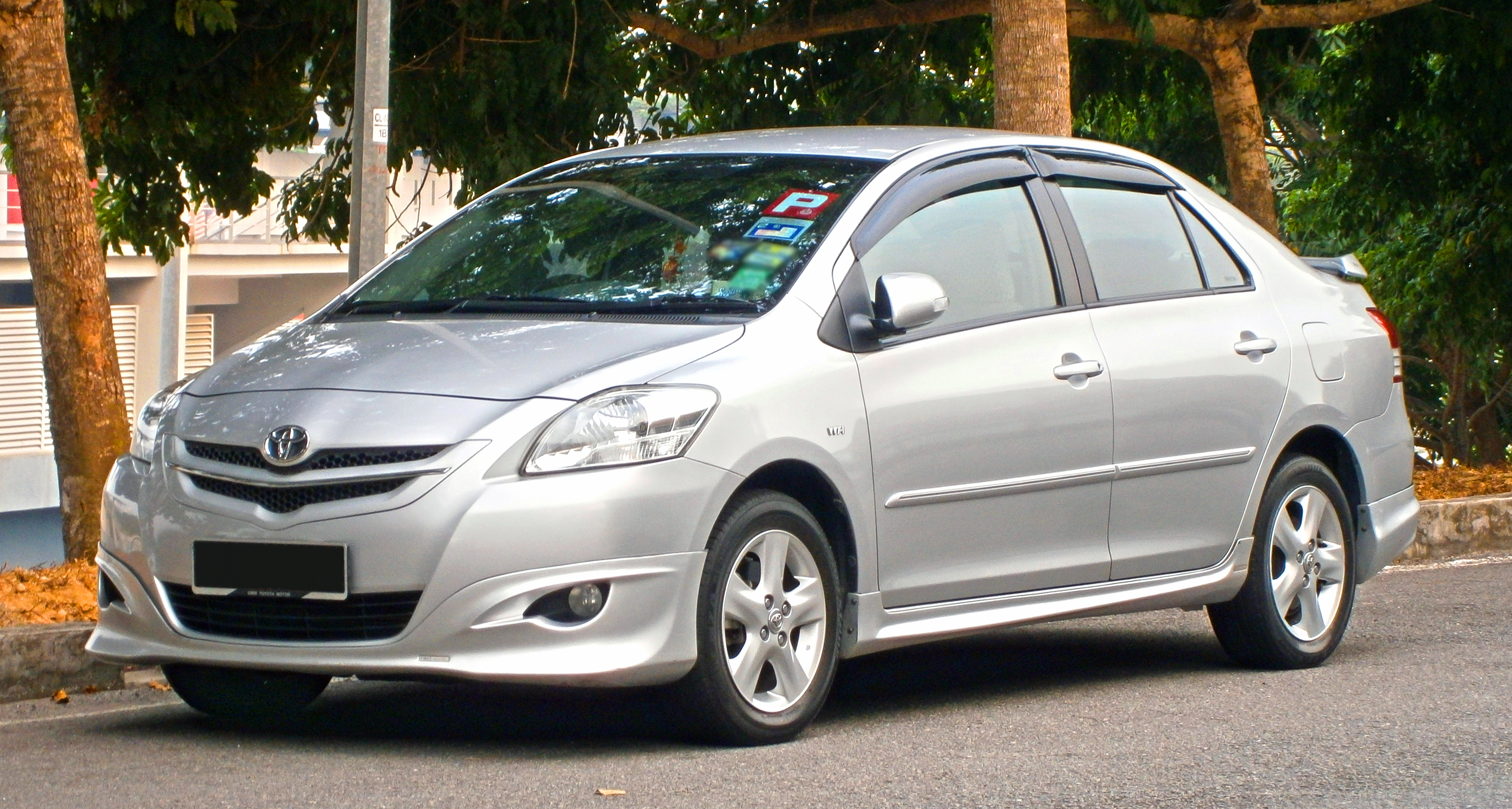
ASSB produced its 1,000,000th vehicle in April 2011.

However, various complications occurred in the following years, and in 1967, Toyota signed a separate distributor agreement with Borneo Motors, a subsidiary of London-based Inchcape. That same year, Borneo Motors' sister company, Motor Investments (MIB) commenced construction of the Champion Motors (CM) assembly plant in Shah Alam. In February 1968, the first Malaysian-assembled Toyota models rolled out of the Champion Motors plant. In addition to Toyota models, Champion Motors also assembled Volkswagen, Vauxhall, Chevrolet and Mercedes-Benz models in its initial years of operations. Although not an official Toyota plant, Champion Motors benefited significantly from Japanese technology transfer by adopting the Toyota Production System. By the 1970s, Toyota models had accounted for the largest share of Champion Motors' production. In July 1975, Champion Motors was renamed Assembly Services (ASSB). Apart from Borneo Motors, Toyota had also granted the franchise rights for Toyota commercial vehicles (Hilux and Land Cruiser) to other Malaysian companies such as Emastorin Motor and Sarin Motor, the latter of which oversaw Land Cruiser assembly at the Sarawak Motor Industries (SMI) plant for the East Malaysian market.

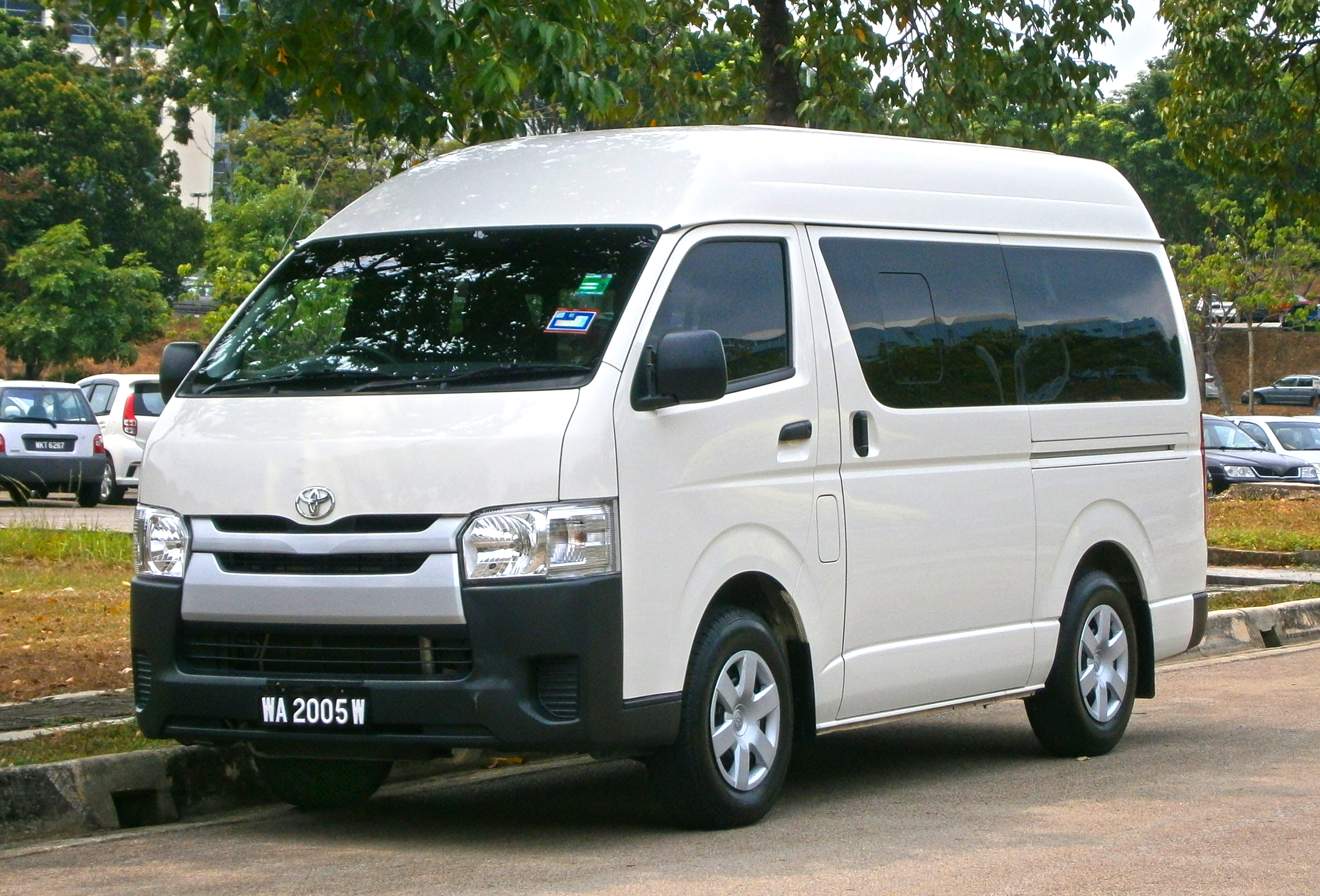
ASSB produces the HiAce for both Malaysia and Thailand.

By the dawn of the 1980s, various complications had brought about yet another franchise transition. In 1981, negotiations between Toyota and United Motor Works (UMW), led by Eric Chia culminated in UMW's appointment as the new Toyota franchise holder in Malaysia. The following year, UMW, through its subsidiary Sejati Motor acquired the Assembly Services plant and Borneo Motors network from Inchcape. By 1983, Toyota operations in both West and East Malaysia were unified, and in 1987, Sejati Motor was renamed UMW Toyota Motor (UMWT). The UMW group has held the Toyota franchise ever since.

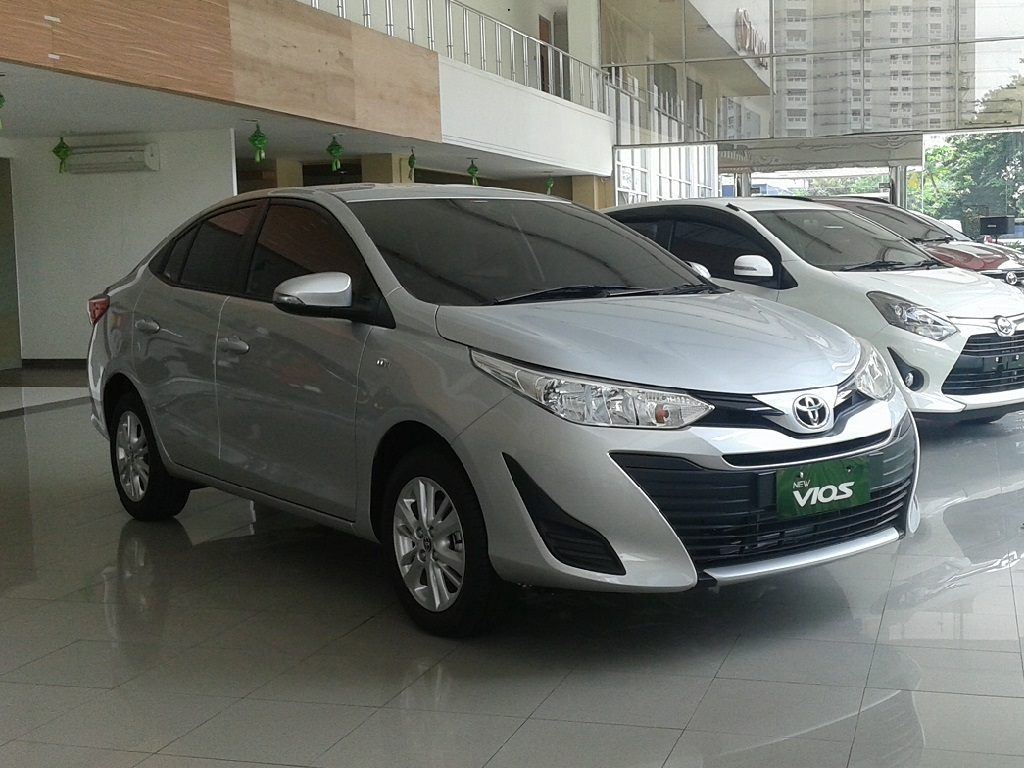
UMW Toyota's second plant commenced operations in 2019.

The Assembly Services plant is further supplemented by sister companies of UMW Toyota, most notably Automotive Industries (AISB) and Toyota Boshoku UMW (TBU) which manufacture exhaust systems and interior components respectively. UMW Toyota subsidiaries also supply components to non-Toyota plants in Malaysia and abroad. Additionally, Toyota is the sole foreign car company to carry out body panel stamping operations for select Malaysian-built models through its subsidiary, Toyota Auto Body Malaysia (TABM). In 2016, UMW and Toyota announced plans for a second Toyota assembly plant in Bukit Raja, with a capital investment of RM2 billion. Construction of the second plant was completed in late 2018, and operations commenced in January 2019 with the debut of the revised third generation Vios.

=== Go Automobile Manufacturing ===
Go Automobile Manufacturing Sdn. Bhd. (GAM) currently operates an assembly plant in Gurun with an annual capacity of 25,000 units. GAM assembles Haval and Great Wall Motors (GWM) vehicles for both domestic and export markets. Go Automobile Manufacturing is a subsidiary of Malaysia-based Go Auto Group of Companies. Go Auto is the appointed distributor, assembler and exporter of Haval and Great Wall Motors vehicles for the ASEAN region.

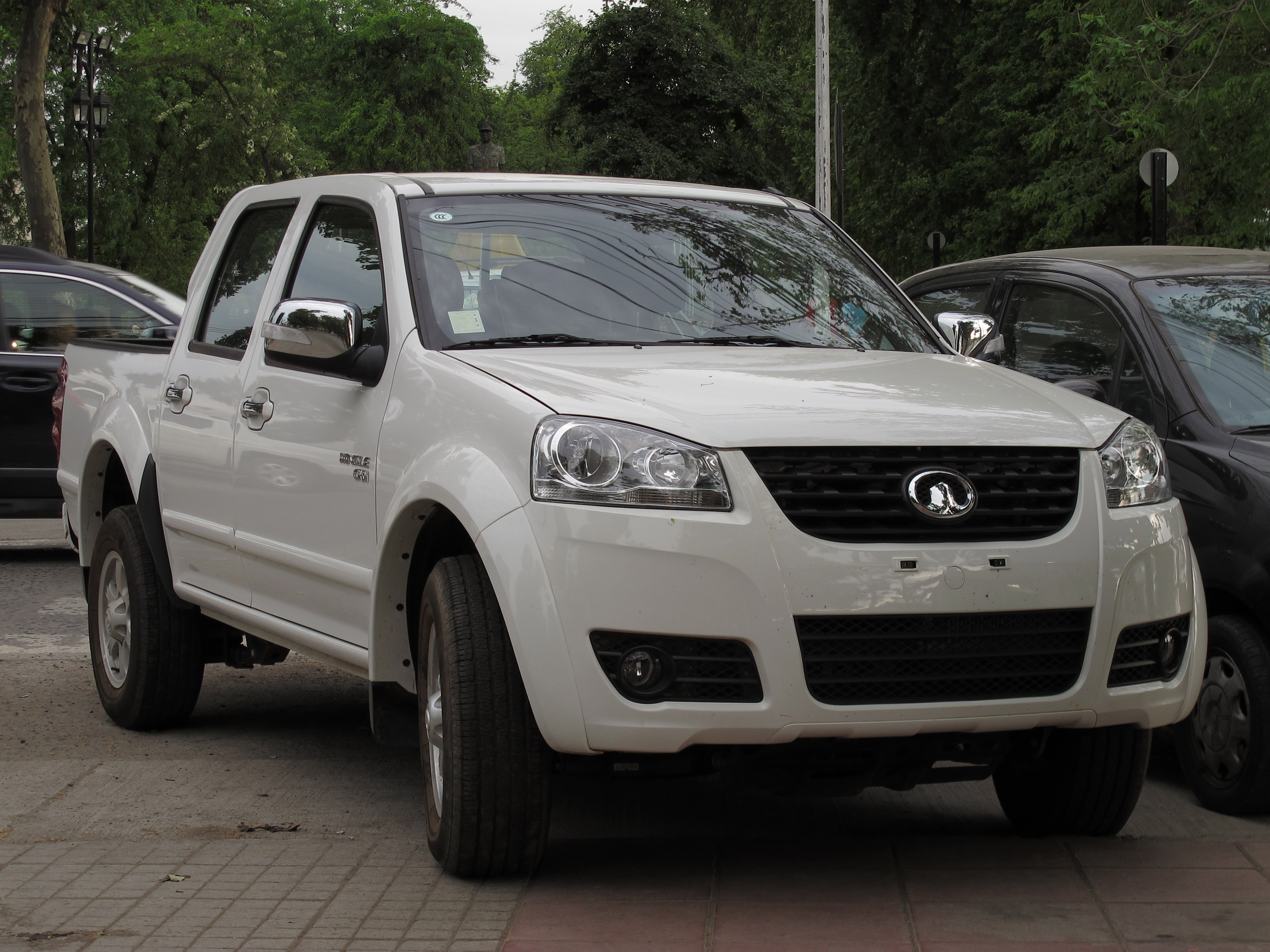
The Wingle 5 pickup truck became the first Great Wall model to be assembled in Malaysia.

The Go Auto plant was established in the late 2000s by MAZS Sdn. Bhd., a subsidiary of Green Oranges Sdn. Bhd. (GOSB). In mid 2011, Green Oranges imported the first Great Wall vehicles into Malaysia, and local assembly operations commenced later that year. In April 2014, Go Auto became the first company to be awarded with an Energy Efficient Vehicle (EEV) manufacturing license from MITI. The Green Oranges plant was subsequently developed into Go Automobile Manufacturing, and further investments into a second, adjacent facility increased production capacity from 10,000 units annually to 25,000 units by 2015. The Go Auto plant is located across the street from the Naza Automotive Manufacturing plant.

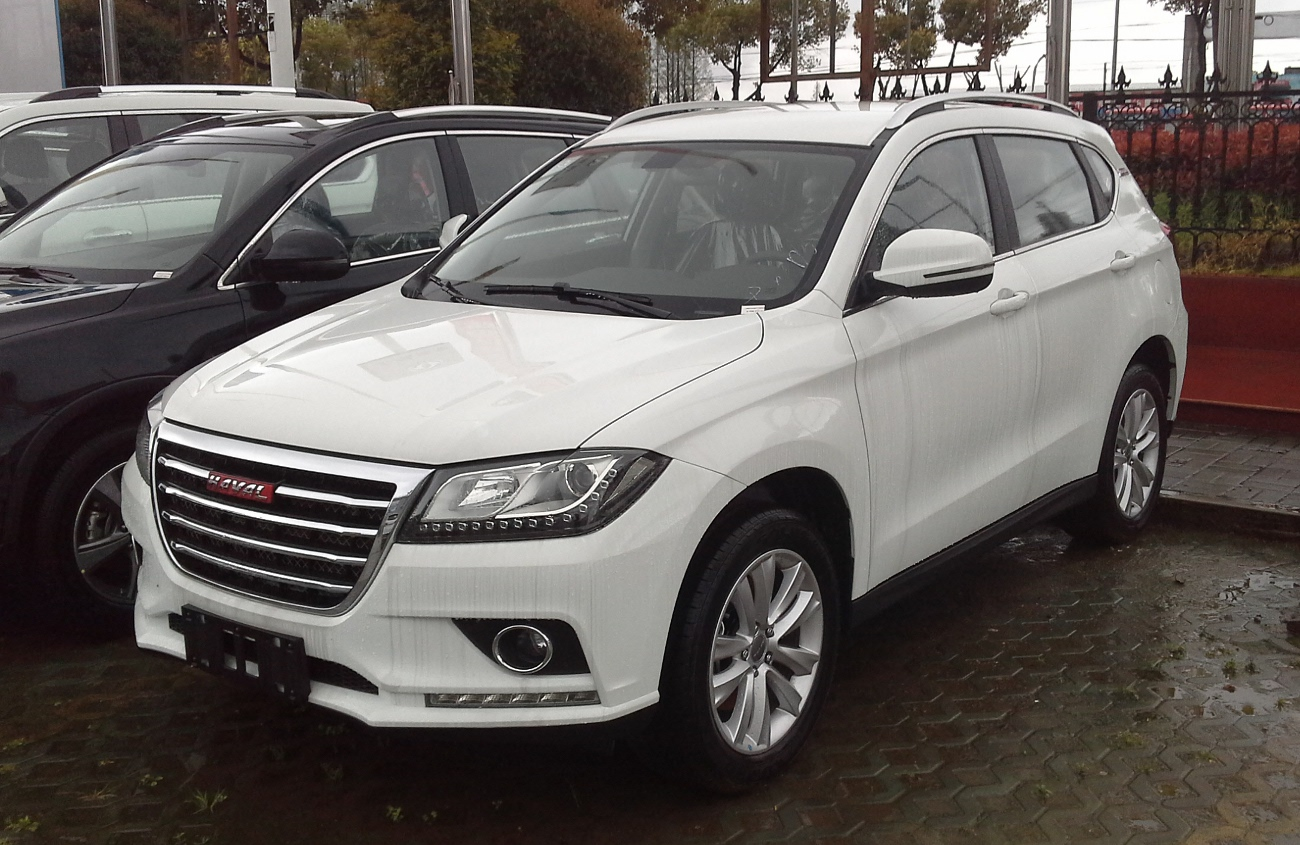
Malaysia is Haval's production hub in Southeast Asia.

The Go Auto plant employs a unique 'factory-in-factory' or 'Tier 0' approach, in which component suppliers or vendors are invited to directly participate in automobile assembly by setting up smaller factories within the larger plant itself. Each vendor concentrates and specialises on a specific section of the assembly line, while Go Auto supervises the overall assembly process. All vendors co-ordinate and co-operate with each other to solve problems and achieve high quality control standards. The 'Tier 0' system aims to develop and enhance local vendor capabilities.

In addition to Great Wall and Haval vehicles, Go Auto has also carried out contract assembly for Hafei, BAIC, Jinbei and Dongfeng commercial vehicles in recent years. Go Auto has exported Haval SUVs to Thailand, Brunei, Indonesia and Cambodia. The company has expressed plans to widen exports to additional ASEAN countries in the near future.

=== HICOM Automotive Manufacturers (Malaysia) ===
HICOM Automotive Manufacturers (Malaysia) Sdn. Bhd. (HA) currently operates two main assembly plants in Pekan, which collectively encompass several smaller sub-plants and facilities. HA is part of the DRB-HICOM Pekan automotive complex, which is among the nation's largest automobile production hubs. The entire automotive complex is divided by a section of the Federal Route 3 highway, which separates HA Plant 1 to the West, from HA Plant 2 to the East. Plant 1 hosts the Volkswagen Pekan Plant (VPP), which produces Volkswagen passenger vehicles, and the Suzuki Malaysia Automobile plant, which is currently idle. Plant 2 hosts the Mercedes-Benz Malaysia (MBM) plant, which produces Mercedes-Benz passenger and commercial vehicles, in addition to Mitsubishi Fuso commercial vehicles. All three sub-plants assemble vehicles from imported knock down kits. Additionally, the DRB-HICOM Defence Technologies (DefTech) facility and Isuzu HICOM Malaysia (IHM) plant are both located in close proximity to Plant 1 and 2. DefTech and IHM are not part of HICOM Automotive Manufacturers (Malaysia), but DefTech is nonetheless a subsidiary of DRB-HICOM, while IHM is a 51:49 joint venture between Isuzu and HICOM. The Pekan automotive complex has produced a diverse variety of vehicles over the course of its history, with models from over 20 different car companies, both domestic and foreign badged.

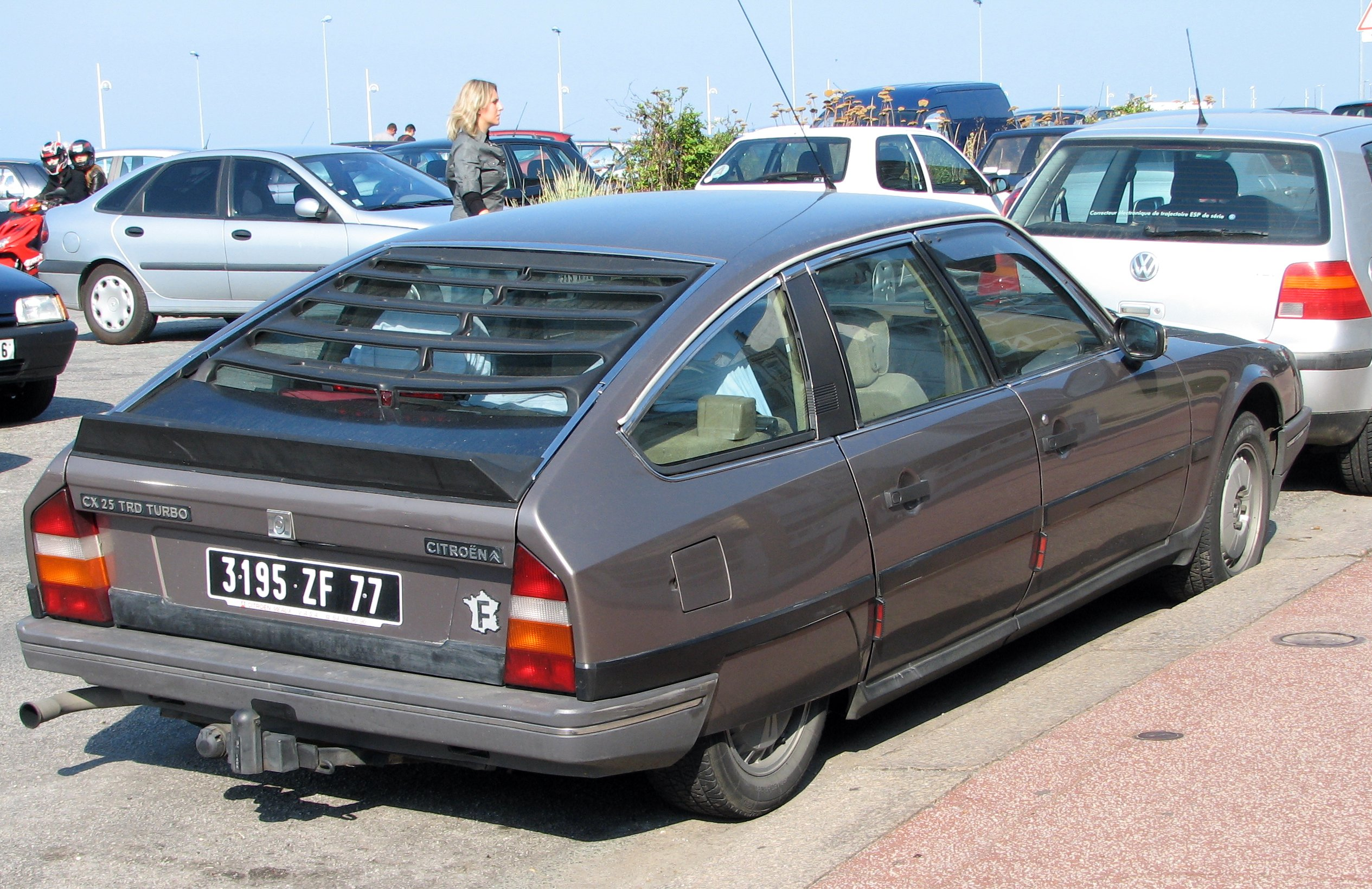
AMM assembled several Citroën models, including the CX.

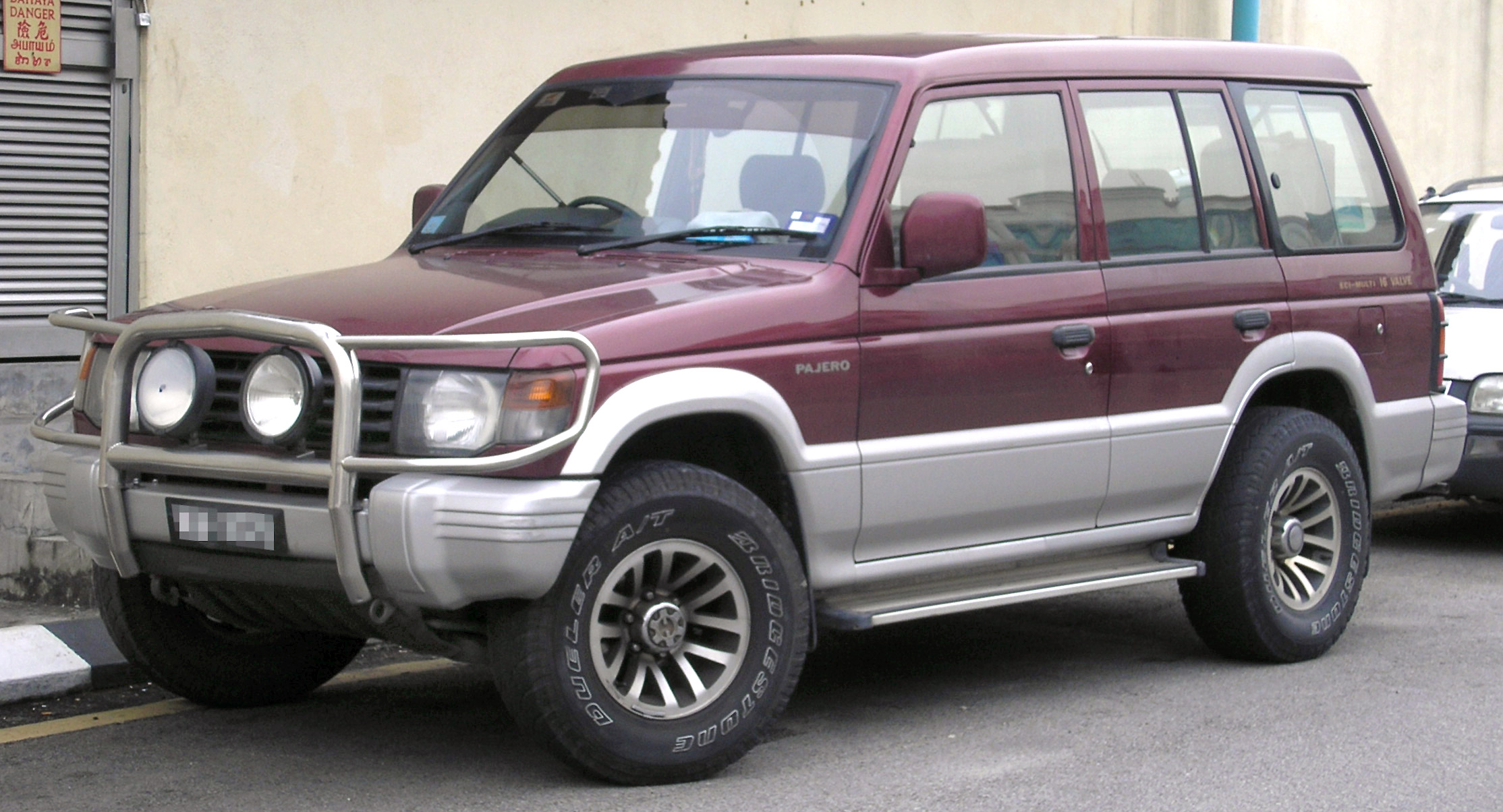
The Pajero was one of several Mitsubishi vehicles assembled by AMM.

HICOM Automotive Manufacturers (Malaysia) traces its origins to the mid 1970s, when the TATAB Industries Assembly Plant (TIAP) was established under a 70:30 joint venture between Pahang-based TAB group and Tata of India. The development of the TIAP plant was partially funded by the Pahang royal family, and upon its completion in 1976, it became the first automobile assembly plant in the East Coast region. In the late 1970s and early 1980s, TIAP produced Tata commercial vehicles, but in 1983, the Master Carriage group, an affiliate company of Diversified Resources Berhad (DRB) bought the TIAP facility, and renamed it Automotive Manufacturers (Malaysia) Sdn. Bhd. (AMM). Over the course of the mid 1980s and early 1990s, the AMM plant would take on contract assembly for Isuzu, Suzuki and Mitsubishi commercial vehicles, as well as Citroën passenger vehicles.

By late 1994, the AMM complex had grown to accommodate 8 separate assembly lines. In July 1995, AMM commenced operations at a second assembly plant, AMM 2, on the eastern bank of the Federal Route 3 highway at the Peramu Jaya industrial estate. AMM 2 was tasked with the assembly of commercial vehicles exclusively, while the original plant on the western bank, AMM 1, would specialise in passenger car assembly. The combined annual production capacity of the AMM complex stood at around 80,000 units in late 1995.

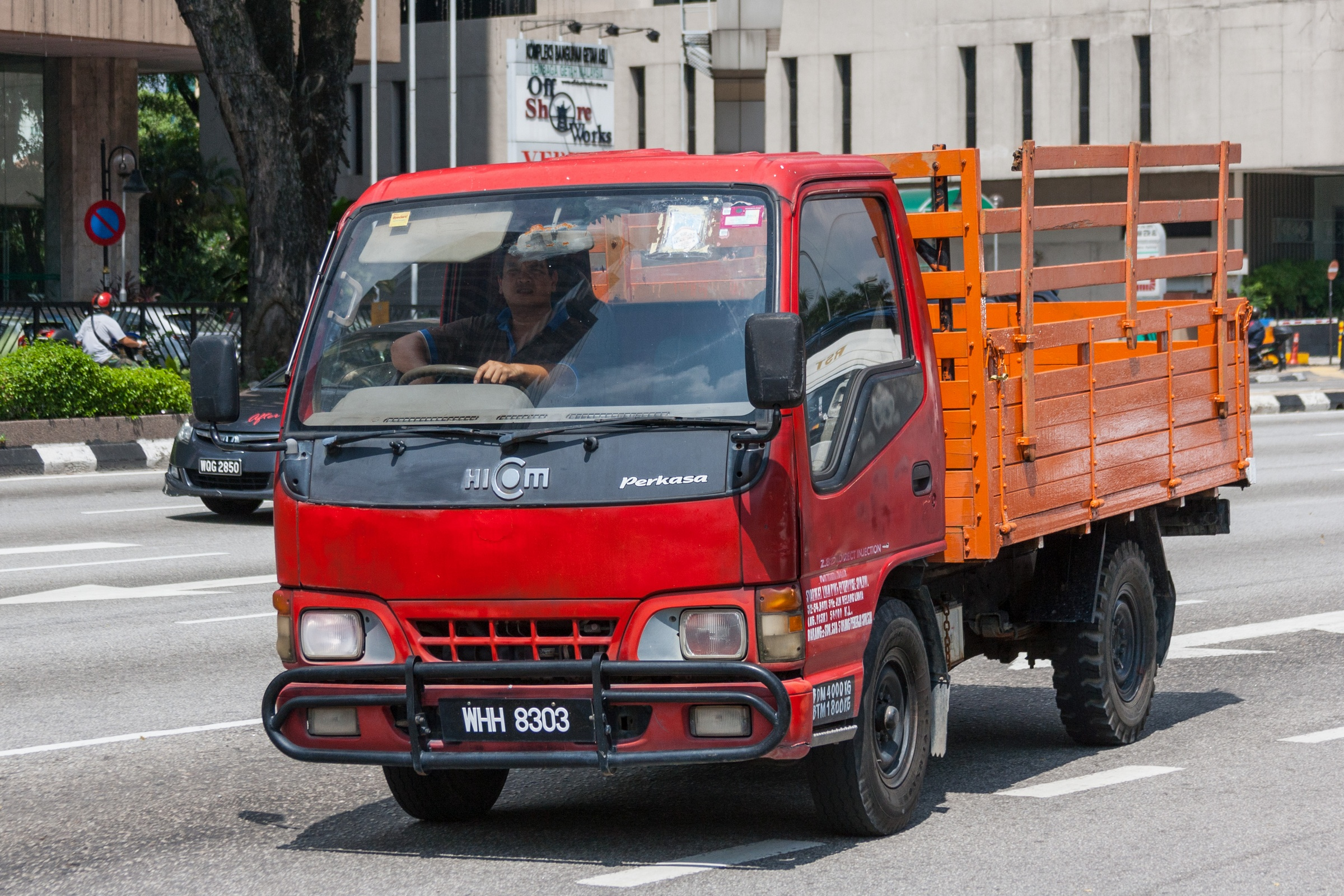
The HICOM Perkasa.

In the mid 1990s, AMM became one of two plants to participate in the National Commercial Vehicle (NCV) project, when HICOM Commercial Vehicles was established in January 1994 under a 40:40:20 joint venture between DRB, HICOM and Isuzu. By 1996, HICOM Commercial Vehicles had been renamed Malaysian Truck & Bus (MTB), while DRB and HICOM had merged. MTB had acquired the AMM 2 plant for the NCV project, and plans for a HICOM-badged, Isuzu-based, AMM-built trucks were unveiled. In July 1997, the HICOM Perkasa was launched as the first product from the MTB joint venture. The Perkasa is based on the fifth-generation Isuzu Elf, and it was produced in both narrow-cab, short wheelbase and wide-cab, long wheelbase configurations. Isuzu vehicles have also formed the basis for other HICOM-badged vehicles, most notably the DefTech-built HICOM Handalan series. In 2007, Isuzu acquired a 51% majority stake in MTB, and the company was subsequently renamed Isuzu HICOM Malaysia.

Aside from the joint venture with Isuzu, AMM had also hosted a second concurrent partnership with national car company Proton. In June 1994, Usahasama Proton-DRB (USPD) was established under 51:30:19 joint venture between DRB, Proton and Erat Bakti. USPD was established to market niche or non-mainstream Proton models, as a complement to HICOM-directed Edaran Otomobil Nasional (EON), which concentrated on mainstream Proton models. By November 1994, production of the Proton Satria had commenced on a dedicated assembly line at the AMM complex. By 1996, AMM had been granted an export certificate from Britain's Vehicle Certification Agency, and through its alliance with Proton, AMM became one of the few domestic plants to have ever exported cars to the United Kingdom.

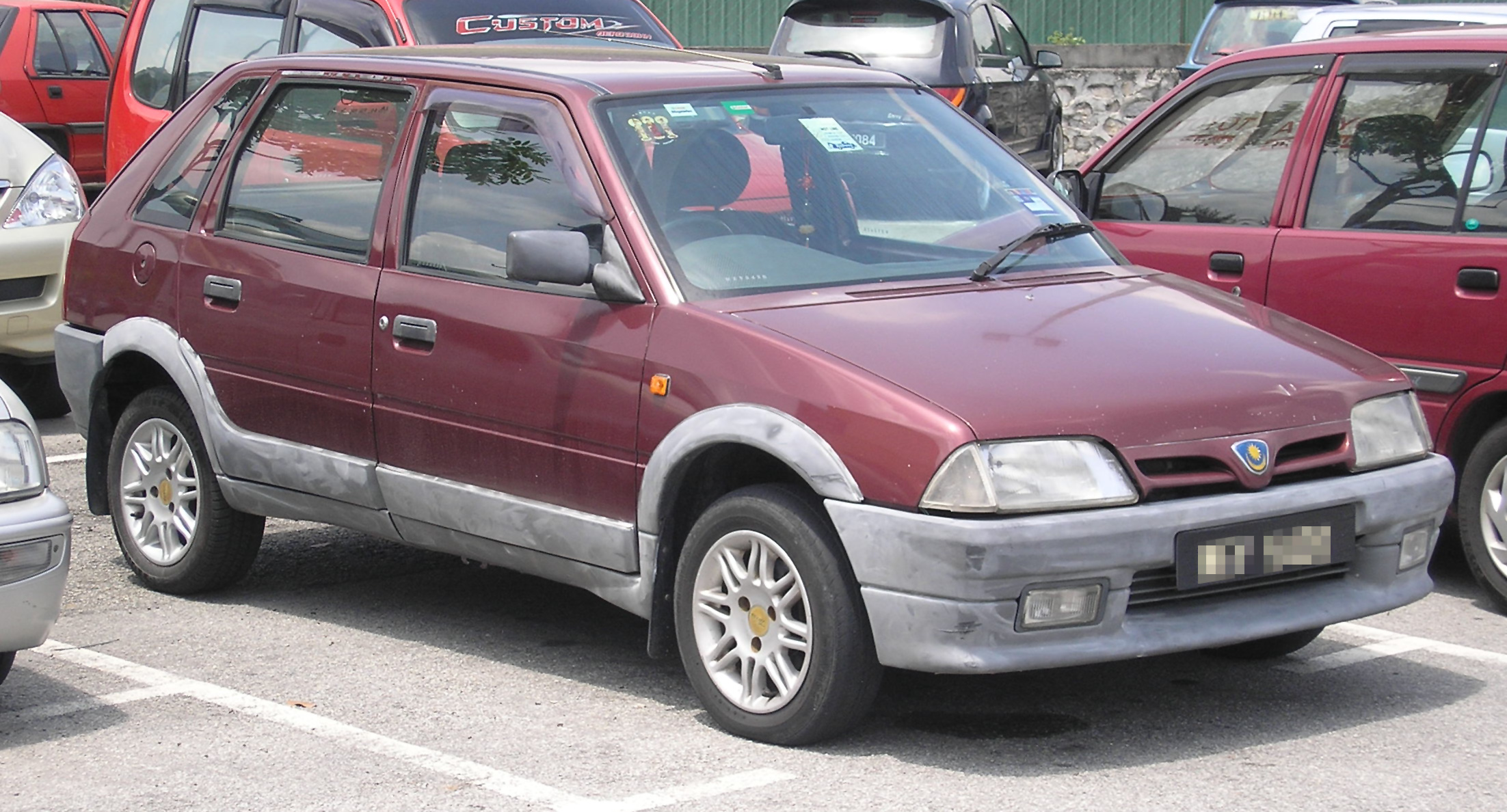
Several Proton models were produced at the AMM plant.

By 1995, DRB's relationship with Citroen and Proton had converged into a tripartite joint venture by way of a Proton-badged, Citroen-based, AMM-built model. The first and only model from the joint venture, the Proton Tiara, was launched in April 1996. Further plans were made for a second, Saxo-based model, and DRB had invested in additional plant capacity to accommodate future exports. However, the three-way joint venture suffered multiple complications and setbacks, including the loss of then HICOM chairman Yahaya Ahmad in 1997, and the subsequent Asian financial crisis. Production of the Tiara ceased in late 1999, but AMM continued to produce other Mitsubishi-based, Proton-badged vehicles up to the mid 2000s. By late 2000, Proton had fully acquired USPD, and the company was subsequently renamed Proton Edar.

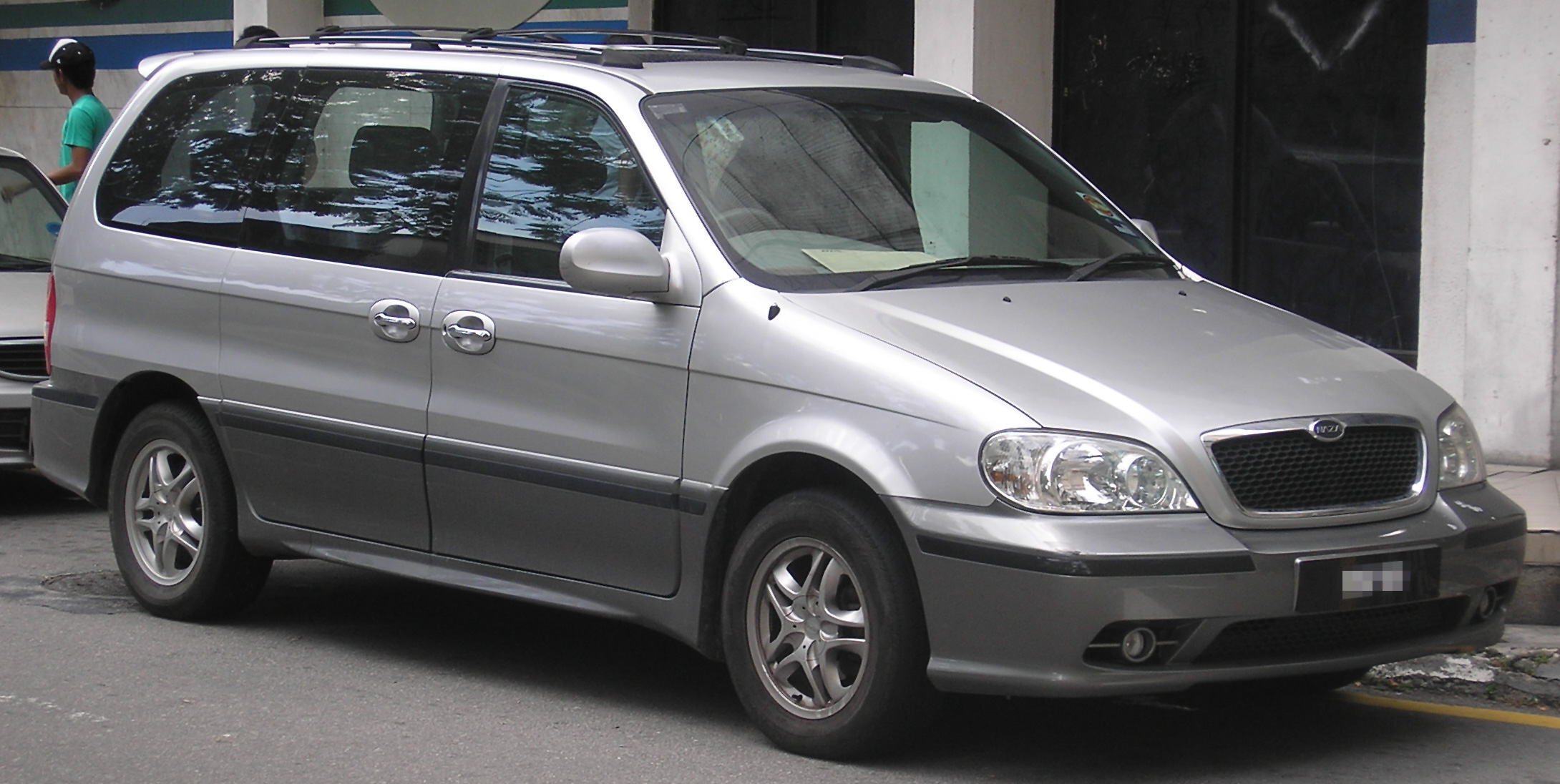
AMM briefly produced Kia and Naza models under contract.

By the dawn of the 2000s, AMM had taken on contract assembly for additional companies. In October 2001, AMM entered into a contract assembly agreement with Naza, the appointed Kia Motors franchise holder in Malaysia. Naza had sought to temporarily utilise AMM's facilities while construction of their own plant in Gurun took place. Under the agreement with Naza, the AMM plant produced the Kia Spectra, Pregio and K2700, as well as Naza-badged vehicles such as the Ria and Sutera up to the mid 2000s. By the 2010s, assembly of Kia and Naza vehicles had been fully relocated to the Naza Automotive Manufacturing plant. The AMM plant had also assembled SsangYong vehicles under another contract agreement with Competitive Supreme (CSSB).

By the mid 2000s, the Pekan automotive complex had taken on assembly of Mercedes-Benz vehicles through a joint venture between DaimlerChrysler Malaysia (DCM) and Malaysian Truck & Bus (MTB). DaimlerChrysler Malaysia was a 51:49 joint venture between DaimlerChrysler AG, which owned Mercedes-Benz, and Cycle & Carriage Bintang (CCB), the long-standing Mercedes-Benz franchise holder in Malaysia. Prior to the MTB and DCM joint venture, Mercedes-Benz vehicles were assembled concurrently at two different plants, namely Asia Automobile Industries in Petaling Jaya and Oriental Assemblers in Tampoi. To better coordinate logistics and quality control, Mercedes-Benz had sought to consolidate their Malaysian assembly operations at a single plant. Thus, in May 2004, Mercedes-Benz approached MTB through its subsidiary, DCM, and plans were made to shift Malaysian assembly of future Mercedes-Benz vehicles to the MTB plant. DCM did not acquire an equity stake in MTB, but it was nonetheless allowed to operate autonomously, as Mercedes-Benz vehicles would be assembled on dedicated assembly lines, and only the paint shops would be shared with other companies at MTB and AMM.

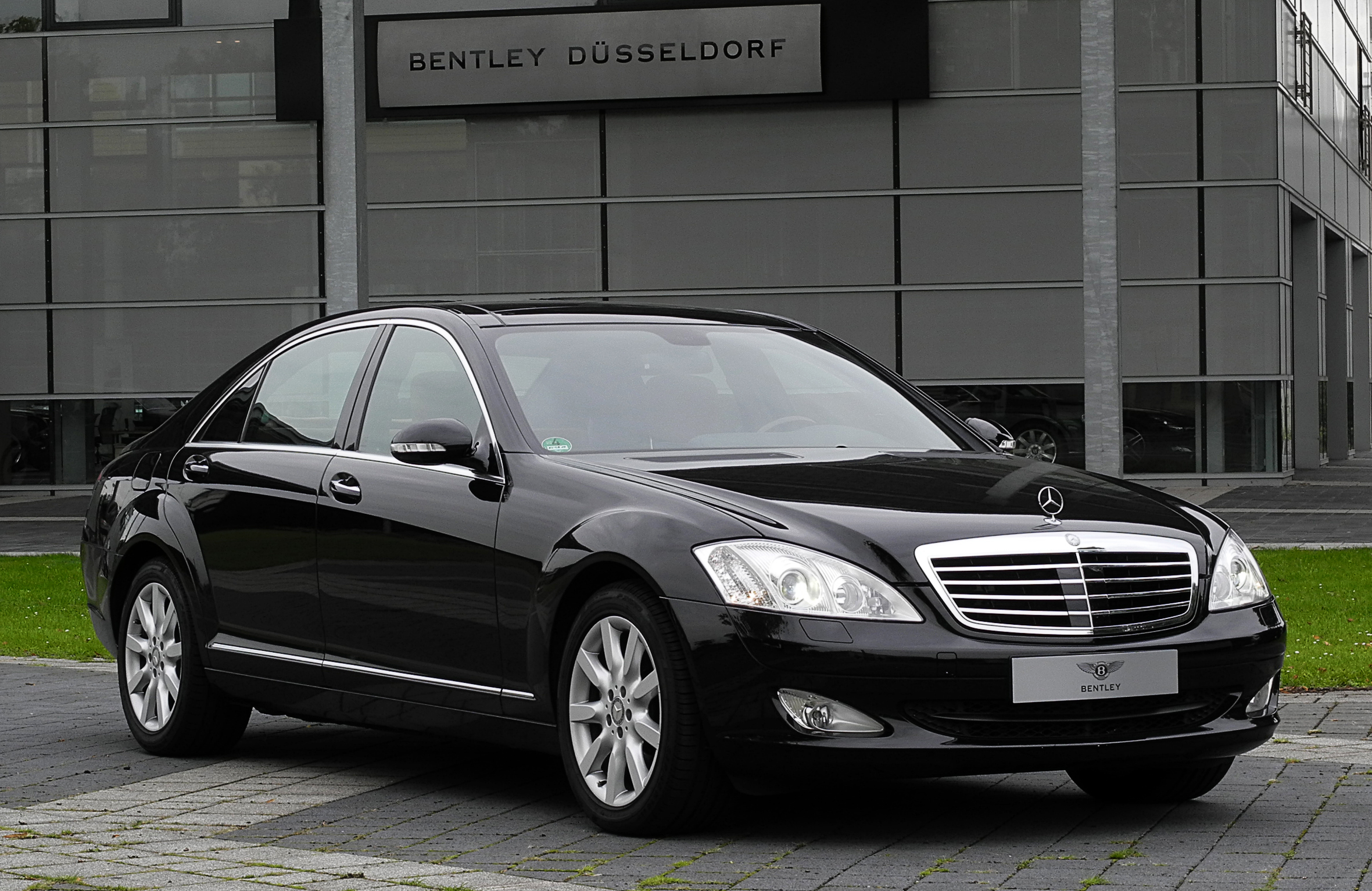
The Mercedes-Benz V221 S500L is the most expensive car ever to be assembled in Malaysia. It cost 1 million ringgit in 2008.

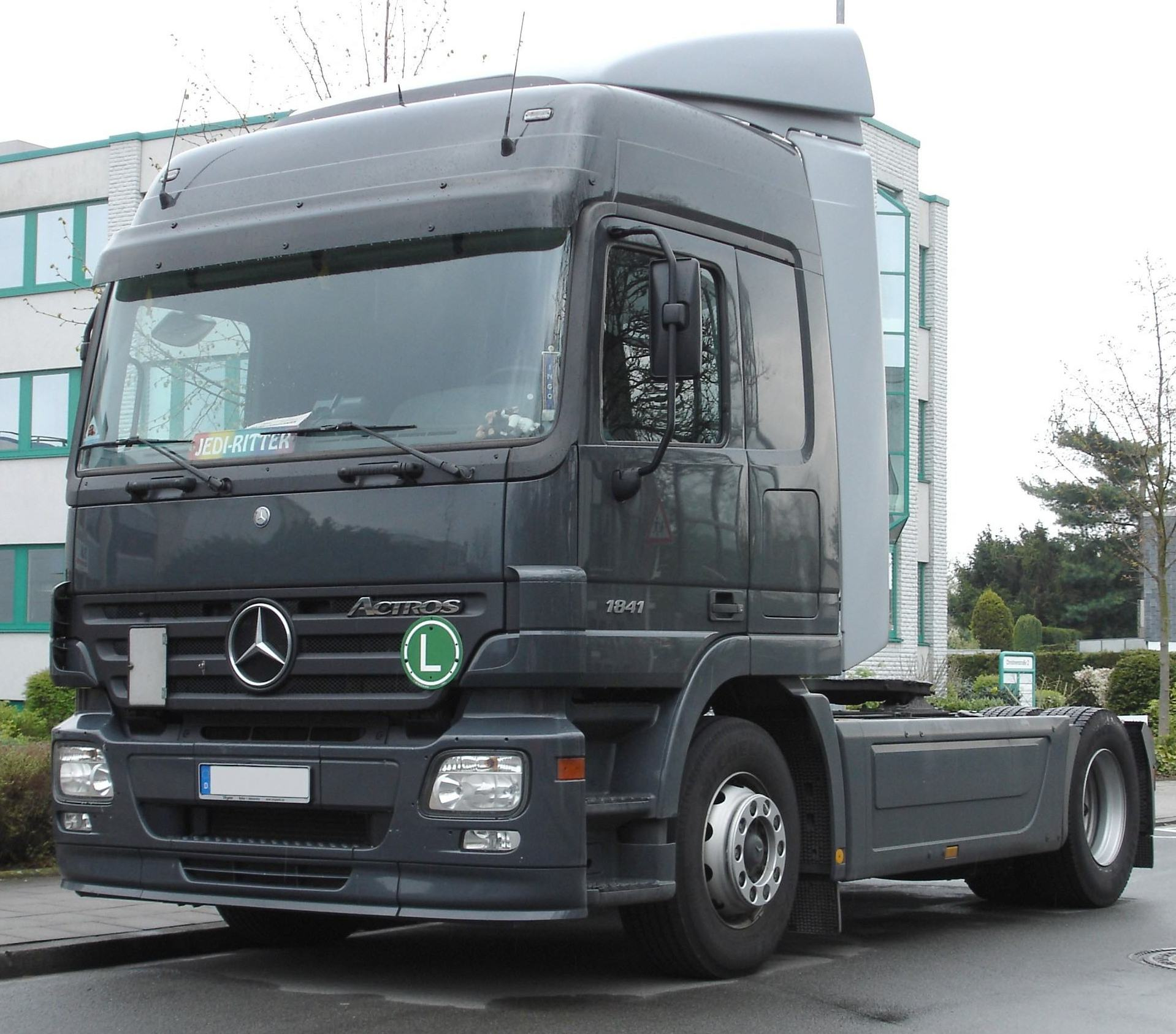
MBM also assembles Mercedes-Benz and Mitsubishi Fuso commercial vehicles.

The first Mercedes-Benz cars from the DCM and MTB joint venture rolled off the assembly line in early 2005. By 2007, Mercedes-Benz passenger models from the C, E and S-Class nameplates were being assembled on three separate assembly lines. Assembly of Mercedes-Benz commercial models and Mitsubishi Fuso vehicles also took place at an adjacent facility. In January 2008, DaimlerChrysler Malaysia was renamed Mercedes-Benz Malaysia, following the Mercedes-Benz and Chrysler demerger. Since 2004, Mercedes-Benz has invested over RM300 million in their Pekan operations. The Mercedes-Benz Malaysia plant has since produced nine different passenger models from the C-Class (W203, W204 and W205), E-Class (W211, W212 and W213), S-Class (V221 and V222), and GLC-Class (X253) nameplates respectively. Since 2013, MBM has also produced hybrid and plug-in hybrid models, which benefit from extensive tax rebates under the government's EEV incentive. Production, sales and market share of Mercedes-Benz vehicles grew significantly in the 2010s, and cumulative volume has since surpassed 100,000 units. In late 2019, MBM commenced assembly of left-hand drive C-Class for export to the Philippines.

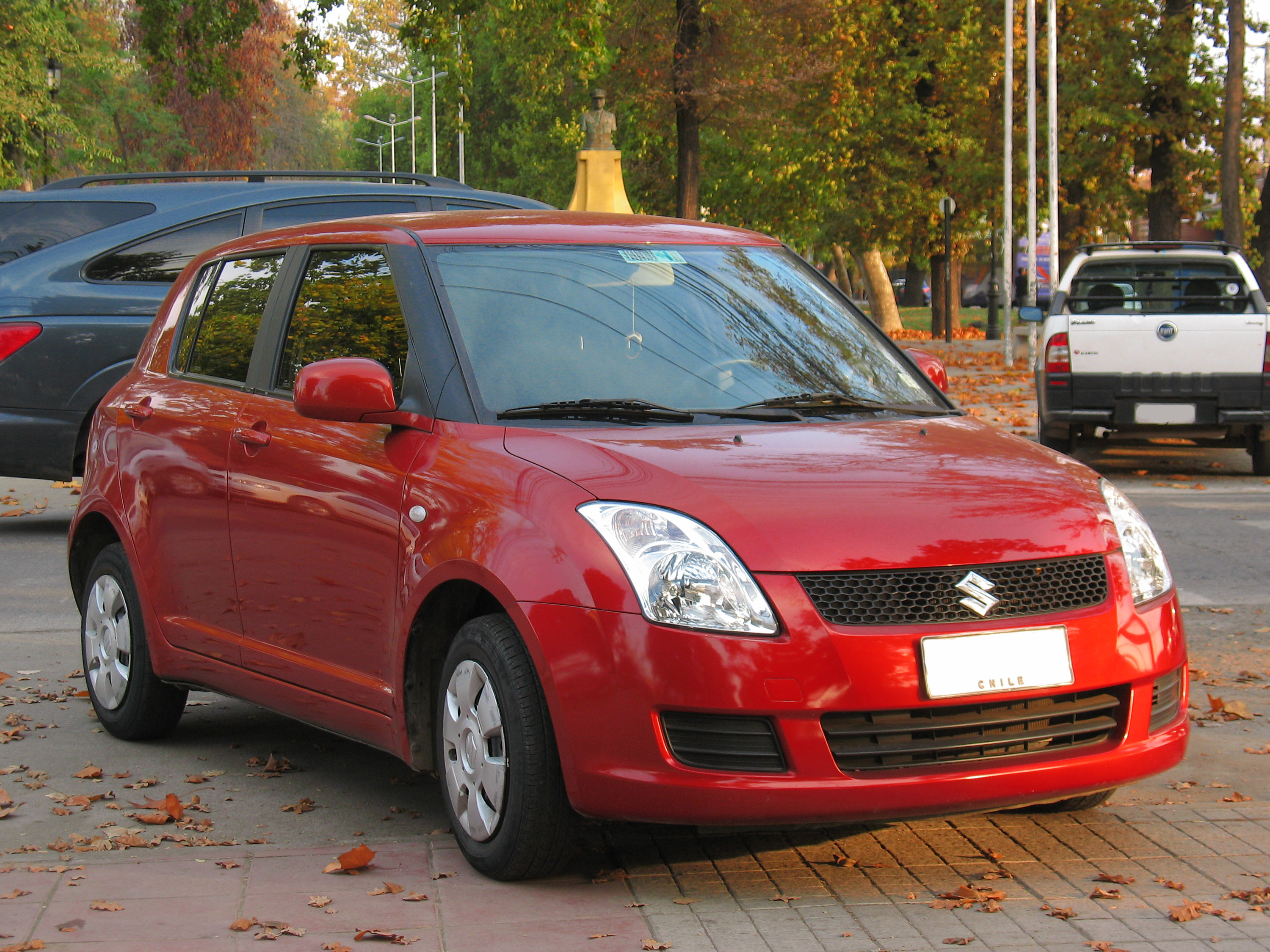
HAMM assembled the Suzuki Swift. A small number were also exported to Brunei.

Around the time when MTB secured their contract assembly agreement with Mercedes-Benz, AMM had also received a separate contract deal for the assembly of Suzuki passenger cars when DRB-HICOM was awarded the Suzuki franchise for the Malaysian market. DRB-HICOM established Suzuki Malaysia Automobile (SMA) in December 2004, and plans were made to assemble the Suzuki Swift on a dedicated assembly line at the Pekan complex. Although low volumes were anticipated, Suzuki invested RM20 million to establish a robotic welding line to ensure quality control and efficiency. The first Swift units from Suzuki Malaysia Automobile were produced in June 2007.

In early 2008, Suzuki Malaysia Automobile became a three-way 40:40:20 joint venture between DRB-HICOM, Suzuki and Itochu, when the latter two acquired stakes in the operation. In November 2008, AMM was renamed HICOM Automotive Manufacturers (Malaysia) Sdn. Bhd. (HAMM). Local assembly of the next generation Swift commenced in May 2013. In June 2015, Suzuki and Proton entered into a partnership, in which selected Suzuki models would be rebadged and produced by Proton for the Malaysian market. To prevent sales overlapping between Proton and Suzuki models, Suzuki voluntarily withdrew from the Malaysian market, and local assembly, imports and sales of Suzuki-badged cars ceased by 2016. Suzuki's local assembly operations in Malaysia have since transitioned to Proton's Tanjung Malim plant by way of the Ertiga MPV.

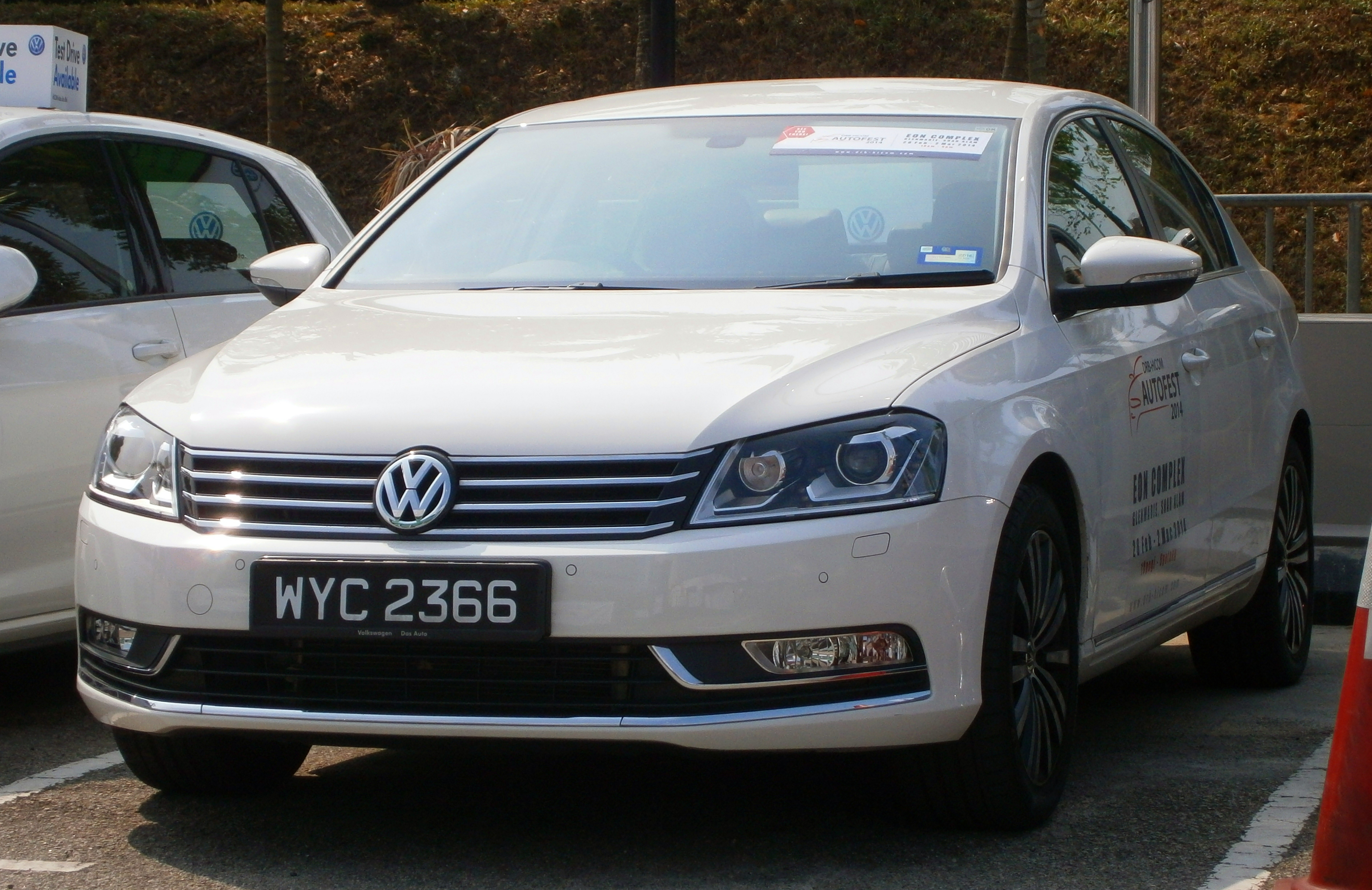
The B7 Passat became the debut model for the Volkswagen Pekan Plant.

By the dawn of the 2010s, HAMM had commenced contract assembly of Volkswagen passenger vehicles as part of an agreement with DRB-HICOM and Volkswagen. Prior to the agreement with DRB-HICOM, Volkswagen had initially pursued a partnership with Proton. Volkswagen had sought to utilise Proton's new Tanjung Malim plant as their manufacturing hub in ASEAN, and had also planned to collaborate with Proton on the development of ASEAN-market models. Two rounds of discussions between Proton and Volkswagen took place between 2004 and 2007, but various complications and political intervention prevented further developments between the two companies. After the discussions with Proton ended inconclusively, Volkswagen signed a contract assembly agreement with DRB-HICOM instead.

The Volkswagen Pekan Plant (VPP) was set up within the Pekan complex, and the first VPP-built Volkswagen cars rolled off the assembly line in March 2012. VPP has since produced six different Volkswagen models from the Passat, Polo, Vento, Jetta and Tiguan nameplates. VPP is also one of only two Malaysian plants to have used laser welding in the assembly process. The knock down kits and engines are shipped in from Volkswagen's plants in Germany, Mexico, India and South Africa. In late 2014, Volkswagen expressed intentions to export their Malaysian-built models to ASEAN markets, but various complications have since throttled Volkswagen's ASEAN expansion plans.

In late 2016, HICOM Automotive Manufacturers (Malaysia) changed its abbreviation to HA, from HAMM previously. In July 2017, HA built a new paint shop at the cost of RM230 million. The new paint shop is highly automated, and is the nation's first to feature a 360-degree rotating electro-dipping (ED) process, which is more efficient than conventional vertical ED systems. Mercedes-Benz Malaysia's models are currently painted at the new paint shop.

=== New National Car Project (NNCP) ===
The New National Car Project (NNCP) is the given name of an industrial initiative tasked with the development of a new Malaysian automobile company. The NNCP aims to create the third national car company after Proton and Peroduaproach will not follow the government-funded, foreign technology-dependent formula used to create Proton and Perodua, but will instead be funded by domestic private sector institutions with primarily local talent and technologies. Nonetheless, there are plans to collaborate with foreign companies in the short term.

Prime Minister Mahathir Mohamad, the main proponent of the third national car, justifies the need for its existence as part of a long-term vision for Malaysia to develop self-sufficiency with high-tech industries and a highly skilled labour force. Mahathir argues that a competitive automotive industry is a necessary pre-requisite for Malaysia to be considered a developed nation. Additionally, the sale of Proton to China-based Geely also contributed to the NNCP cause. Mahathir had championed Proton since its inception, and strongly objected to any foreign buyout of Proton. The NNCP is often cited as an indirect replacement to Proton, which Mahathir no longer regards as a truly Malaysian car company.

In October 2018, the Malaysian Industry-Government Group for High Technology (MIGHT), an agency under the Prime Minister's Department tasked to oversee the New National Car Project, announced that several companies have been shortlisted, including SilTerra, a Kulim-based semiconductor manufacturer, and Cyberjaya-based Composites Technology Research Malaysia (CTRM), a composite component manufacturer. SilTerra is a wholly owned subsidiary of Khazanah Nasional, while CTRM is a unit of DRB-HICOM. Both companies are government linked, but the government and Mahathir Mohamad have repeatedly promised that no public funds would be used to fund the NNCP.

Additionally, MIGHT has unveiled that the NNCP will include semi-autonomous technology, and be built on a modular platform. Both hybrid and battery electric powertrains are also under consideration. To keep startup costs low and to shorten the overall launch frame, the NNCP vehicles may be produced at an existing automobile plant. The NNCP has a targeted 2020 launch, with plans for ASEAN exports in the near future.

In August 2019, the Ministry of International Trade and Industry shortlisted Cyberjaya-based DreamEdge as the company which will spearhead the NNCP, with technical assistance from Daihatsu. MITI reiterated that the NNCP will be privately funded and domestically owned. The first NNCP product, reportedly a plus-sized B-segment sedan with a standard ICE or hybrid powertrain, will launch in early 2021. Additionally, it has since been hinted that Perodua may also become involved in the NNCP due to its pre-existing joint-venture with Daihatsu. Later, it was announced that the NNCP launch would be delayed to early 2022, while overall investment costs are estimated to reach RM1 billion.

== See also ==
- List of automobile manufacturers of Malaysia
- List of automotive assembly plants in Malaysia
- Transport in Malaysia
