= List of Malaysians of Chinese descent =

This is a list of notable Malaysians of Chinese origin, including original immigrants who obtained Malaysian citizenship and their Malaysian descendants. Entries on this list are demonstrably notable by having a linked current article or reliable sources as footnotes against the name to verify they are notable and define themselves either full or partial Chinese, whose ethnic origin lie in China.

This list also includes emigrant Malaysians of Chinese origin and could be taken as a list of famous Malaysians of Chinese origin.

== Entertainment ==
=== Film ===
- Amber Chia (谢丽萍) – international model and actress
- Angelica Lee Sin Je (李心洁) – award-winning actress
- Angie Cheung (张慧仪) – actress based in Hong Kong
- Carmen Soo (苏慧敏) – international model and actress
- Carrie Lee Sze Kei (李詩琪) – international actress and host; Miss Chinese Cosmos International 2004/05 Champion, Phoenix TV Hong Kong
- Chen Han Wei (陈汉玮) – award-winning television actor based in Singapore
- Chris Tong (童冰玉) – actress
- Christopher Lee (李銘順)– leading television actor in Singapore; has also acted in joint China-Taiwan-HK-Singapore productions
- Fish Liew (廖子妤）– award-winning actress and model based in Hong Kong
- Hannah Tan – singer and actress from Sarawak
- Isaac Hor (贺倾文) – online personality, post, and emcee
- James Lee (李添兴) – film director
- James Wan (温子仁) – film director. Wan was born in Kuching, Malaysia before migrating to Australia when he was seven years old.
- Howard Hon Kahoe - actor from Kuala Lumpur
- Hun Haqeem - actor from Kuching
- Jesseca Liu (刘子绚) – actress from Langkawi, based in Singapore
- Koe Yeet (高艺) – television and movie actress
- Lai Meng (黎明) – veteran actress
- Ling Tan (陈曼龄) – international model
- Lyndel Soon (孙玉心) – international actress
- Melvin Sia (谢佳见) – Sarawak, Malaysian/Taiwan actor, model, host, singer
- Michelle Yeoh (杨紫琼) – international actress
- Mimi Chu (朱咪咪) - actress, singer, host, and emcee based in Hong Kong
- Ng Tian Hann (黄天汉) – director
- Phyllis Quek (郭妃丽) – television actress and singer based in Singapore
- Shaun Chen (陈泓宇) – actor based in Singapore
- Tan Chui Mui (陈翠梅) – film director, won an award in Pusan Film Festival 2006
- Tsai Ming-liang (蔡明亮) – Taiwan-based award-winning director
- Vivien Yeo (楊秀惠) – television actress who has acted in Hong Kong movies and serials
- Yang Bao Bei (杨宝贝) - film actress and YouTuber
- Nicholas Teo (张栋梁) - Singer and Voice Actor

=== Comedy ===
- Douglas Lim (林有信) - comedian, actor, television presenter and YouTuber
- Nigel Ng (黄瑾瑜) – UK-based Malaysian stand-up comedian (Uncle Roger) and YouTuber
- Ronny Chieng (钱信伊) – stand-up comedian

=== Fine arts ===
- Yong Mun Sen (杨曼生; 1896–1962) –-Kuching born Penangite watercolorist and Malaysian artist; "father of Malaysian painting"; one of the founders of Nanyang Academy of Fine Arts or NAFA, Singapore, Penang Art Society
- C. N. Liew (刘庆伦; born 1975) – K.L.-born artist who took the traditional artform of calligraphy to a whole new dimension with his creation of Surrealligraphy
- Chang Fee Ming (郑辉明；born 1959) – Terengganu-born watercolor painter
- Poesy Liang (梁小詩；born 1975) – multidisciplinary artist, poet, composer
- Red Hong Yi (康怡) - Sabah-born artist and architectural designer
- Tang Tuck Kan (鄧德根; 1934–2012)- Pioneer Artist of Malaysian Modern Art Movement in the 60s and 70s.
- Lee Lee Lan (1944–2022) – Malaysian ballet dancer and choreographer

=== Music ===
- Ah Niu (Tan Kheng Seong, 阿牛 / 陈庆祥) – singer
- Alicia Wong Ling Ling (黃羚棱) - member of K-pop girl group Kiiras
- Andrew Tan (陈势安) – Taiwan-based singer
- Danell Lee Chieh Hun (李桀汉) – singer who won the second season of Malaysian Idol
- Elizabeth Tan (谭素美) – singer-songwriter
- Eric Moo (巫启贤) – Taiwan-based singer
- Fish Leong (梁静茹) – Taiwan-based singer
- Freya Lim (林凡) - Taiwan-born Malaysian Mandopop singer
- Fuying & Sam – Malaysian music duo
- Imee Ooi (黃慧音) - Chinese-Malaysian record producer, composer, and singer who composes and arranges music for classic Buddhist chant, mantra, and dharani.
- Gary Cao (曹格) – singer and composer
- Gin Lee (李幸倪) - Hong Kong-based singer
- Isaac Voo Kai Meng (邬凯名) - member of K-Pop group IN2IT
- Karen Kong (龚建思 / 龚柯允) – singer from Labuan; performs in Malay, which is unique for a Malaysian Chinese singer
- Michael Wong (王光良) – singer
- Namewee (Wee Meng Chee / 黄明志) – singer-songwriter
- Nicholas Teo (张栋梁) – singer
- Penny Tai (戴佩妮) – singer-songwriter who won the best composer in the 17th Golden Melody Awards
- Quincy Tan (陈仁丰) – singer-songwriter
- Rynn Lim (林宇中) – singer
- Tan Zhi Hui Celine (陈紫薇)– Indonesia-based singer and member of idol group JKT48
- Victor Wong (黄品冠) – singer and composer
- Vince Chong (张英胜) – singer
- You Zhangjing (尤长靖) - member of C-Pop group Nine Percent

=== Fashion ===
- Jimmy Choo (周仰杰) – born in Penang, footwear designer based in London
- Sheena Liam (粘悦馨) – Asia's Next Top Model (cycle 2) winner

=== Beauty pageant titleholders ===
- Alexis Sue-Ann Seow - Miss World Malaysia 2019, model, fashion blogger and emcee. She competed at the Miss World 2019 and was placed as one of the top 40 semi-finalists.
- Carey Ng – Miss Universe Malaysia 2013
- Jane Teoh - Miss Universe Malaysia 2018
- Josephine Lena Wong - Miss Malaysia Universe 1970 and was placed as one of the Top 15 semi-finalists of Miss Universe 1970.
- Larissa Ping Liew - Miss World Malaysia 2018 and was placed as one of the Top 30 semi-finalists of Miss World 2018. She is of Chinese and Kenyah parentage.
- Levy Li - Miss Malaysia Universe 2008
- Lesley Cheam - Miss Universe Malaysia 2022

== Businesspeople ==
- Major China Dato' Tan Hiok Nee – wealthiest and most influential Chinese in Johor during the 19th century
- Tan Chay Yan - rubber plantation merchant and philanthropist, was noted in Malayan history as the first man to plant rubber on a commercial basis
- Cheah Cheang Lim – a businessman and miner, also involved in the anti-opium movement and campaigned for Chinese status in the Malaya
- Robert Kuok – richest man in Malaysia and southeast Asia as of 2011
- Lim Goh Tong – billionaire businessman who developed Genting Highlands and owns Genting Group
- Chen Lip Keong - businessman and casino owner of NagaWorld. Ranked #7 in Malaysia's 50 Richest in 2018
- Lim Kang Hoo – 19th richest person in Malaysia, as of 2014
- Cheong Yoke Choy – tin miner, philanthropist and benefactor of Chinese education during the British Malaya era
- Choong Chin Liang – businessman and philanthropist, "Heart Man" of Ipoh
- Chung Keng Quee – first Malaysian-Chinese capitalist; innovator in tin mining; owner of the largest mine of all in the country at that time, the Kong Loon Kongsi, in Kamunting, Perak; has business interests in Mergui, Peru, Hong Kong and China; founder of the Penang Chinese Town Hall
- Chung Thye Phin – first Malaysian-Chinese miner to introduce the latest appliances on the mines, under the supervision of a European engineer; founder of the Toh Allang Chinese Tin Company in Perak, the first Chinese limited liability company, in 1925; member of the Penang Chinese Chamber of Commerce
- Eu Tong Sen – founder of Eu Yan Sang
- Foo Choo Choon – Hakka tin miner, revenue farmer and businessman from Penang; in his time, was said to have been the richest Chinese person in the world
- Francis Yeoh – runs YTL Group; son of Yeoh Tiong Lay
- Lee Loy Seng – founder of Kuala Lumpur Kepong Berhad
- Lee Shin Cheng – Chairman/CEO of Malaysian conglomerate IOI Group; 2nd richest person in Malaysia as of 2011
- Leong Sin Nam – Malaysian businessman
- Loh Boon Siew – of Boon Siew Honda
- Loke Yew – businessman and philanthropist during British Malaya
- Mark Chang Mun Kee – founder of MOL AccessPortal and JobStreet.com, current CEO of JobStreet.com
- Peter Pek – group managing director of the Malaysian operations of Mercatus+, spokesperson on branding
- Phan Ying Tong - Founder, managing director and CEO of Oriental Bank PLC
- Quek Leng Chan – chairman and co-founder of Hong Leong Group; 5th richest person in Malaysia as of 2011
- Jeffrey Cheah Fook Ling – Sunway Group founder and chairman, the 19th richest person in Malaysia as of 2011
- Lim Kok Thay – current CEO of Genting Group; 13th richest person in Malaysia as of 2011
- William Cheng – Chairman of Lion Group, which also owns Parkson Group; 16th richest person in Malaysia as of 2011
- Teh Hong Piow – chairman and founder of Public Bank; 6th richest person in Malaysia as of 2011
- Teoh Tiang Chye – merchant, philanthropist, and Justice of the Peace in Malacca.
- Tiong Hiew King – media and timber tycoon, controls Chinese media, Ming Pao and Sin Chew Daily, managing director/CEO of Rimbunan Hijau Group; 10th richest person in Malaysia as of 2011
- Vincent Tan Chee Yioun – businessman, owner of Berjaya Group; 9th richest person in Malaysia as of 2011
- Yeap Chor Ee – Was once the richest man within Malaysia, but the family is still considered to be one of the richest
- Yeoh Tiong Lay – founder of YTL Group; 7th richest person in Malaysia as of 2011
- Lillian Too – feng shui master
- Chan Tien Ghee – Businessman and former chairman of Cardiff City Football Club, Wales.
- Tan Hock Eng - CEO of Broadcom Inc., the highest earning CEO in the US in 2017. Was born and raised in Penang, Malaysia

== Gastronomy ==
- Kwan Swee Lian - Chef and businessperson, known as 'Queen of Nasi Lemak'
- Kwen Liew - Malaysian chef based in Paris, France
- Sherson Lian - Celebrity chef, television host

== Medicine, science and technology ==
- Lim Boon Keng (1868–1957) – first Malayan to receive a Queen's Scholarship, gained admission to the University of Edinburgh and graduated in 1892 with a first class honours degree in medicine
- Wu Lien-teh (伍连德) (1879–1960) – renowned plague fighter and pioneer in the modernization of China's public health system; first medical student of Chinese descent to study at University of Cambridge in 1896, after winning the Queen's Scholarship held in Singapore; first Malaysian Chinese nominated to receive a Nobel Prize in Medicine, in 1935
- Gu Hongming - Penang-born scholar and famous professor in Peking University firstly established
- Pua Khein-Seng (潘建成) – CEO of Phison Electronics Corporation, arguably one of the inventors of the USB flash drive
- Cheah Ming Tatt – biologist specializing in immunology and genetics, a recipient of Howard Hughes Medical Institute's Future Scientists Fellowship for his work on RNA splicing
- Shu Jie Lam - Research Chemist at University of Melbourne
- Moi Meng Ling - virologist and professor at the University of Tokyo
- Chiang Ti Ming (张世明) (1976–2007) - child prodigy and particle physicist

== Legal ==
- Wee Chong Jin – First Chief Justice of Singapore (1963–1990)
- Yong Pung How – Second Chief Justice of Singapore (1990–2006)
- Chan Sek Keong – Third Chief Justice of Singapore (2006–2012)
- Tan Boon Teik – Attorney-General of Singapore (1969–1992)
- Chang Min Tat – former Federal Court judge
- Lim Beng Hong (B. H. Oon) (1898–1979) – pioneering female lawmaker
- Ong Hock Thye – former Chief Justice of Malaya

== Politicians ==
=== Early history ===
- Kapitan China Koh Lay Huan (辜禮歡) – first Kapitan China of Penang, and also the Kapitan Cina of Kedah at Kuala Muda
- Kapitan China Tan Kee Soon - first Kapitan China of Tebrau, Johor Bahru and also the first leader of Ngee Heng Kongsi of Johor
- Kapitan China Seah Tee Heng - third Kapitan China of Johor, was one of two Chinese members to the Council of State
- Major China Dato' Tan Hiok Nee – wealthiest and most influential Chinese in Johor during the 19th century, Johor Kapitan China, the second leader of the Ngee Heng Kongsi of Johor, one of the Kangchu Johor; Jalan Tan Hiok Nee in Johor Bahru is named after him
- Kapitan China Lim Ah Siang - third leader of the Ngee Heng Kongsi of Johor
- Capitan China Chung Keng Quee – leader of the "Five Associations" or Go-Kuan and the Hai San, Kapitan China of Perak and Penang, member of the Commission for the Pacification of Larut, founding member of the Perak State Council
- Kapitan China Yap Ah Loy – third Kapitan China of Kuala Lumpur, played an important role in developing the city as a commercial and mining centre during the 19th century
- Kapitan China Yap Ah Shak – fourth Kapitan China of Kuala Lumpur, a wealthy merchant and a Hai San leader
- Kapitan China Yap Kwan Seng - fifth and last Kapitan China of Kuala Lumpur
- Kapitan Chung Thye Phin – last Kapitan China of Perak, member of Perak State Council
- Kapitan China Ong Tiang Swee - Kapitan China of Sarawak and President of the Chinese Chamber of Commerce, an advisor on Chinese Affairs and confidant to Rajah Charles Brooke
- Chung Kok Ming – member of Perak State Council, member of the Federal Council of the Federated Malay States
- Wong Ah Fook S.M.J. – one of the most famous Kangchu Johor and Chinese Entrepreneur in Johor during the 19th century; Jalan Wong Ah Fook in Johor Bahru is named after him
- Tun Leong Yew Koh – first Malacca Governor, only Chinese ever appointed as the Yang di-Pertua Negeri in Malaysia, co-founder and first Secretary-General of MCA
- Colonel Tun Sir Henry Lee Hau Shik – first Finance Minister of the Federation of Malaya and co-founded the Malaysian Chinese Association and Alliance Party
- Hang Li Po – wife of Malacca's Sultan Mansur Shah (1456–1477); related to the Ming royal court

=== Malayan Communist Party ===
- Chin Peng – Secretary-General of the Malayan Communist Party
- Chen Tien – Head of the Central Propaganda Department of the Malayan Communist Party
- Eu Chooi Yip – Secretary of the Malayan Democratic Union
- Lau Yew – Commander-in-Chief of the Malayan People's Anti Japanese Army
- Lee Meng – guerrilla and leading member of the CPM
- Suriani Abdullah – Member of the Central Committee of the Malayan Communist Party
- Yeung Kwo – Deputy Secretary-General of the Malayan Communist Party

=== Malaysian Chinese Association ===
- Tun Dato Sir Tan Cheng Lock – founder and the first president of the Malayan Chinese Association (MCA)
- Tun Tan Siew Sin – third president of MCA, first Minister of Commerce and Industry, Finance Minister for 15 years
- Tan Sri Dato' Lee San Choon – fourth president of MCA, held various ministerial posts in the cabinet from 1969 to 1983
- Tan Sri Dr. Tan Koon Swan – fifth president of MCA
- Tun Dr. Ling Liong Sik – sixth president of MCA, former Malaysian Minister for Transport
- Tan Sri Dato' Seri Ong Ka Ting – seventh president of MCA, former Housing and Local Government Minister from 1999 to 2008 and Acting Transport Minister from May to June 2003
- Tan Sri Dato' Sri Ong Tee Keat – eighth president of MCA, Transport Minister from March 2008 to June 2010
- Tan Sri Datuk Seri Dr. Chua Soi Lek – ninth president of MCA, Minister of Health from 2004 to 2008
- Dato' Sri Liow Tiong Lai – tenth president of MCA, Minister of Health from March 2008 to May 2013 and Minister of Transport from June 2014 to May 2018
- Datuk Seri Wee Ka Siong – current President of MCA and current Minister of Transport, Minister in the Prime Minister's Department (2014–2018)
- Tan Sri Datuk Seri Dr. Fong Chan Onn – former vice-president of MCA, former Minister of Human Resources
- Dato' Seri Ong Ka Chuan – secretary-general for MCA twice, Minister of Housing and Local Government from 2008 to 2009, Second Minister for International Trade and Industry from 2015 to 2018
- Ng Yen Yen – Former Minister of Tourism Malaysia, former Member of the Malaysian Parliament for Raub, Pahang, MCA Vice-president
- Chua Tee Yong – son of Chua Soi Lek. Former Deputy Minister of Finance I, former Deputy Minister of Agriculture and Agro-based Industries of Malaysia, former Johor MCA Youth Chief
- Kong Cho Ha – former Minister of Transport Malaysia, former MCA Secretary-General, former Member of the Malaysian Parliament for Lumut, Perak
- Chor Chee Heung – former Minister of Housing and Local Government, Malaysia, former Member of the Malaysian Parliament for Alor Setar, Kedah
- Hou Kok Chung – former Deputy Ministry of Higher Education, Malaysia, former Member of the Malaysian Parliament for Kluang, Johor
- Lee Chee Leong – former Deputy Minister of Home Affairs, Malaysia; former Member of the Malaysian Parliament for Kampar, Perak
- Teng Boon Soon – Former Member of the Malaysian Parliament for Tebrau, Johor
- Tan Ah Eng – Former Member of the Malaysian Parliament for Gelang Patah, Johor
- Wee Jeck Seng – Member of the Malaysian Parliament for Tanjung Piai, Johor

=== Democratic Action Party ===
- Lim Kit Siang – current DAP Advisor, Once an ISA detainee after Operasi Lalang, former Member of Parliament for Iskandar Puteri (formerly known as Gelang Patah), Johor
- Lim Guan Eng – Former Minister of Finance, former Chief Minister of the State of Penang, Member of Parliament for Bagan, Penang
- Lim Lip Eng – Member of the Malaysian Parliament for Kepong, Kuala Lumpur
- Anthony Loke Siew Fook – Minister of Transport and current member of the Parliament for Seremban Negeri Sembilan
- Alice Lau Kiong Yieng – Deputy Speaker of Dewan Rakyat, Member of the Malaysian Parliament for Lanang, Sarawak
- Chong Chieng Jen – Member of the Malaysian Parliament for Stampin, Sarawak, current Sarawak state assemblyman for Stampin, Former Member of the Malaysian Parliament for Bandar Kuching, Sarawak
- Chong Eng – Former Member of the Malaysian Parliament for Bukit Mertajam, Penang, former Penang state assemblywoman for Padang Lalang
- Chow Kon Yeow – Current Chief Minister of the State of Penang, Member of the Malaysian Parliament for Batu Kawan, Penang, current Penang state assemblyman for Padang Kota
- Er Teck Hwa – Former member of the Malaysian Parliament for Bakri, Johor
- Fong Kui Lun – Member of the Malaysian Parliament for Bukit Bintang, Kuala Lumpu
- Fong Po Kuan – Former member of the Malaysian Parliament for Batu Gajah, Perak
- Hiew King Cheu – Former member of the Malaysian Parliament for Kota Kinabalu, Sabah
- Hsing Yin Shean – Former member of the Malaysian Parliament for Tanjong Aru, Sabah
- Liew Chin Tong – Current member of the Malaysian Parliament for Iskandar Puteri, Johor
- Michelle Ng Mei Sze – current Selangor state assemblywoman for Subang Jaya
- Nga Kor Ming – Minister of Housing and Local Government, Former Deputy Speaker of Dewan Rakyat, Member of the Malaysian Parliament for Teluk Intan, Perak, current Perak state assemblyman for Kepayang
- Ngeh Koo Ham – Former Speaker for Perak state legislative assembly, Member of the Malaysian Parliament for Beruas, Perak
- Oscar Ling Chai Yew – Member of the Malaysian Parliament for Sibu, Sarawak
- Sim Tong Him – Former member of the Malaysian Parliament of Kota Melaka, Malacca
- Steven Sim Chee Keong – Minister of Human Resoures, Member of the Malaysian Parliament for Bukit Mertajam, Penang
- Tan Kok Wai – Member of the Malaysian Parliament for Cheras, Kuala Lumpur and former President of DAP
- Jeff Ooi Chuan Aun – Former member of the Malaysian Parliament for Jelutong, Penang
- Tan Seng Giaw – Former member of Parliament for Kepong, Kuala Lumpur
- Teresa Kok Suh Sim – Member of the Parliament for Seputeh, Kuala Lumpur
- Wong Ho Leng – Former Member of the Malaysian Parliament for Sibu, Sarawak
- Hannah Yeoh Tseow Suan – Minister of Youth and Sports, First women to become a state assembly speaker in Malaysia, current member of parliament for Segambut, Kuala Lumpur
- Teo Nie Ching – Member of the Malaysian Parliament for Kulai, Johor
- Tony Pua Kiam Wee – Former member of parliament of Damansara, Selangor
- Ong Kian Ming – Former member of parliament for Bangi, Selangor
- Wong Tack – Former of Parliament for Bentong, Pahang
- Violet Yong Wui Wui – Current Sarawak state assemblywoman for Pending
- Yeo Bee Yin – Current member of parliament for Puchong, Selangor, former Selangor state assemblywoman for Subang Jaya

=== Parti Gerakan Rakyat Malaysia ===
- Tun Dato' Seri Lim Chong Eu – Chief Minister of Penang (from 1969 to 1990), second president of MCA and founding president of Parti Gerakan Rakyat Malaysia, known as the "architect of Modern Penang"
- Tun Dr. Lim Keng Yaik – third president of Gerakan, one of the longest-serving ministers in the country and a highly revered statesman by the public
- Tan Sri Dr. Koh Tsu Koon – fourth president of Gerakan, Chief Minister of Penang (from 1990 to 2008), former Minister in the Prime Minister's Department Malaysia
- Datuk Seri Mah Siew Keong – fifth president of Parti Gerakan Rakyat Malaysia, former Member of the Malaysian Parliament for Telok Intan, Perak
- Datuk Liang Teck Meng – former Member of the Malaysian Parliament for Simpang Renggam, Johor
- Datin Paduka Tan Lian Hoe – former Member of the Malaysian Parliament for Gerik, Perak and former Deputy Ministry of Domestic Trade, Cooperative and Consumerism Malaysia

=== People's Justice Party ===
- Chang Lih Kang – Minister of Science and Technology, former Member of the Malaysian Parliament for Tanjong Malim, Perak, Vice President of People's Justice Party
- Chua Tian Chang – former Member of the Malaysian Parliament for Batu, Kuala Lumpur, Informatian Chief of People's Justice Party
- Chan Ming Kai – Political Secretary to the Prime Minister of Malaysia, former Member of the Malaysian Parliament for Alor Setar, Kedah, former Perak state assemblyman for Simpang Pulai, former Perlis state assemblyman for Indera Kayangan
- Gooi Hsiao-Leung – current Penang state assemblyman for Bukit Tengah, former Member of the Malaysian Parliament for Alor Setar, Kedah
- Jimmy Puah Wee Tse – current Member of the Malaysian Parliament for Tebrau, former Johor state assemblyman for Bukit Batu
- Lee Boon Chye – former Member of the Malaysian Parliament for Gopeng, Perak
- Lee Chean Chung – current Member of the Malaysian Parliament for Petaling Jaya, former Pahang state assemblyman for Semambu
- Chiew Choon Man – current Member of the Malaysian Parliament for Miri
- Chua Jui Meng – former Member of the Malaysian Parliament for Bakri, Johor
- Michael Teo Yu Keng – former Member of the Malaysian Parliament for Miri, Sarawak
- Christina Liew Chin Jin – former Sabah Deputy Chief Minister II, former Member of the Malaysian Parliament for Tawau, Sabah, former Sabah state assemblywoman for Api-Api
- Maria Chin Abdullah – former Member of the Malaysian Parliament for Petaling Jaya, Selangor, Deputy Spokesperson for Parliament and Administration of People's Justice Party
- Sim Tze Tzin – current Member of the Malaysian Parliament for Bayan Baru, former Deputy Minister of Agriculture and Agro-Based Industry, former Penang state assemblyman for Pantai Jerejak
- Tan Kar Hing – current Member of the Malaysian Parliament for Gopeng, former Perak state assemblyman for Simpang Pulai
- William Leong Jee Keen – current Member of the Malaysian Parliament for Selayang
- Wong Chen – current Member of the Malaysian Parliament for Subang

=== Pan-Malaysian Islamic Party ===
- Anuar Tan Abdullah @ Tan Teng Loon - current Kelantan state assemblyman for Kota Lama

=== North Kalimantan Communist Party ===
- Bong Kee Chok – Secretary of the Second Bureau of the Central Committee of the North Kalimantan Communist Party

=== Sarawak United Peoples' Party ===
- Sim Kui Hian – current Sarawak DeputY Premier III, current Sarawak state assemblyman for Batu Kawah
- Peter Chin Fah Kui – former Minister of Energy, Green Technology and Water Malaysia, former President of Sarawak United Peoples' Party, former Member of the Malaysian Parliament for Miri, Sarawak
- Chan Seng Khai – second mayor of Kuching South City Council
- Ding Kuong Hiing – former Member of the Malaysian Parliament for Sarikei, Sarawak
- Tiong Thai King – former Member of the Malaysian Parliament for Lanang, Sarawak
- Yong Khoon Seng – former Deputy Ministry of Works Malaysia, former Member of the Malaysian Parliament for Stampin, Sarawak
- Ding Kuong Hiing – former Member of the Malaysian Parliament for the Sarikei, Sarawak, current Sarawak state assemblyman for Meradong
- Huang Tiong Sii – Member of the Malaysian Parliament for Sarikei, Sarawak, current Sarawak state assemblyman for Repok

=== United Bumiputera Heritage Party ===
- Fatimah Abdullah @ Ting Sai Ming – current Sarawak state assemblywoman for Dalat

=== Progressive Democratic Party ===
- Tiong King Sing – Minister of Tourism, Arts and Culture, Member of the Malaysian Parliament for Bintulu, Sarawak

=== Sabah Heritage Party ===
- Liew Vui Keong – former Member of the Malaysian Parliament for Batu Sapi, Sabah, former Member of the Malaysian Parliament for Sandakan, Sabah

=== United Sabah Party ===
- Mary Yap Kain Ching – former Member of the Malaysian Parliament for Tawau, Sabah

=== Others ===
- Tan Sri Datuk Chong Kah Kiat – 13th Chief Minister of Sabah, former president of the Liberal Democratic Party (LDP)
- Hee Yit Foong – former Perak state assemblywoman for Jelapang
- Tan Tee Beng – former Member of the Malaysian Parliament for Nibong Tebal, Penang
- Wee Choo Keong – former Member of the Malaysian Parliament for Wangsa Maju, Kuala Lumpur (from 2008 to 2013)
- James Wong Kim Min – first Deputy Chief Minister of Sarawak; president of the Sarawak National Party (SNAP)
- Khaw Boon Wan – serving as the Coordinating Minister for Infrastructure and the Minister for Transport in Singapore since 2015
- Lee Bee Wah – serving as Member of Parliament (MP) for Nee Soon Group Representation Constituency in Singapore
- Foo Mee Har – serving as Member of Parliament (MP) for West Coast Group Representation Constituency in Singapore
- Chin Tet Yung – former Singaporean Member of Parliament (MP) for Sembawang Group Representation Constituency in Singapore
- Jing Lee – South Australian politician
- Penny Wong – Foreign Minister of Australia, South Australian politician
- Sam Lim – West Australian politician

== Sportspeople ==
=== Badminton ===
- Lee Chong Wei – former world No.1 men's singles shuttler; record ten-time Malaysia Open winner; 2006 and 2010 Commonwealth Games gold medalist; 2008, 2012 and 2016 Olympics silver medalist; World Championship silver and bronze medalist; Asian Games silver and bronze medalist; three-time All England Open champion; a total of 55 career titles won as of 2014
- Eddy Choong – men's singles shuttler; brother of David E. L. Choong; four-time All-England Open champion
- Wong Peng Soon – Malaysian-born men's singles shuttler who later represented Singapore; four-time All-England Open champion and record holder for the most Malaysia Open titles (8) won for over 60 years before being surpassed by Lee Chong Wei in 2013
- David E. L. Choong – men's singles shuttler. Brother of Eddy Choong; All-England champion in 1951, 1952, and 1953
- Ng Boon Bee – All-England Open men's doubles champion in 1965, 1966, and 1971; member of Malaysia's winning Thomas Cup team in 1967
- Tan Yee Khan – All-England Open men's doubles champion with Ng Boon Bee in 1965 and 1966, and a member of Malaysia's winning Thomas Cup team in 1967
- Tan Aik Huang – former All-England Open men's singles champion
- Koo Kien Keat – former world No.1 men's doubles pair with Tan Boon Heong; Asian Games gold and silver medalist; World Championships silver and bronze medalist; All-England Open Champions; two-time Commonwealth Games gold medalist in men's doubles and 2012 London Olympics semifinalists
- Tan Boon Heong – former world No.1 men's doubles pair with Koo Kien Keat; Asian Games gold and silver medalist, World Championships silver and bronze medalist, All-England Open Champions, 2010 Commonwealth Games gold medalist, 2012 London Olympics semifinalists and former World Junior Champion
- Chan Chong Ming – men's doubles shuttler; 2006 Commonwealth Games gold medalist; World Championships and Asian Games bronze medalist; two-time World Junior Champion
- Chan Peng Soon – former world No.3 mixed doubles pair with Goh Liu Ying
- Goh Liu Ying – former world No.3 mixed doubles pair with Chan Peng Soon
- Wong Mew Choo – former world No.7 women's singles shuttler; 2006 and 2010 Commonwealth Games silver medalist; wife to Lee Chong Wei as of 2012
- Cheah Soon Kit – former world no.1 men's doubles shuttler; 1996 Olympics silver medalist with Yap Kim Hock, member of Malaysia's 1992 winning Thomas cup team, World Cup and World Grand Prix gold medalist, Commonwealth Games gold and silver medalist, World Championships silver and bronze medalist and Asian Games silver medalist
- Yap Kim Hock – men's doubles shuttler; 1996 Olympics silver medalist with Cheah Soon Kit; World Grand Prix gold medalist; Commonwealth Games gold and silver medalist; World Championship silver and bronze medalist; Asian Games bronze medalist
- Wong Choong Hann – former world No.2 men's singles shuttler; 2003 World Championships silver medalist; Commonwealth Games gold, silver and bronze medalist
- Ong Ewe Hock – former world No.2 men's singles shuttler; 1994 Commonwealth games silver medalist
- Goh Jin Wei - professional badminton player. She is a two-time BWF World Junior Championships champion and gold medalist in the girls' singles at the 2018 Summer Youth Olympics
- Aaron Chia - national men's doubles player. Together with Soh Wooi Yik, he is the first Malaysian to win the gold medal at the BWF World Championships.
- Soh Wooi Yik - national men's doubles player. Together with Aaron Chia, he is the first Malaysian to win the gold medal at the BWF World Championships.
- Lee Zii Jia - professional badminton player who currently ranked 3 in men's singles.

=== Diving ===
- Cheong Jun Hoong – former national diver and silver medalist in 10m synchronized diving at the 2016 Olympics with Pandelela Rinong. She became Malaysia's first diving world champion at the 2017 World Aquatics Championships.
- Datuk Leong Mun Yee – former national diver, silver medalist at the 2019 World Aquatics Championships and two-time Asian Games silver medalist.
- Ng Yan Yee - national diver, 7-time Southeast Asian Games gold medalist.
- Ooi Tze Liang – won gold medal in springboard and silver medal in platform at the 2014 Commonwealth Games.
- Yeoh Ken Nee – won bronze medal in springboard diving at the 2002 and 2010 Asian Games.

=== Swimming ===
- Alex Lim – won gold medal in backstroke at the 1998 Asian games, silver medal in backstroke at 2002 Commonwealth games
- Khiew Hoe Yean - national swimmer who represented Malaysia at the 2022 World Aquatics Championships.
- Welson Sim – competed in the men's 400 metre freestyle at the 2016 Olympics.

=== Football ===
- Brendan Gan
- Darren Lok
- Dion Cools
- Soh Chin Aun – former captain of Malaysia's national football team
- Lim Teong Kim – retired Malaysian football player; former assistant coach of Bayern Munich U-19 team
- Ong Kim Swee – head coach of Malaysia national football team
- Hong Wan
- La’Vere Corbin-Ong
- Quentin Cheng
- Richard Chin
- Dominic Tan
- Damien Lim
- Michael Wong
- Zachary Chung
- Joshua Ang
- Aiden Ang
- Matthew Wei-Jun Lee

=== Cycling ===
- Josiah Ng – won silver medals in track cycling at the 2002, 2006, and 2010 Asian Games; won gold medal in track cycling at 2010 Commonwealth Games
- Ng Joo Ngan – former Commonwealth Games cycling champion

=== Misc. ===
- Chung Thye Yong – first Chinese rugby player in Malaysia; first racehorse owner in the country
- Chung Kok Ming – one of the finest tennis players in the country during his time – first Asian committee member of Perak Turf Club
- Alex Yoong – Formula One racer

== Writers ==
- Yangsze Choo, fantasy novelist
- Gu Hongming 辜鸿铭 (1857–1928), famous Chinese scholar from Penang; in 1873 he began studying literature at the University of Edinburgh, graduating in 1877 with an M.A.
- Tash Aw – author of The Harmony Silk Factory, which made the Man Booker Prize 2005 longlist and won the 2005 Whitbread First Novel award
- Woon Swee Oan – author of wuxia novels
- Ho Sok Fong - short story writer, longlisted for Warwick Prize for Women in Translation
- Tan Twan Eng – Penangite author of The Gift of Rain, which was longlisted for the Man Booker Prize award, and The Garden of Evening Mists, which was shortlisted for the Man Booker Prize and the IMPAC Literary Prize, and won the Man Asian Literary Prize and the Sir Walter Scott Prize for Historical Fiction
- Kevin Nyiau 杨建伟, Kedah author of Hope is at the Turning Point | 希望在转角
- Ed Yong, Malaysian-born British science journalist, staff writer for the Atlantic.

== Criminals ==
- Took Leng How, a Malaysian Chinese from Penang who murdered a Chinese girl named Huang Na in Singapore. He was sentenced to death and hanged in Singapore's state gallows in 2006.
- Yong Vui Kong, an ethnic Chinese Malaysian from Sabah, Malaysia. He was sentenced to death for drug trafficking in Singapore in 2008, but subsequently, in 2013, he escaped the death sentence and was re-sentenced to life imprisonment and 15 strokes of the cane following the 2013 changes to Singapore's death penalty laws and a subsequent re-trial by the High Court of Singapore.
- Nyu Kok Meng, a convicted robber who was, in 1983, involved in the armed robbery of a businessman in Andrew Road, Singapore. His partner-in-crime, Sek Kim Wah, without Nyu's knowledge and consent, killed three of the five robbery victims the duo took hostage in an attempt to silence them before Nyu discovered Sek's monstrous acts and went on to protect the remaining two victims and assisted them in their escape from Sek. Hence, Nyu escaped the murder charges and he was sentenced to life imprisonment and 6 strokes of the cane for being armed with a rifle while committing armed robbery under the 1973 Arms Offences Act.
- Botak Chin, Malaysian gunman who was executed in 1980 for armed robbery and possession of firearms, the latter which was a capital crime in Malaysia.
- Kho Jabing, a Malaysian who was of mixed Chinese and Iban descent. He was accused of murdering Cao Ruyin during a robbery in Singapore in 2008, and was sentenced to death. He was hanged in 2016.
- Yap Weng Wah (born 1983), a Malaysian serial sex offender and hebephilic who had raped 31 teenage boys aged between 11 and 15 in Singapore between 2009 and 2012. He had also targeted at least 14 boys to satisfy his sexual urges during his time in Malaysia. After pleading guilty to 12 out of 76 charges, Yap was sentenced to a term of 30 years in jail and 24 strokes of the cane.
- Jho Low, who engineered the 1MDB fraud scheme.
- Jonaris Badlishah, a Malaysian of mixed Malay and Chinese descent and distant nephew of the Sultan of Kedah who was executed for killing Singaporean beautician Sally Poh after stealing her Rolex watch in 1998.
- Cheong Chun Yin, Perak-born Malaysian drug trafficker from Johor who was initially sentenced to death for importing heroin in Singapore in 2010, but subsequently, in 2015, he escaped the death sentence and was re-sentenced to life imprisonment and 15 strokes of the cane following the 2013 changes to Singapore's death penalty laws and a subsequent re-trial by the High Court of Singapore.
- Pang Siew Fum, Malaysian and accomplice of Cheong Chun Yin. She was initially sentenced to death for importing heroin in Singapore in 2010, but subsequently, due to the judicial changes to Singapore's death penalty laws in 2013, her death sentence was commuted to life imprisonment in a re-trial by the High Court of Singapore in 2015.
- Lim Chin Chong, a Malaysian teenager and male prostitute, who at age 18, murdered his 65-year-old employer Philip Low Cheng Quee, a male brothel owner. Lim escaped to Malaysia after the crime but was arrested twenty days later, and sent back to Singapore for trial. Lim was found guilty of murder and executed at Changi Prison on 23 October 1998.
- Chin Seow Noi, Chin Yaw Kim and Ng Kim Heng, the three Malaysians who were charged in Singapore with murdering Lim Lee Tin, the female lover of Chin Seow Noi, the elder sister of Chin Yaw Kim, after Lim kept harassing the elder Chin for money. All three were convicted and hanged on 31 March 1995 for Lim's murder.
- Boh Soon Ho, a 48-year-old Melaka-born Malaysian and Singapore permanent resident who strangled his 28-year-old Chinese girlfriend and nurse Zhang Huaxiang to death. Boh fled to his hometown in Melaka but was arrested and sent back to Singapore. He was charged and found guilty of murder, and sentenced to life imprisonment in February 2020.
- Lim Kok Yew, Tiong Bahru bus hijacker who was hanged in 1984 for discharging a firearm with intent to cause hurt
- Lim Kim Huat and Neoh Bean Chye, the two Malaysian armed robbers hanged in 1975 for killing a Singaporean wine shop proprietor
- Lee Chor Pet, Lim Kim Kwee and Ho Kee Fatt, three of the five kidnappers charged with kidnapping and killing a millionaire's son. They were hanged in 1973
- Sim Min Teck, Beh Meng Chai and Chng Meng Joo, the three perpetrators of the 1980 Jurong fishing port murders. Sim was executed for murder, Beh was jailed for life for manslaughter and Chng remained at large and was never caught
- Ng Theng Shuang, Penang-born Malaysian armed robber and gunman hanged in Singapore on 14 July 1995
- Lee Kok Chin, Penang-born Malaysian armed robber and gunman who was gunned down in 1992 during a shootout at South Bridge Road

== Others ==
- Venerable Prof. KL Dhammajoti - Theravada Buddhist monk, one of the leading scholars on 'Sarvastivada Abhidharma' and is well known in the world of Buddhist scholarship.
- Bhante Sujiva – well-known teacher of Vipassana in the Theravāda Buddhist Tradition
- Venerable Chi Chern – well-known Buddhist monk and principal of the Malaysian Buddhist Institute.
- Ngeow Sze Chan – Chinese physician, regarded as “The Father of Modern Traditional Chinese Medicine”
- Albert Kwok Fen Nam (1921–1944), war hero and leader of the "Kinabalu Guerrillas" against Japanese occupation
- Khoo Kay Kim – highly regarded national academic for his views on local sports and socio-political issues, was honoured with Emeritus Professor title by the University of Malaya in 2001
- Wong Siew Te – zoologist and Malayan sun bear expert
- Wong Ah Kiu – also known as Nyonya binti Tahir, born to a Muslim family but raised Buddhist
- Felixia Yeap – also known as Raisyyah Rania, Malaysian model
- Lee Poh Ping (李宝平) - Professor in international relations
- Zulhadi Omar – also known as Eddie Teyo, is known for his many lawsuits against Malaysia in a bid to officially change faith from Islam to Buddhism
- Hussein Ye – Islamic scholar who claimed that Muslims terrorists were not responsible for the September 11 attacks on the United States, just based on "suspicion".

== See also ==
- List of Chinese people
- Overseas Chinese
- Chinese Singaporeans
- Chinese Filipino
- Chinese Indonesians
- Thai Chinese
- List of Malaysians
- List of Malay people
- List of Malaysians of Indian descent
