= Autoworld =

Autoworld, Auto World or AutoWorld may refer to:

- Autoworld (museum), an automobile museum in Brussels, Belgium
- AutoWorld (theme park), a theme park in Flint, Michigan, United States which closed in 1994
- Auto World (brand), a manufacturer of diecast model cars
- Autoworld.com.my, an automotive web portal website
