= Mark Chang =

Mark Chang may refer to:

- A character in The Fairly OddParents; see List of The Fairly OddParents characters § Other
- Mark S. Chang (born 1976), American politician
- Mark Chang Mun Kee (born 1965), Malaysian businessman

== See also ==
- Mark Changizi (born 1969), American theoretical cognitive scientist
