= Oriental Bank =

Oriental Bank may refer to:

- Oriental Bank PLC, or Oriental Bank, a commercial bank founded in Phnom Penh, Cambodia in 2021
- Oriental Bank Corporation, a British imperial bank founded in India in 1842
- Oriental Bank, which merged with Consolidated National Bank of New York in 1909 to form National Reserve Bank
- OFG Bancorp, or Oriental Bank, a financial holding company in San Juan, Puerto Rico
- Oriental Bank of Commerce, a former Indian public sector bank
- M Oriental Bank, formerly Oriental Commercial Bank Limited, a commercial bank in Kenya
