= Norasharee Gous =

Singaporean executed in 2022 for drug offences

Norasharee bin Gous
- Born: 22 November 1973; Singapore
- Died: 7 July 2022 (aged 48); Changi Prison, Singapore
- Status: Executed by hanging
- Criminal charge: Drug trafficking
- Penalty: Death

Norasharee bin Gous (22 November 1973 – 7 July 2022) was a Singaporean who was found guilty of soliciting a man named Mohamad Yazid Md Yusof to traffic 120.90g of diamorphine (heroin). Upon the courier's arrest on 23 October 2013, Norasharee was not arrested until July 2015, and he was charged with abetting and instigating Yazid to commit drug trafficking. A third co-accused, Kalwant Singh Jogindar Singh, was also arrested on the same date and venue as Yazid and charged in court for drug trafficking.

Norasharee, together with Kalwant, were both sentenced to death after they were not certified as couriers or having diminished responsibility, while Yazid was sentenced to life in prison with caning on behalf of him being a certified courier. Norasharee made several appeals against his sentence, and at one point, he was granted a re-trial based on new evidence but once again sentenced to death. Norasharee was hanged on 7 July 2022, the same day as his co-accused Kalwant.

== Early life ==
Norasharee bin Gous was born in Singapore on 22 November 1973. While nothing was known about his family or background, court documents revealed that Norasharee was formerly a member of the local street gang '369' (or Salakau) during his younger years.

Norasharee was involved in several gang fights in the past. In 1998, he got into a fight with the gang leader of Salakau's rival gang "Omega" at a club at the basement of the Telok Blangah House. After Norasharee emerged victorious from the fight, the Omega gang's lower members attacked Norasharee out of revenge in 1999, stabbing him at the shopping mall Northpoint. Norasharee left the gang in 2008, but during the time he was working as a bouncer at a nightclub (between 2011 and 2013), Norasharee still faced harassment from the Omega gang members.

Norasharee was previously jailed in 1997 for drug consumption, and two years later in 1999, he was convicted and incarcerated for absconding from urine tests. He was also detained for four years in 2000 for gang activities and released while under police supervision for a subsequent one year period. In 2006, Norasharee was charged with drug consumption a second time and imprisoned for five years thereafter. Despite his regular stints in prison, Norasharee was able to take up stable jobs after his release in 2004 and 2011 respectively.

== Arrest and trial ==
On 24 October 2013, 35-year-old Singaporean Mohamad Yazid Bin Md Yusof and 23-year-old Malaysian Kalwant Singh a/l Jogindar Singh were arrested at a multi-storey carpark at Woodlands Drive during a Central Narcotics Bureau (CNB) operation. The CNB officers recovered six bundles wrapped with black tape from the motor box of Yazid's motorcycle, and these bundles contained not less than 120.90g of diamorphine. Another three bundles containing around 60g of drugs were also found in Kalwant's vehicle.

After Yazid and Kalwant were charged for drug trafficking, Yazid confessed that on the instructions of his boss, known to him as "Boy Ayie", he was told to receive packages of diamorphine from Kalwant for the purpose of trafficking. Even though there were evidence showing that Kalwant was aware of the presence of the drugs, he denied having knowledge of the diamorphine in his possession and claimed he was asked by his female boss through death threats to import the drugs, which he thought were not illegal narcotics. After police investigations, the real identity of Yazid's alleged instigator "Boy Ayie" was revealed as Norasharee Gous.

In July 2015, a year and nine months after the capture of Yazid and Kalwant, 42-year-old Norasharee was arrested and charged with instigating Yazid to traffic in not less than 120.90g of diamorphine on 23 October 2013. Norasharee was brought to trial in the High Court together with Yazid and Kalwant. Yazid alleged that Norasharee had personally met him at Vivo City on 23 October 2013 and told him to collect the drug bundles from a Malaysian courier (referring to Kalwant), to which Norasharee denied and claimed in his defence that he had met up with a colleague at Marina Keppel Bay for lunch at Vivo City. Norasharee claimed that Yazid lied to the police to frame him due to him being a rival gang member of his, and alleged that Yazid was one of the Omega gang members involved in the 1999 Northpoint gang attack, and he stated that the animosity between his former gang and that of Yazid made it unlikely that they would engage in a partnership together to traffic drugs. But the testimony was rebutted by Yazid, who stated he was not involved in the gang attack and he did not have any prior personal vendetta against Norasharee at all.

On 1 June 2016, the High Court found that Yazid was a truthful witness and hereby rejected Norsharee's defence and therefore convicted him as charged. Since Norasharee was not a courier, he was sentenced to death. Similarly, Kalwant was also sentenced to death after his defence was rejected, while in contrast, Yazid, who was acknowledged as a courier, received a certificate of substantive assistance and was sentenced to life imprisonment and 15 strokes of the cane for his crime (with his sentence backdated to the date of his arrest and the possibility of parole after 20 years). Yazid did not appeal and is currently serving his sentence at Changi Prison.

Norasharee and Kalwant both appealed against their sentences. While the Court of Appeal granted Kalwant's request to adduce further evidence to support his case in midst of dismissing his appeal, they agreed with the High Court's findings in Norasharee's case and thus rejected his appeal on 10 March 2017. Norasharee earlier argued in his appeal against the use of Yazid's testimony as sole evidence to convict him, but the Court of Appeal referred to the appeal ruling of Chin Seow Noi v Public Prosecutor, stating that the co-accused's testimony can be used as evidence to determine a person's guilt under the law and they thus dismissed Norasharee's appeal. While the Court of Appeal agreed to the legal position in Chin, they emphasised on the need for caution to use the co-accused's testimony to determine a person's guilt due to the accompanying risk of false incrimination by the co-accused, and the conviction of a person on such grounds should be done with satisfaction that the person is guilty after considering every factor and incentive of the case.

Norasharee's appeal for clemency was also rejected. Kalwant himself also failed to overturn his sentence despite exhausting his appeals against the death penalty.

== Other legal developments ==
=== Re-trial and final verdict ===
Two years later since the loss of his appeal, an application was filed by then 45-year-old Norasharee seeking to reopen his concluded appeal and to receive fresh evidence. The application was based on the fact that his previous lawyer from the trial and appeal Amarick Singh Gill, had failed to call for Norasharee's colleague Mohammad Faizal Zainan to support his alibi defence despite Norasharee's instructions. The evidence was considered new and had given rise to the possibility that Norasharee might be falsely accused, as revealed from the judgement of Norasharee's High Court case and those of two unrelated drug trafficking cases, indicating a possible collaboration between Yazid and other people to frame Norasharee. As such, on 5 August 2019, the Court of Appeal approved the case to be reopened since it passed the requirements of reopening concluded cases set by the 2016 landmark ruling of Kho Jabing's case, and ordered it be sent back to the High Court for a re-trial.

However, the High Court, on 26 August 2020, dismissed the application and upheld the conviction and sentence of Norasharee. In his judgement issued on 14 September 2020, the original trial judge Choo Han Teck stated that there were material discrepancies between Norasharee and the new witness's accounts of events during the material time. He also found that the witness to be contradictory and inconsistent between written declarations, and his late appearance in the case to testify for Norasharee had also undermined his credibility.

Norasharee's appeal against the High Court's re-trial verdict was also dismissed on 21 April 2021. Aside from dismissing the appeal of Norasharee, the Court of Appeal also did not hold back their harsh words of reprimand towards Norashree's lawyer M Ravi for casting aspersions and allegations of misconduct towards Norasharee's former lawyers for allegedly not taking his instructions to call the required witnesses who could aid his case. They urged Ravi to reflect on his use of "sensational language", which would not help ensure the best of justice to be served in court.

=== Legal challenge against the forwarding of letters by prisons to AGC ===
Not only the legal lawsuits against his sentence, Norasharee was also involved in another lawsuit. The lawsuit, which was filed by Norasharee and 21 other death row prisoners (including Pannir Selvam Pranthaman, Iskandar Rahmat, Gobi Avedian and Datchinamurthy Kataiah), was about claims that the private letters between the death row inmates and both their lawyers and families were being forwarded from prisons to the Attorney General's Chambers of Singapore (AGC), and it led to these said inmates pursuing legal proceedings against the AGC or its members for alleged breaches of conduct to protect the inmates' rights, misconduct in public office and seeking damages for any harm caused by such. The lawsuit was dismissed on 16 March 2021 by High Court judge See Kee Oon.

=== Racial bias lawsuits ===
In August 2021, an appeal was made by 17 Malay death row inmates, including Norasharee himself, against their death sentences on basis of alleged racist bias. It was revealed that between 2010 and 2021, Malays made up 66 of the 120 prosecutions for capital drug offences, where some 76% ended up being handed the death sentence. 50 out of 77 people sentenced to death between 2010 and 2021 were Malays, 15 Indians, 10 Chinese and two from other races. Norasharee and the 16 other prisoners thus argued that the death penalty was discriminatory in nature when it comes to the different racial backgrounds of suspects facing capital charges based on the alleged "over-representation" of minorities (especially the Malays) on SIngapore's death row. However, the appeal was denied by the courts on 2 December 2021, and the lawyers M Ravi and Cheng Kim Kuan, who represented Norasharee and the 16 prisoners in the appeal, were ordered to pay S$10,000 in costs of the lawsuit, as well as disciplinary action taken against Ravi due to the appeal being "baseless" and "abuse of the court process".

== Death warrant and final appeal ==
On 30 June 2022, Norasharee's 31-year-old accomplice Kalwant Singh's family received his death warrant, in which it revealed that Kalwant was scheduled for execution at Changi Prison on 7 July 2022. Subsequently, Norasharee, then aged 48, also received his death warrant, and his execution was scheduled to take place on 7 July 2022, the same day as Kalwant.

After the public revelation of the execution notices, there were appeals made by anti-death penalty activists to convince the government of Singapore to not execute both Norasharee and Kalwant and to commute their sentences to life imprisonment. At that time, Singapore was facing the international pressure to not authorise executions and international condemnation for executing drug traffickers. Earlier on, Singaporean Abdul Kahar Othman and Malaysian Nagaenthran K. Dharmalingam, the latter who was allegedly intellectually disabled, were hanged just months before the publication of the death warrants of Norasharee and Kalwant, which made the abolitionists more prompted to argue for the lives of Norasharee and Kalwant to be spared. Both Norasharee and Kalwant made two separate appeals to delay their executions but both applications were denied by the Court of Appeal.

During the final moments leading up to his execution, Norasharee reportedly recited his prayers and he, in his last words, expressed that he forgave anyone who wronged him and also gave his final greetings.

== Execution ==
On the morning of 7 July 2022, 48-year-old Norasharee Gous and his 31-year-old co-accused Kalwant Singh Jogindar Singh were put to death at Changi Prison. Both Kalwant and Norasharee were the third and fourth drug convicts to be executed in Singapore during the COVID-19 pandemic, after Abdul Kahar (30 March 2022) and Nagaenthran (27 April 2022). Norasharee's funeral was conducted shortly after his family retrieved his remains, which were transported to the Masjid Pusara Aman Mosque. Over a hundred people showed up at Norasharee's burial at Pusara Abadi Muslim cemetery in Choa Chu Kang and offered condolences to his family. Several locals even went into social media to express their condolences for Norasharee, with some who knew him remembered him as a good person despite his past and involvement in drug trafficking.

The double executions of Kalwant and Norasharee were criticized by Amnesty International, which urged Singapore to impose a moratorium on all upcoming executions and abolish the death penalty, as they argued that capital punishment was not an effective deterrent and executing drug traffickers was not in accordance to international laws and human rights laws. The European Union also criticized the executions and showed their opposition to the death penalty, which they stated was a "cruel and inhumane" punishment. However, in contrast, many netizens in Singapore affirmed that they supported the death penalty on drug traffickers due to the many cases of families being destroyed by the effects of illegal drugs, though they did show some sympathy for the drug convicts on death row. A graduate student from National University of Singapore (NUS) was investigated for protesting against the death penalty and the executions of Kalwant and Norasharee on the day of his graduation ceremony (which took place a day before the men's executions), for which a police report was made and the police would be looking into the matter. Two months later, in September 2022, the student was given a police advisory that he should refrain from such conduct in the future and hence released him with no further action taken against him.

The Singapore Prison Service (SPS) responded to the queries of CNN, confirming that the capital sentences of Norasharee and Kalwant were carried out on the same day they were hanged, stating that both men had been accorded full due process and exhausted their appeals before both their death warrants were finalized.

In the year 2022 itself, a total of eleven executions, including Norasharee's, had been officially carried out in Singapore, all for drug offences.

== See also ==
- Kalwant Singh
- Abdul Kahar Othman
- Nagaenthran K. Dharmalingam
- Capital punishment in Singapore
- Datchinamurthy Kataiah
