= Kalwant Singh (drug trafficker) =

Malaysian drug trafficker executed in Singapore in 2022

- Born: 21 October 1990; Cameron Highlands, Pahang, Malaysia
- Died: 7 July 2022 (aged 31); Changi Prison, Singapore
- Cause of death: Execution by hanging
- Occupation: Mortuary worker (former)
- Status: Executed
- Criminal charge: Drug trafficking
- Penalty: Death

Kalwant Singh a/l Jogindar Singh (21 October 1990 – 7 July 2022) was a Malaysian drug trafficker who was found guilty of having 60.15g of diamorphine (heroin) in his possession and trafficking 120.90g of the same substance. Kalwant along with another man named Mohamad Yazid Md Yusof were arrested on 23 October 2013, and the alleged mastermind Norasharee Gous was captured a year and nine months later in July 2015, and all three of them were charged with drug trafficking. It was alleged that Norasharee had told Yazid to help import the diamorphine after meeting up with Kalwant, who was to carry the drugs in Singapore to pass on to Yazid for the purpose of trafficking. Kalwant, however, denied that he had knowledge of the drugs and alleged that he was given death threats that forced him to help do the job without knowing it was drugs.

On 1 June 2016, Kalwant was found guilty of possessing drugs and drug trafficking. He was thus sentenced to death since his role was not limited to that of a mere drug courier. His co-accused Norasharee was also sentenced to death while Yazid escaped the gallows after receiving a life sentence and caning on behalf that he was a courier and played the smallest role out of the three. Kalwant lost his appeals against his sentence, and after having spent almost nine years in prison (including six on death row), Kalwant was executed by hanging on 7 July 2022, the same date as Norasharee, who similarly failed to overturn his death sentence despite exhausting his appeals.

== Early life ==
Born on 21 October 1990, Kalwant Singh a/l Jogindar Singh was a native of Cameron Highlands, Malaysia. He had an elder sister Sonia, who was nine years his senior. His father was a farm worker and later became a taxi driver, and he died from cancer in May 2021. Kalwant's mother died from unknown causes when Kalwant was twelve. Kalwant and his sister often helped their father to do farm work during their childhood.

Kalwant's family welcomed the birth of Sonia's first and only child, a daughter named Kellvina in 2001. Kalwant formed a close relationship with his niece, whom he took care of since young as her mother went to Kuala Lumpur to work. He was also close to his cousin Sukhjeet, and they both were fans of soccer team Manchester United. Kalwant left school at age 17, and started working odd jobs as a waiter, a courier, a tour guide, and a truck driver.

In 2011, Kalwant settled in Johor Bahru and he began to commute daily to Singapore, where he found a job as a mortuary worker at a local hospital. He also met his girlfriend during his time in Singapore, but it was unknown what happened to her after Kalwant's arrest for drug trafficking in 2013.

== Crime and sentence ==
On 24 October 2013, 23-year-old Kalwant and a 35-year-old Singaporean named Mohamad Yazid Bin Md Yusof were arrested at a multi-storey carpark at Woodlands Drive. The police officers from the Central Narcotics Bureau (CNB) searched Yazid’s motorcycle and found six bundles wrapped with black tape, and these bundles contained not less than 120.90g of diamorphine. Another three bundles containing around 60g of drugs were also found in Kalwant's possession after his arrest. Both Yazid and Kalwant were thus charged for drug trafficking.

After his arrest, Yazid confessed during interrogation that on the instructions of his boss, known to him as "Boy Ayie", he was told to receive packages of diamorphine from Kalwant for the purpose of trafficking. However, Kalwant denied having knowledge of the diamorphine in his possession and claimed he was asked by his female boss through death threats to import the drugs, which he thought were not illegal narcotics. Kalwant also claimed that Yazid's testimony was untruthful since he concocted his statements to make himself able to positively get the chance to be certified as a courier. Still, the evidence showed that prior to passing Yazid the drugs, Kalwant had previous conversations with Yazid, in which he told Yazid about the drugs in the bundle, meaning he did have knowledge of the diamorphine he delivered. There were also traces of Kalwant's DNA on the packages (both on the inner and outer layers of the plastic), indicating that Kalwant had not only touched the packages but also re-packed the drugs.

In July 2015, a year and nine months after the capture of Yazid and Kalwant, Yazid's boss "Boy Ayie", whose real name was Norasharee Gous, was arrested by the police, which therefore led to the completion of the overall investigations in the case of both Yazid and Kalwant. Norasharee denied being Yazid's boss and claimed he had an alibi on that day he allegedly ordered Yazid to collect the drugs from Kalwant, and insisted he was innocent.

On 1 June 2016, the High Court, which heard the three men's cases in a joint trial a year later, rejected Norasharee's alibi defence and found him guilty of instigation and abetment of drug trafficking due to sufficient evidence and Yazid's testimony (which the court deemed truthful) against him. Kalwant's account was not accepted by the High Court and he was also convicted of drug trafficking. Since both Norasharee and Kalwant were not considered and certified as couriers due to their significant roles in the drug case, they were both sentenced to death. On the other hand, Yazid, who was acknowledged as a courier, received a certificate of substantive assistance and was sentenced to life imprisonment and 15 strokes of the cane for his crime.

Norasharee and Kalwant both appealed against their sentences. While the Court of Appeal granted Kalwant's request to adduce further evidence to support his case in midst of dismissing his appeal, they agreed with the High Court's findings in Norasharee's case and thus rejected his appeal on 10 March 2017. With reference to the 1994 appeal ruling of Chin Seow Noi v Public Prosecutor, the Court of Appeal upheld that the co-accused's testimony can be used as evidence to determine a person's guilt under the law while they rejected the appeals, though they emphasised on the need for caution to use the co-accused's testimony to determine a person's guilt due to the accompanying risk of false incrimination by the co-accused, and the conviction of a person on such grounds should be done with satisfaction that the person is guilty after considering every factor and incentive of the case. Subsequently, Kalwant's death sentence was upheld by the courts despite his appeal.

== Death row ==
During the time Kalwant was incarcerated on death row at Singapore's Changi Prison, there were five other Malaysians, including Nagaenthran K. Dharmalingam, who were executed for drug trafficking since 2016. Kalwant and eight more Malaysian drug convicts (including Datchinamurthy Kataiah and Pannir Selvam Pranthaman) were also set to be hanged at the gallows.

In May 2022, the ninth year of Kalwant's incarceration, there were pleas by Malaysian activists to send the Malaysian drug convicts back to Malaysia to serve their sentences, due to the financial issues taking a toll on the families of these convicts due to the legal fees and transportation fees of travelling from Singapore to Malaysia, which was compounded by the ongoing COVID-19 pandemic situation ever since 2020. Despite the emotional toll the death penalty took on Kalwant and his family, his loved ones, including his father, sister and niece, unfailingly went to visit him at Changi Prison. Kalwant's father, who did not give up working in order to pay for their transportation expenses, last visited his son in March 2020 before the COVID-19 pandemic broke out, and he died in May 2021, three months after he was diagnosed with terminal cancer.

Also, while he was in prison, Kalwant befriended his fellow prisoners Datchinamurthy and Pannir and they became close during their respective times behind bars awaiting execution. Kalwant’s closest friend on death row was Prabagaran Srivijayan, who was executed on 14 July 2017.

== Final appeal and execution ==
On 30 June 2022, 31-year-old Kalwant Singh's family received his death warrant, in which Kalwant's execution was scheduled to take place at Changi Prison on 7 July 2022. Subsequently, Kalwant's co-accused Norasharee Gous, then aged 48, also received his death warrant, and his execution was scheduled to take place on 7 July 2022, the same day as Kalwant.

After the public revelation of the execution notices, there were appeals made by death penalty abolitionists to convince the government of Singapore to not execute both Norasharee and Kalwant and to commute their sentences to life imprisonment. At that time, Singapore was criticised by death penalty abolitionists for executing Abdul Kahar Othman and Nagaenthran K. Dharmalingam (the latter whose case was more controversial due to his alleged intellectual disability) just months before in 2022 also for drug trafficking, which made said activists more prompted to argue for the lives of Norasharee and Kalwant to be spared and commuted to life imprisonment instead. Kalwant's family also recalled that during the final days leading up to his scheduled hanging, Kalwant remained positive and still hoped to continue to live.

Kalwant submitted a last-minute appeal to the Court of Appeal, seeking a review of his case and sentence. It was heard on 6 July 2022, the eve of his execution. But the appeal was rejected. The Court of Appeal stated that Kalwant's bid for a stay of execution cannot be allowed due to him being determined by earlier court decisions for not having provided any substantive assistance to the authorities in fighting drug trafficking activities and facilitate the arrest of Norasharee, and the arrest and prosecution of Norasharee was not made based on Kalwant's information. As such, they upheld the capital sentence of Kalwant, who reportedly asked for permission to meet his family one last time after the appeal's dismissal. Kalwant was also given a chance to take a final photo of him dressed up in his favourite clothes during the final days prior to his execution. Likewise, Norasharee's appeal for a stay of execution was denied by the Court of Appeal.

On 7 July 2022, 31-year-old Kalwant Singh Jogindar Singh was hanged in Changi Prison at dawn, 6:00am. Norasharee was also put to death at the same timing as Kalwant. Both Kalwant and Norasharee were the third and fourth drug convicts to be executed in Singapore during the COVID-19 pandemic, after Abdul Kahar (30 March 2022) and Nagaenthran (27 April 2022). Kalwant's corpse and belongings were later returned to his family after his sentence was carried out.

The Singapore Prison Service (SPS) responded to the queries of CNN, confirming that the capital sentences of Norasharee and Kalwant were carried out on the same day they were hanged, stating that both men had been accorded full due process and exhausted their appeals before both their death warrants were finalized.

== Aftermath ==
Amnesty International criticized the government of Singapore for authorizing the double executions of Kalwant and Norasharee, claiming that the use of capital punishment on drug traffickers was in violation of human rights laws and international laws, and hence, they urged Singapore to impose a moratorium on all upcoming executions and abolish the death penalty. The European Union claimed that the death penalty was a "cruel and inhumane" punishment and showed their opposition to it, and condemned Singapore for executing both Norasharee and Kalwant. The human rights experts from the United Nations issued their statement which specifically addressed their condemnation towards the execution of Kalwant (Norasharee was not included), and they urged Singapore to revise their use of the death penalty through suspension of its practice and abolition, stating that drug offences did not constitute as one of the most serious offences by international standards and called the mandatory death penalty "an arbitrary deprivation of life" since it was imposed without taking consideration of the extenuating circumstances of each and every capital case.

However, on the other hand, many Singaporeans expressed on social media that they supported the death penalty on drug traffickers despite showing some degree of sympathy for the drug convicts on death row, as they cited the countless cases of families being destroyed by the effects of illegal drugs.

Aside from the reactions to the executions of Kalwant and Norasharee, there were also false allegations of miscarriage of justice spread by the Malaysian rights group Lawyers for Liberty (LFL) over the cases of Kalwant and some other Malaysian death row convicts (including Gobi Avedian and Datchinamurthy Kataiah) in Singapore. On 9 July 2022, the Singaporean authorities issued a 24-month conditional warning towards the LFL member and lawyer Zaid Malek for having shared the misinformation, which were considered as a "contempt of court" under Singapore's laws. A graduate student from National University of Singapore (NUS) was reported to be publicly protesting against the death penalty and the executions of Kalwant and Norasharee on the day of his graduation ceremony (which took place a day before the men's executions), and the police confirmed they received a police report relating to this protest and investigations would be conducted against the student. The student was eventually released with a written warning issued from the police, with the advisory that he should refrain from such conduct in the future in public events.

In the year 2022 itself, a total of eleven executions, including Kalwant's, had been officially carried out in Singapore, all for drug offences.

In October 2023, a year after Kalwant was hanged, on the eve of the World Day Against the Death Penalty, Kalwant's niece Kellvina Kaur was one of the 1,700 people, all of whom were families of death row prisoners (including those who were executed), who signed a petition to the government to impose a moratorium on executions and conduct a review of the death penalty. Kellvina stated that prior to drug trafficking, Kalwant, who was confident and resolute to fight his execution, was a father figure in her early life while her parents were away, and she had to take over the sad task of identifying her uncle's body after her mother refused to do so out of sadness, as Kellvina promised to be the first to touch her uncle after he was hanged. Given that Malaysia, Kalwant's home country, had approved the abolition of the mandatory death sentence for murder, drug trafficking and all other capital offences in the country, Kellvina hoped that Singapore should do the same thing and take a softer approach to crime.

== See also ==
- Capital punishment in Singapore
- Datchinamurthy Kataiah
