= Chong Hwa Independent High School, Kuala Lumpur =

Private high school in Kuala Lumpur, Malaysia

Chong Hwa Independent High School
- 吉隆坡中华独立中学; Sekolah Menengah Persendirian Chong Hwa

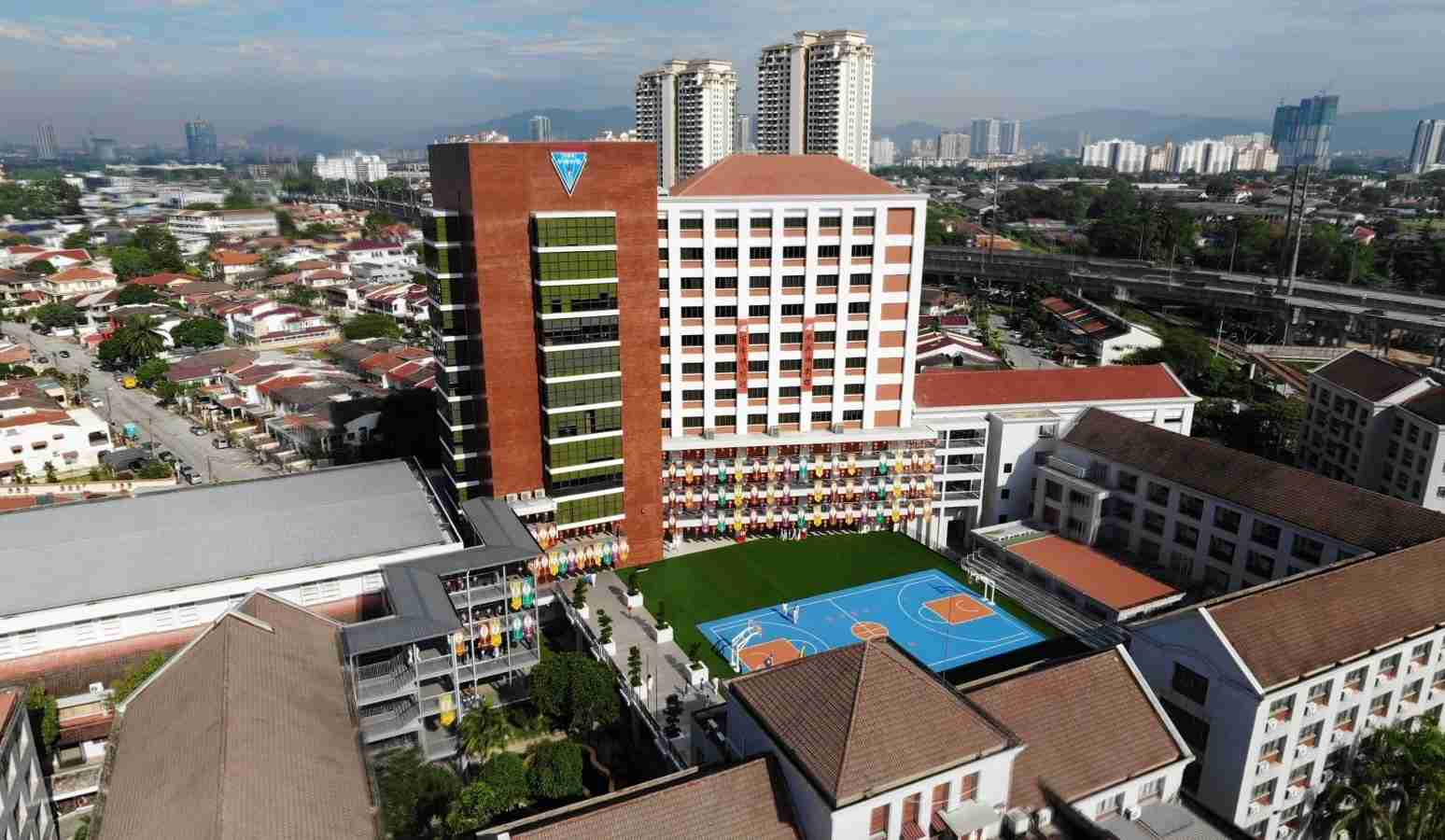

Location
- Kuala Lumpur, Malaysia
- Coordinates: 3°11′23″N 101°41′13″E

Information
- School type: Secondary school, Chinese independent high school
- Motto: Chinese: 礼義廉耻 (Courtesy Righteousness Integrity Humility)
- Established: 21 March 1919
- Sister school: SMJK Chong Hwa, SJK(C) Chong Hwa
- School district: Sentul, Kuala Lumpur
- Chairman: Tan Sri Datuk Seri Lim Keng Cheng
- Principal: Chong Chee Keong
- Staff: 423 (as of January 2025)
- Teaching staff: 305 (as of January 2025)
- Grades: 3-3 System (3 years in Junior Secondary and 3 years in Senior Secondary)
- Enrolment: 5282 (January 2025)
- Classes: 101 (as of January 2026)
- Average class size: 50-60 pax
- Student to teacher ratio: 17:1
- Education system: Dong Zhong and Kementerian Pendidikan Malaysia
- Language: Mandarin, Malay, English
- Hours in school day: 8-10 hours
- Area: 9acres
- Song: 《中华校歌》
- Yearbook: 年刊 44 (Year 2025)
- School fees: RM 690/month
- Website: www.chonghwakl.edu.my

Chong Hwa Independent High School, Kuala Lumpur
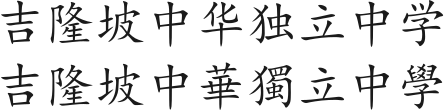
- Chong Hwa Independent High School, Kuala Lumpur in Simplified Chinese (top) and Traditional Chinese character (below)
- Simplified Chinese: 吉隆坡中华独立中学
- Traditional Chinese: 吉隆坡中華獨立中學
Transcriptions
Standard Mandarin
- Hanyu Pinyin: Jílóngpō zhōnghuá dúlì zhōngxué

Chong Hwa Independent High School, Kuala Lumpur (Chinese: 吉隆坡中华独立中学, Malay: Sekolah Menengah Persendirian Chong Hwa Kuala Lumpur, often abbreviated as CHKL) is one of Malaysia's oldest co-educational high schools.

Established in 1919 in Setapak, Kuala Lumpur, the school was a primary school. It became a high school when the school board purchased a piece of land of 24,000 square metres along Jalan Ipoh and decided to build the high school there. It has remained there ever since.

In 2017, the school began planning to establish a branch campus, and in June 2024 the plan was greenlit by all relevant authorities including the Ministry of Education and the Shah Alam City Council. The new campus is located in Elmina, Shah Alam, Selangor, on a plot of land of 10,000 square meters donated by Sime Darby Property. The campus will undergo three phrases of construction with the first phrase due to complete in 2027. Planned facilities include a gymnasium which contains a racetrack, basketball court, football field, and a swimming pool.

== Notable alumni ==
- Lee Kim Sai (1937–2019): Malaysia's former Health Minister
- C.N. Liew: Malaysian contemporary artist
- Nigel Ng (Uncle Roger): Malaysian stand-up comedian and YouTuber

== See also ==
- Education in Malaysia
- List of schools in Malaysia
- Chong Hwa Secondary School
