= Chiang Ti Ming =

Chinese particle physicist

- 張世明
- Born: July 27, 1976; Seremban, Malaysia
- Died: January 6, 2007 (aged 30); Seremban, Malaysia
- Education: California Institute of Technology (B.S.); Cornell University (Ph.D.)
- Scientific career
- Fields: Physics
- Workplaces: Harvard University
- Thesis: Linear sigma models and string compactifications
- Doctoral advisor: Brian Greene

Chiang Ti Ming
- Traditional Chinese: 張世明
- Simplified Chinese: 张世明
Transcriptions
Standard Mandarin
- Hanyu Pinyin: Zhāng Shìmíng
Yue: Cantonese
- Jyutping: Zoeng1 Sai3 Ming4
Southern Min
- Hokkien POJ: Tiuⁿ Sè-bêng
- Tâi-lô: Tiunn Sè-bîng
- Hainanese Romanization: Ciag Tì-Mêg; Ziang1 Di4 Meng2

Chiang Ti Ming (Chinese: 張世明; pinyin: Zhāng Shìmíng; Jyutping: Zoeng1 Sai3 Ming4; Pe̍h-ōe-jī: Tiuⁿ Sè-bêng; 27 July 1976 - 6 January 2007) was a Malaysian Chinese particle physicist and child prodigy. He was the youngest student to be admitted to the California Institute of Technology.

== Biography ==
Chiang Ti Ming was a native of Seremban, Malaysia. He was tested to have an IQ of 148 as a child. He displayed an exceptional ability in science and languages in childhood, writing poetry in Chinese and English that expressed his awe of science and eagerness to explore it. In 1988, he made national headlines when he skipped from Form 1 to Form 6 and was preparing to enter university in the US to study physics or computer science. He soon went to INTI International University College to take classes and prepare for university admission. Dr. Lee Fah Onn, the president of the college at the time, said he was very special as he was able to understand abstract ideas.

In 1989, at age 13, he was admitted to the second year of the four-year physics degree programme at the California Institute of Technology, setting a record of the youngest student ever to enter the prestigious university. Unable to obtain Malaysian government scholarship, Chiang was sponsored by private organisations and the Malaysian Chinese community.

During his undergraduate years, Chiang's results were also among the top five percent of students, and he was the youngest student ever to receive the Undergraduate Students Merit Award two years in a row. He was a member of the Tau Beta Pi. He earned his B.S. degree with honours in 1992.

In 1992, Chiang was admitted to Cornell University to study for the Ph.D. degree in physics. He earned his doctorate in string theory in 1998 under the guidance of Brian Greene. Then he went to the mathematics department of Harvard University for postdoctoral research with Shing-Tung Yau. His mentor Yau said that while he had done good work and had written papers well, he had trouble interacting with people and had had poor living skills.

Then Chiang began to show signs of mental issues. He returned to Malaysia in 2001, and he was admitted into a hospital in Kuala Lumpur for treatment of depression and withdrawal symptoms in 2002. According to a statement made by his father that year, he became reticent because he was too young to adapt to the environment and the work pressure of American society after receiving his Ph.D., and because he was being viewed differently by others, so he was taken back home for his health. His father also requested the media to stop giving him attention.

He refused to eat nor drink and would not speak over long periods of time. His life had to be sustained by medication. His condition was worsened on 5 January 2007. He was rushed to Tuanku Ja'afar Hospital and died the following day. His death was caused by neurogenic sepsis which was a rare complication of diabetes.

Chiang was survived by his parents and a younger sister. Another younger sister of his drowned at a swimming pool in 1993, aged four.

== Publications ==
- Chiang, Ti-ming; Greene, Brian R. (1996). "Phases of mirror symmetry". Future Perspectives In String Theory, Strings '95 - Proceedings Of The Conference. New Jersey: World Scientific. pp. 97–119. ISBN 9789814548465.
- Chiang, Ti-Ming; Greene, Brian R.; Gross, Mark; Kanter, Yakov (1996). "Black Hole Condensation and the Web of Calabi-Yau Manifolds". Nuclear Physics B: Proceedings Supplements. 46 (1–3): 82–95. arXiv:hep-th/9511204. Bibcode:1996NuPhS..46...82C. doi:10.1016/0920-5632(96)00010-2. S2CID 16435640.
- Chiang, Ti-Ming; Distler, Jacques; Greene, Brian R. (1997). "Some features of (0, 2) moduli space". Nuclear Physics B. 496 (3): 590–616. arXiv:hep-th/9702030. Bibcode:1997NuPhB.496..590C. doi:10.1016/S0550-3213(97)00237-X. S2CID 12599769.
- Bershadsky, M.; Chiang, T. M.; Greene, B. R.; Johansen, A.; Lazaroiu, C. I. (1998). "F-theory and linear sigma models". Nuclear Physics B. 527 (3): 531–570. arXiv:hep-th/9712023. Bibcode:1998NuPhB.527..531B. doi:10.1016/S0550-3213(98)00429-5. S2CID 11899738.
- Chiang, T.-M.; Klemm, A.; Yau, S.-T.; Zaslow, E. (1999). "Local mirror symmetry: Calculations and interpretations". Advances in Theoretical and Mathematical Physics. 3 (3): 495–565. arXiv:hep-th/9903053. doi:10.4310/ATMP.1999.v3.n3.a3. S2CID 15870294.
