= Phan Ying Tong =

Malaysian banker and businessman

Yang Berbahagia Datuk Phan Ying Tong DPSM
- 潘应堂
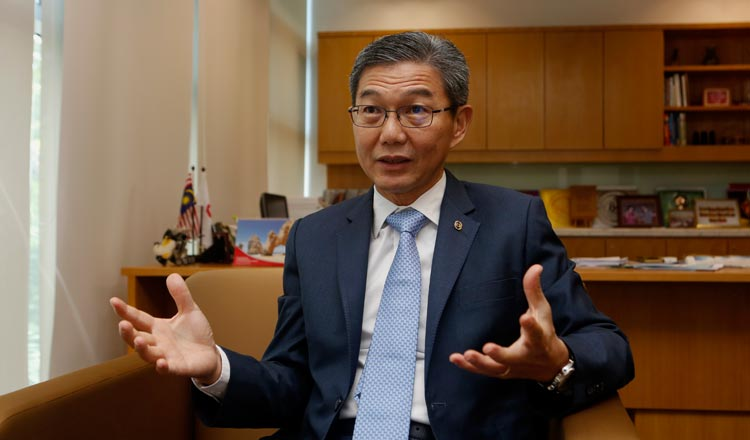
- Phan in an interview
- Born: 24 April 1962 (age 63)
- Occupation: Businessman
- Title: Founder, Managing Director and CEO of Oriental Bank PLC
- Spouse: Datin Lee Mei Kee
- Children: 2

Phan Ying Tong

Chinese name
- Traditional Chinese: 潘應堂
- Simplified Chinese: 潘应堂
- Hanyu Pinyin: Pān Yīng Táng
- Pha̍k-fa-sṳ: Phân In-thòng
- Jyutping: Pun1 Jing1 Tong4
- Hokkien POJ: Phoaⁿ Eng-tông
- Tâi-lô: Phuann Ing-tông

Datuk Phan Ying Tong (simplified Chinese: 潘应堂; traditional Chinese: 潘應堂; pinyin: Pān Yīng Táng; Jyutping: Pun1 Jing1 Tong4; Pe̍h-ōe-jī: Phoaⁿ Eng-tông; Pha̍k-fa-sṳ: Phân In-thòng) is the founder and Chairman of Oriental Bank PLC in Cambodia. He served as Public Bank Berhad's Head of Indo-China Operations until his resignation in December 2020.

== Career ==
=== Public Bank Group ===
Phan has a total of 39 years of service with the Public Bank Group, until he tendered his resignation in December 2020. The timeline of his career with Public Bank Berhad is as follows:

- Branch Manager of several branches in Public Bank Berhad before his appointment as the general manager of Cambodian Public Bank in 2002.
- Appointed Country Head of Cambodian Public Bank Plc in 2007.
- Appointed Business Advisor of Campu Lonpac Insurance Plc, Cambodia in 2007.
- Appointed Executive Director of Cambodian Public Bank Plc, Cambodia since 15 March 2010.
- Appointed Regional Head of Indo-China Operations (taking charge of Vietnam, Cambodia and Laos operations) in March 2014.
- Appointed Director of Campu Securities Plc, Cambodia in 2010.
- Resigned as the Regional Head of Indo-China Operations in December 2020.

=== Oriental Bank PLC ===
==== Media Squabble with Public Bank Group ====
After Phan's resignation with the Public Bank Group, he was given a notice period to vacate his position before establishing Oriental Bank PLC with then partners - G Capital Berhad, a public listed company from Malaysia. However, an article published by The Edge (Malaysia) might have caused some tension between Phan and the management of the Public Bank Group, as the latter quickly issued a statement to deny any involvement in the venture The Edge (Malaysia). Following the media statement released by Public Bank, the share prices of G Capital Berhad fell.

==== Founding of Oriental Bank ====
Phan started his new position as the MD & CEO of Oriental Bank PLC in 2021.

== Honours ==
=== Honours of Malaysia ===
- Malacca
  - Companion Class II of the Order of Malacca (DPSM) - Datuk (2017)
