= Zulhadi Omar =

Malaysian Buddhism convert from Islam

Zulhadi Omar, also known as Eddie Teyo, is a Malaysian handyman and sales executive. He was born on 17 July 1978 at the Batu Pahat Hospital in Johor. Due to a hospital mix-up following erroneous switch at birth, he was wrongly recorded born as a Malay Muslim of couple Omar Saim and Hasnah Salleh, while in fact he is the biological son of Chinese and Buddhist parent Teyo Ma Liong (or Teo Ma Liong) and Lim Sik Hai as confirmed in a DNA test. He is known for his many lawsuits against Malaysia in a bid to officially change faith from Islam to Buddhism.

== Bibliography ==
- Lee, Khoon Choy (2013). Golden Dragon and Purple Phoenix: The Chinese and Their Multi-Ethnic Descendants in Southeast Asia. World Scientific. ISBN 978-981-4383-43-1.
