= Teoh Tiang Chye =

JP Malacca Teoh Tiang Chye (張長財)
- Born: February 1863
- Died: Bukit China
- Occupations: Dispensary proprietor, Licensed Auctioneer, philanthropist
- Children: Teoh Hong Tye @ Teoh Bong Leong; Teoh Hong Tiat
- Awards: Justice of Peace

Teoh Tiang Chye was a merchant, philanthropist, and Justice of the Peace in Malacca.

== Early life ==
Teoh Tiang Chye was born in February 1863. He was educated in Malacca Free School from 1875 - 1877 before taking apprenticeship in various Chinese shops in Singapore and Klang.

In 1890, together with Dr W T B Falls, a British Surgeon, they set up Malacca Dispensary. Later on in 1911, he handed over the Malacca Dispensary to his second son.

As the proprietor of "Malacca Dispensary"; he stocked his shop with ample perfumes and drugs to meet demands. Prior to this, dispensaries in Malacca has a bad image of not meeting the communities needs.

In September 1890, he was granted a license to conduct sales in Malacca under the "Bills of Sales Ordinance 1886" Thereon, he was active as an auctioneer. The duties were later carried on by his sons Teoh Hong Tye and Teoh Hong Tiat.

He was also active as one of the Jurors in Malacca in 1904.

== Philanthropy ==
Mr Teoh Tiang Chye has shared some of his wealth to benefit the welfare of the Malacca communities.

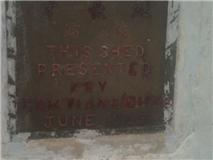
A plaque in his name

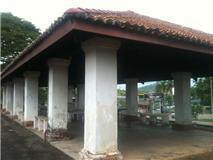
Side view of the Shade

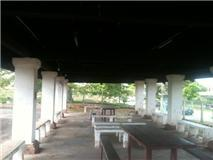
Still in good condition even though built in 1926

In March 1926, he presented Bukit Jelutong Chinese Cemetery, Malacca with a brick built shade - 54 feet long; 20 feet wide, with cement concrete flooring and tiled roofing - for public use, at the crematorium. Before this, family members have to wait under the sweltering heat of the sun, while waiting for the completion of a cremation.

In December 1927 he reconstructed 3 miles of road and 10 culverts at the Bukit Jelutong cemetery for the convenience of the public.

In July 1928, he contributed generously to build three isolation wards at the Quarantine Camp, Mata Kuching, - for contagious disease such as smallpox - Malacca. Tiang Chye personally supervised the building of the isolation ward which was built at the cost of Straits Dollar $10,000, complete with bathroom and beds. During the handover ceremony, among the distinguish guest that were present is the Resident Councillor - Hon. Mr C F Green and Hon. Tan Cheng Lock. Tiang Chye's words as picked up by the Malacca Guardian were "You were about to declare the wards open. Sir, when they are opened, I pray to God that no cases of small pox be admitted to them. They are there, however, if the necessity should arise."

The 3 isolation wards are substantially built brick buildings, with tiled roofs, measured 34 feet in length by 24 feet in breadth. Each ward had 2 rooms, each room measuring 12 feet square, comes with a kitchen, bathroom and lavatory for privacy and comfort. Each room is furnished with iron bedstead with wire mattress, a table, a bench and a lamp.

In mid-May 1930, he had contributed a sum of $2,000 Straits Dollar to a Portuguese Mission School at Banda Hilir. In appreciation, the School decided to name one of the class rooms after him.

In April 1935 he had presented the Malacca Historical Society with the antique 1/2 picul rice measure, known to the Malay as saat. This unit of measurement was in use before the Weight and Measures Ordinance came into being.

== Recognition from the state ==
In recognition for his contributions to the Malacca communities, Mr Teoh Tiang Chye was made a Justice of the Peace in Malacca, in January 1928, by HE the Governor of the British territory called the Straits Settlements.

He was made a Member of the Visiting Committee for Malacca General Hospital when it was opened in 1934, however resigned after 3 terms, in 1937.

The Colonial Secretary had in January 1934, 1936, 1937 1938 appointed him as one of the member of the Board of Visiting Justices for the Settlement of Malacca.

== Active Community member ==
Tiang Chye was a committee for the Cheng Hoon Teng Temple and President of the Malacca Chinese Lawn Tennis Club.

== Contributions to the society ==
Tiang Chye would volunteer his time to clear the shrubs and lallang at Bukit China, an act of charity so descendants of those who were buried there will be able to locate the respective grave of their ancestor. Sometime in early 1919, while cleaning, he discovered a forgotten grave belonging to a Japanese naval officer who died on 3 April 1861, on the training ship - Iskuba Kan - when it was in the Straits water, near Malacca. He told two Japanese ladies about it while they were searching for medicinal herbs near the place.

When Tiang Chye was the Cheng Hoon Teng Temple member of committee he had voiced his resentment when the British government appointed a committee to enquire into Chinese Marriage as it is seen as interference and may rob the community of their preservation of rites and ceremonies. He was also strict in using the temple solely for religious purpose and not for commercial reasons, stopping a grievance of Malacca Hawkers' meeting from taking place in the temple.

During the late 18th century, the British had encouraged the locals to grow the Hevea brasiliensis. However the price of rubber had dropped drastically in the early 1930s, being effects of the Great Depression; the rubber dealers and owners were badly affected. Tiang Chye, being one of the planters, had taken the lead on 26 August 1930 to address the issue and with a Petition to the Governor asking:- (i) Exemption from payment of rubber assessment until there is an improvement in the condition of the industry. (ii) Reduction of 3/4 of the quit rent payable on all rubber estates. (iii) Exemption from payment to the Malacca Agricultural Medical Board.

As the result of the Petition, on 14 November 1930, the Governor agreed to reduce the quit rent starting from New Year to $1 per acre (from $4 previously) and allows for rent installments where necessary. However, the Government is unable to grant exemption of payment of Rural Board assessment and medical cess. With regards to payment of rent on undeveloped land, government has yet to consider.

== Family ==
In May 1911, unfortunately for Tiang Chye, his wife, Mdm Ong Soon Neo, 49, died at relatively young age due to illness.

Their sons were - Teoh Hong Tye @ Teoh Bong Leong and Teoh Hong Tiat.

The eldest son, Teoh Hong Tye @ Teoh Bong Leong, - a Licensed Auctioneer for pawn shops and later progress to auctioning real estates -was also a General Contractor in Malacca;

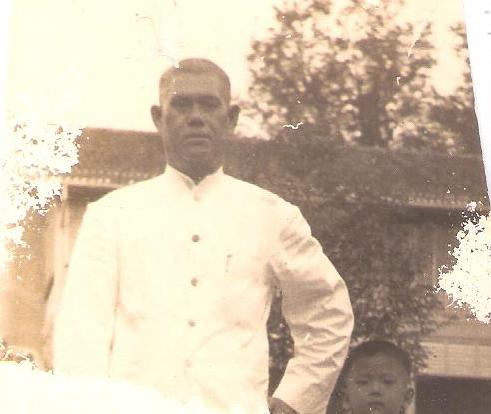
Teoh Hong Tiat and Teoh Bock Kim (son) taken at the hill background of Statdhuys

The 2nd son, Teoh Hong Tiat carried on the family business, active as Licensed Auctioneer for pawn shops and manage Tiang Chye's Dispensary. His wife Mdm Loh Geok Choo, however succumbed to long illness at the age of 35. He remarries to Ms Chan Bong Cheng neo a couple of years later. Hong Tiat had 4 daughters and 3 sons. He is currently survived by his youngest son, Teoh Bock Kim (born 1931). When Hong Tiat died on 17 September 1938, his Probate (Regd 268/2603) was granted to his brother. Sadly, none of Hong Tiat's children benefited from his estate.
