= Tuanku Ja'afar Hospital =

Hospital in Seremban, Negeri Sembilan, Malaysia

Hospital Tuanku Ja'afar Seremban
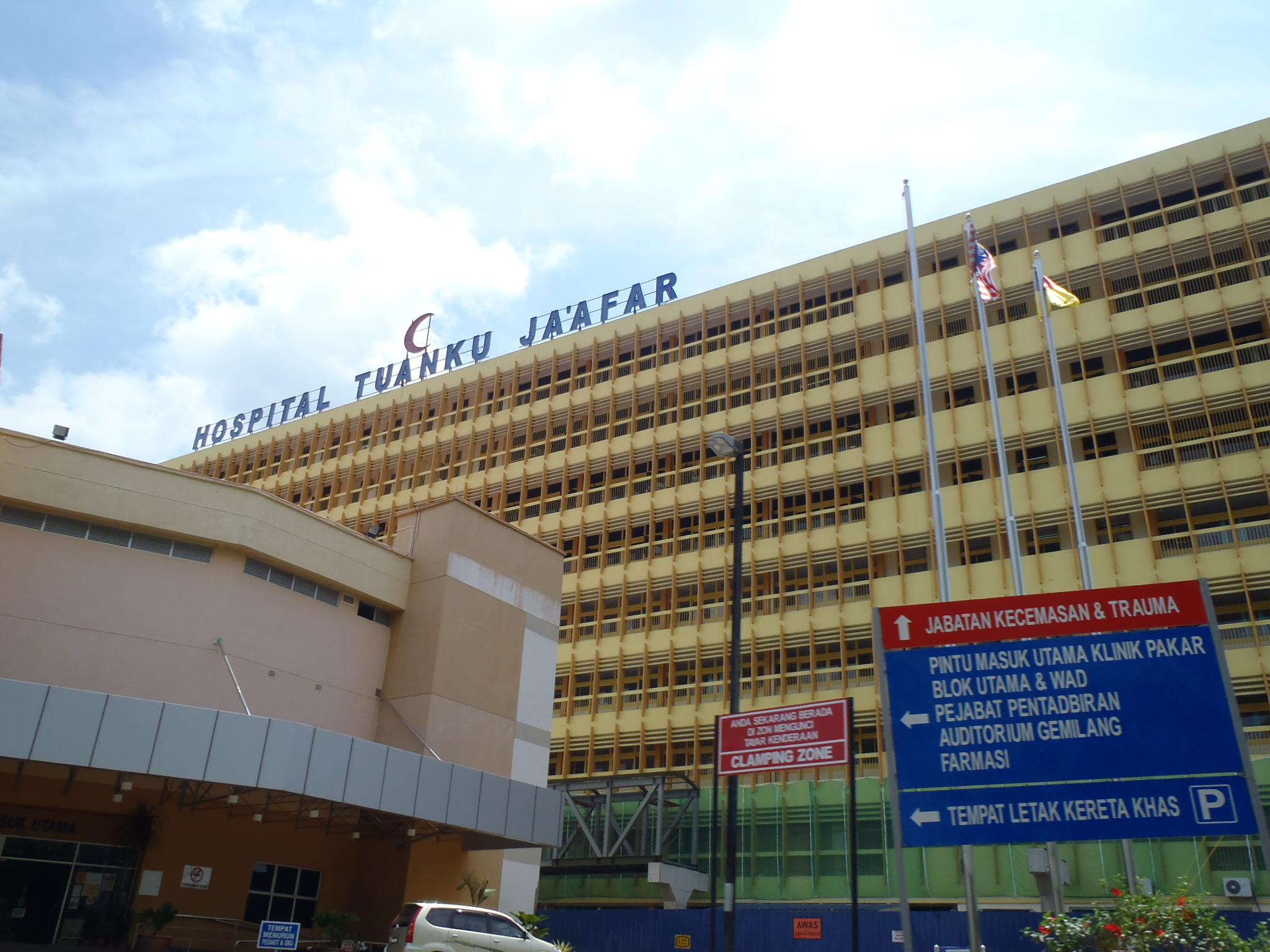

Geography
- Location: Seremban, Negeri Sembilan, Malaysia
- Coordinates: 2°42′35.3″N 101°56′41.7″E

Organisation
- Care system: Public
- Type: District General

Services
- Emergency department: Yes
- Beds: 1143

History
- Opened: 1896

Links
- Website: Official website (in English)

Hospital Tuanku Ja'afar Seremban (abbreviated as HTJS) is a major government tertiary hospital located on a 26-hectare site at Jalan Rasah, 70300 Seremban, Negeri Sembilan, Malaysia. Operating under the Ministry of Health Malaysia, it is the largest hospital in Negeri Sembilan with a capacity of 1,143 beds.

The hospital provides 23 clinical specialties serving the population of Negeri Sembilan and functions as the primary referral center for all district hospitals, health clinics, and private medical facilities throughout the state.

HTJS serves as the Lead Hospital for the Negeri Sembilan Cluster Hospital 2 network, which comprises one major specialist hospital, two minor specialist hospitals, and one non-specialist hospital.

== History ==
=== Colonial Era and Origins (1896–1965) ===
The history of modern healthcare services in Seremban traces back to the mid-19th century with the presence of missionaries and early treatment facilities. Driven by the rapid development of tin mining and rubber plantations in Negeri Sembilan, the growing population and influx of immigrant labor demanded a structured healthcare system. In 1896, the Pauper and General Hospital Seremban was established on Gun Hill along Jalan Rasah to treat mine laborers, estate workers, and underprivileged residents affected by infectious diseases.

During the British colonial period, healthcare facilities reflected a segregated administrative system. In the early 1920s, the colonial administration established the European Hospital nearby, staffed by European medical officers and nursing staff—including Head Sister Miss E. Rogerson in 1924—to serve British officials and plantation owners. Philanthropic contributions from local communities and Chinese leaders, such as visits and donations by Gan Ngoh Bee and Chung Thye Phin in May 1905, supported patient welfare at the public hospital.

By the 1930s, Seremban General Hospital had expanded into a modern state medical referral center. In 1930, the hospital recorded 274 major surgical procedures and introduced stovaine-glucose spinal anesthesia techniques. By 1933, daily inpatient averages reached 400 with a hospital mortality rate of 6.18%, among the lowest in the Federated Malay States. Due to rapid growth, the older facility buildings constructed between 1896 and 1926 could no longer accommodate the increasing patient load.

=== Modern Hospital Development (1966–1972) ===
Planning for a modern medical complex to replace the colonial-era hospital began in the mid-1960s under the First Malaysia Plan. The foundation stone for the new Seremban General Hospital was laid by the Minister of Health, Encik Bahaman bin Samsuddin, on 5 November 1966.

The construction of the modern hospital complex cost RM18 million, featuring multi-story ward blocks, staff quarters, and updated medical equipment. Physical construction work commenced in 1969, and the hospital began receiving patients in stages prior to its official commissioning and full operational status in 1972.

=== Renaming and Modernization (2006–present) ===
On 27 July 2006, the hospital was officially renamed from Seremban General Hospital to Hospital Tuanku Ja'afar Seremban. The renaming ceremony was officiated by the Yang di-Pertuan Besar of Negeri Sembilan, Tuanku Ja'afar ibni Almarhum Tuanku Abdul Rahman.

To address ward congestion and improve outpatient services, the Ambulatory Care Centre (ACC) complex was constructed and completed around 2009. The ACC block centralizes specialist outpatient clinics, day surgery units, rehabilitation services, and clinical support facilities.

== Corporate Information ==
=== Vision ===
To deliver quality healthcare, professional development, and clinical research.

=== Mission ===
- To deliver holistic, safe, and high-quality specialist medical services.
- To provide a dynamic ecosystem for professional development and clinical research.
- To foster sustainable corporate practices and clinical ethics.

=== Objectives ===
- To provide efficient, effective, and quality specialist medical care.
- To conduct continuous training and research while promoting healthcare innovation.
- To maintain a safe and conducive environment for patients and staff.

== Customer Charter ==
- We promise to provide professional, safe, friendly, caring, and quality services based on priority given to critical and semi-critical cases.
- Specialist Clinic services will be provided according to queue and/or the patient's condition. Priority will be given to children, pregnant mothers, senior citizens, and persons with disabilities.
- Every patient or next-of-kin will be given a clear explanation regarding the proposed procedures and treatments, including risks and alternative treatment options.
- The confidentiality of personal information, illness, and treatment provided to the patient is guaranteed.
- Clean, comfortable, and safe facilities and environments are provided.

== Customer Responsibilities ==
- Comply with all hospital rules and working procedures.
- Be prepared with the necessary information and documents.
- Comply with the treatment plan and cooperate with hospital staff to receive the best service.

== Certifications and Recognitions ==
- ISO 9001:2015 Certification – 23 November 2025 - 4 December 2028
- Ibadah-Friendly Hospital – 26 November 2025 - 25 November 2028
- MS ISO 15189 Medical Laboratories Certification – 11 December 2025 - 16 December 2030
- Healthy Cafeteria – 31 July 2025 - 30 July 2028
- Energy Management Gold Standard – 1 April 2023 - 31 March 2025
- Outstanding Achievement in Occupational Safety & Health 2024 (Category: State Hospital)
- Baby-Friendly Hospital – 10 November 2016 - 9 November 2019
- Excellent Financial Management Award 2018
- Excellent Financial Management Award 2017
- Pain-Free Hospital 2016

== Operating Hours ==
Day	Office	Emergency	Visiting Hours	ICU / CCU Visiting Hours
Monday – Friday	8.00 AM – 5.00 PM	24 hours	12.30 PM – 2.00 PM; 4.30 PM – 7.00 PM	12.30 PM – 2.00 PM; 4.30 PM – 7.00 PM
Saturday, Sunday & Public Holidays	Closed	24 hours	12.30 PM – 7.00 PM	12.30 PM – 2.00 PM; 4.30 PM – 7.00 PM

== Contact Information ==
Hospital Tuanku Ja'afar Seremban
Jalan Rasah
70300 Seremban
Negeri Sembilan

Telephone: 06-768 4000
Email: htjs[at]moh.gov.my
Website: https://jknns.moh.gov.my/htjs
