= Lyndel Soon =

Malaysian actress (born 1978)

- Born: Penang, Malaysia
- Occupations: Actress, Model
- Years active: 2011–present
- Parent(s): Soon Lean Ee (father); Linda Yeoh (mother)

Chinese name
- Traditional Chinese: 孫玉心
- Simplified Chinese: 孙玉心
Transcriptions
Standard Mandarin
- Hanyu Pinyin: Soon Gaik Sim
Yue: Cantonese
- Jyutping: Syun1 Juk6 Sam1
Southern Min
- Hokkien POJ: Sun Gio̍k-sim
- Tâi-lô: Sun Gio̍k-sim

Lyndel Soon (Chinese: 孙玉心; pinyin: Soon Gaik Sim; Jyutping: Syun1 Juk6 Sam1; Pe̍h-ōe-jī: Sun Gio̍k-sim) is a Malaysian beauty pageant contestant. She was born in 1978 in Penang, Malaysia, won the title of Miss Malaysia Tourism 2001. She was also the winner of Miss Cosmopolitan International 2001; as well as the 4th runner up in Miss Tourism International 2001.

== Early life ==
Lyndel Soon was born in Penang, Malaysia, the younger in a family of two children. Her father is surgeon and her mother, is a housewife. She attended INTI University College, Laureate International Universities (INTI-UC) and went on to study Hospitality & Tourism Management in Purdue University, West Lafayette, Indiana, U.S. She worked briefly with the Ritz-Carlton hotel (San Francisco, California) and then went on to pursue her interest in the holistic field. She studied in Las Vegas School of Colon Hydrotherapy (Nevada) and became an I-ACT Colon Hydrotherapist, and later continued her studies in Complementary Health and Nutrition with Global College of Natural Medicine.

== Pageantry & Film ==
While Soon was studying for a Certificate of Marketing (CIM) at Sunway College, she was nominated by her teacher to join Miss CIM pageant within her college department and won Miss CIM 1996. During the same period, she also was selected by the principal of Sunway College, as one of the eight "most outstanding all rounder student in CIM 1996" and was later interviewed by a Malay Teenage magazine called REMAJA. Soon's rise to pageantry took place during an internship with the principal of Stardust Productions, a modeling agency. She was asked to fill in the state-level position as a favor, due to a fact that a delegate of (Kedah state, Malaysia) had quit 2 weeks before the Miss Malaysia Tourism pageant. Soon went on to compete in the Miss Malaysia Tourism pageant where she brought home the crown Miss Malaysia Tourism 2001 along with the title of Miss Photogenic, and became the cover model for Her World Malaysian magazine all in the same year. She went on to the world level and became the 4th runner up in Miss Tourism International as well as the title of Miss Cosmopolitan International 2001.

== Filmography ==
Year	Title	Role	Award
2010	Savasana	as Faye	Best Short Film - New Jersey International Film Festival 2011 Best Short Narrative - D.C Asian Pacific American Film Festival 2011
