= Jobstreet =

Online employment company

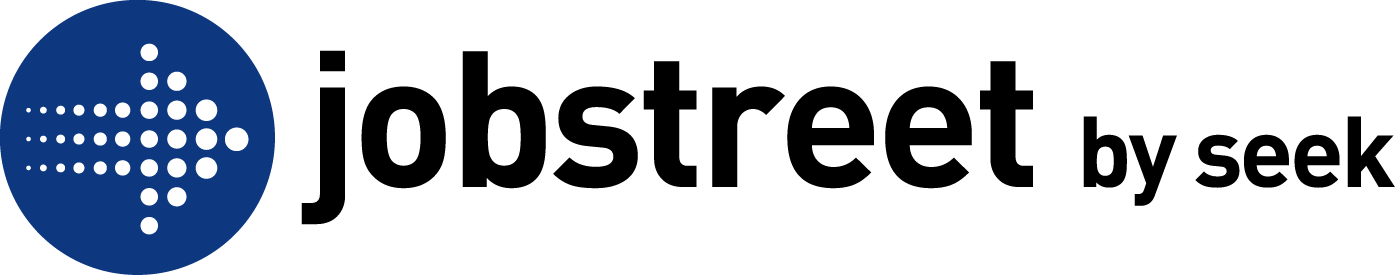
- Company type: Subsidiary
- Website type: Job search engine
- Available in: Indonesian, English
- Founded: 1997; 29 years ago in Malaysia
- Headquarters: Kuala Lumpur, Malaysia
- Area served: Malaysia, Philippines, Singapore and Indonesia
- Founder: Mark Chang Mun Kee
- Services: Internet
- Parent: Seek Limited
- Website: www.jobstreet.com

Jobstreet is a Southeast Asian online employment website, operated by the Australian Stock Exchange-listed SEEK Limited.

Founded in Malaysia in 1997, Jobstreet expanded its presence across the region and currently operates in Malaysia, Indonesia, the Philippines, and Singapore.

== History ==
Envisioned to provide an automated platform for accurately matching employers and jobseekers, Jobstreet was founded by Mark Chang Mun Kee as a spin-off of MOL.com in 1995. The starting capital of Jobstreet was reportedly US$2.6 million back then. Prior to that, its parent company MOL AccessPortal was sold to Vincent Tan, the CEO of Berjaya Group for US$3.2 million. Conservative management helped the company sidestep the dot-com bust in 2000s. In 1999, San Francisco venture capital firm Walden International and Sumitomo Corporation Capital Asia made $1.6 million investment in the company and increased its stake in Jobstreet to 30% in 2001. Walden catalyzed Jobstreet's move from a start-up to a regional major market player. It urged Mark Chang to hire executives with business experience, to expand to other key Southeast Asia countries and to trim cost.

It became a public listed entity in 2004 when parent company JobStreet Corporation Berhad was listed on the MESDAQ Market of Bursa Malaysia Securities on 29 Nov 2004. Thereafter, Jobstreet.com was listed on the Main Board in October 2007, under stock short name, JOBST. Jobstreet owns 22.43% of the Taiwanese online employment provider 104 Corporation, 21.13% of the online marketing technology and services company, Innity Corporation and the automotive portal, Autoworld.com.my.

Jobstreet.com was selected by Forbes Asia as Best 200 Under a Billion company in 2007 and 2008. In April 2013, it crossed the RM1 billion market capitalization milestone. Following its purchase of 10.1% stake in 2008 for $19.3 million and another 11.2% stake for RM70.9 million in 2010, SEEK Limited, the Australian internet job recruitment company made a complete takeover in 2014 for RM 1.73 billion together with co-investors, News Corp, Tiger Global and Macquarie Capital.

In 2024, SEEK merged its APAC employment marketplaces - SEEK, Jobstreet and Jobsdb - into a single platform that utilizes SEEK's AI technology.
