= Autoworld.com.my =

- Founded: 1999
- Headquarters: Kuala Lumpur, Malaysia, Malaysia
- Owner: JobStreet Corporation Berhad
- Website: www.autoworld.com.my

Autoworld.com.my (also known as AW) is a Malaysia-based automotive web portal operated by Autoworld.com.my Sdn. Bhd., a wholly owned subsidiary of job portal JobStreet.com.

It should not be confused, however, with Autoworld, which is a Malaysia-based Chinese language printed magazine, nor should it be confused with Autoworld.com, a US-based website of similar function.

It originally started off in 1999 as a web trading platform for the buying and selling of cars (and it is still the main focus now in 2009 and after) before evolving to incorporate more sections in its website. Currently, AW consists of an emzine, blog, forum, buy/sell sections for cars and parts, and also direct links to contacts with advertising dealers.

== History ==
Web development for AW started in 1998 by K.S. Wei and Richard Tan, owners of Lelong.com.my, a Malaysian auction website in the vein of eBay. The website was eventually launched on 9 Nov 1999 by Malaysia's Minister of Energy, Water and Communications at the time, Amar Leo Moggie.

Initially, AW was wholly owned by Interbase Resources Sdn Bhd, the owners of the aforementioned Lelong.com.my. However, by launch time, Interbase has retained only 49% of the website's ownership, with the now defunct Heritage Vest owning the remaining 51%.

In 2001, AW became a wholly owned subsidiary of Heritage Vest's parent company Hong Leong Credit. Under Hong Leong's ownership, AW soared to great readership heights, especially in late 2003, when a user posted leaked photos Proton Gen.2 months ahead of its launch. The incident was hugely controversial, but it directly led to a multiple-fold increase of traffic going into the website.

Since then, however, readership has been on a decline, in the wake of emergence of alternative automotive websites coupled with the fact that the website is left to auto-pilot, surviving mainly on user generated contents since 2004 (after half the team was slashed to keep cost low) while the Hong Leong management go on an active lookout for a buyer.

In 2008, Hong Leong finally offloaded AW to Jobstreet.com's wholly owned subsidiary, Autoworld.com.my Sdn. Bhd., who assumed complete ownership of the website.

== Editorial ==
Malaysian auto journalist Chips Yap was hired as Autoworld.com.my's editor in year 2000. He remained as editor until 2004, when he left to help start rival website Motor Trader, and was replaced by the aforementioned YS Khong, who still remains as the website's editor today.

One such member, initially known as TheGunner whom was later revealed to be Kon Wai Luen, a then recent engineering graduate, joined the writing team in late 2008, and has been actively contributing content for a period until mid 2010s. Other content contributors include Chan Eu Jin, drexchan, tedtarg, jimijamison and jaime. Chan Eu Jin is said to be the former president and founder of V-Sixers Club – a reputable owners' club for the Proton Perdana V6 formed in 2001, while drexchan is co-owner of a business specializing in performance parts and accessories.

== Controversy ==
Shortly prior to its launch in 2004, pictures of the Proton Gen.2, then known as the Wira Replacement Model (WRM) was leaked into the internet, first appearing in Autoworld.com.my's photo section, uploaded by a registered user. The incident saw Proton lodge a police report to investigate the leak, resulting in then-editor Chips Yap and some Autoworld staff being summoned to record statements in the Ibu Pejabat Polis Kontinjen Kuala Lumpur . Autoworld cooperated and provided some relevant details to the Royal Malaysian Police that leads to the actual person posting the pictures. However, despite all that trouble, that incident saw a surge in Autoworld's readership, to heights it has yet to recapture.

In November 2007, Autoworld was once again subject to investigation by authorities, this time by the Malaysian Communications and Multimedia Commission (MCMC) after members of its forum wrote sensitive comments regarding Proton and Islamic cars. Early 2009, the website was defaced by a group of hackers who managed to find some loopholes in the website.

Autoworld's forums played a role in the recovery of former editor Chips Yap’s Ford Escape, which was stolen from his apartment's parking lot. Then still AW's editor, he posted a description of his car on the forum section, which led to a forum member spotting it on the road. Current editor YS Khong also had his car, a Proton Putra, stolen in his tenure as Autoworld's editor. Like Yap's however, his car too was recovered, but by the Royal Malaysian Police.
