= Yang Bao Bei =

Malaysian author and YouTuber

- Born: Yong Hoong Ling; 7 February 1994 (age 32)
- Other name: YBB

YouTube information
- Channel: YBB楊虹玲
- Years active: 2013–present
- Subscribers: 456 thousand
- Views: 100 million
- Last updated: 22 October 2025

Yang Bao Bei (born Yong Hoong Ling; simplified Chinese: 杨虹玲; traditional Chinese: 楊虹玲; pinyin: Yáng Hónglíng; Jyutping: Joeng4 Hung4 Ling4; Pe̍h-ōe-jī: Iûⁿ Hông-lêng; 7 February 1994), also known as YBB, is a Malaysian YouTuber, author, and artiste.

== Career ==
Yang started modeling at 15 when she was a model with ADD magazine, a defunct magazine in Malaysia, which had a following among the school-going population.

In 2010, she published her first book titled Love's here (爱情 来了) which was ranked on Popular's list of best-selling books in Malaysia. She wrote the book under the pen name, Yang Bao Bei (杨宝贝), however would prefer friends to refer to her by her real name. She subsequently published three more books in the same genre as the first, young adult romance until 2016.

In between 2014 and 2016, Yang was cast in three films Zombies vs. The Lucky Exorcist (一路有僵尸), Money Money Home (有钱到笑), and Happy Birth Death (生忌快乐).

In 2016, she was cast in Lin Big Yong's, a Malaysian YouTuber, web film, Memorable Year (中学那一年). The film was well received by its audience. After this, coupled with the dwindling readership of Chinese books and writing books took up a lot of time and effort, Yang decided to switch her focus to be a YouTuber in 2017. This allowed her to a wider reach of audience and more avenues to explore creativity. By the end of 2017, Yang was awarded the YouTube Silver Creator Awards on her reaching 100,000 subscribers.

By 2019, Yang had over 500,000 YouTube subscribers, 540,000 Facebook followers, and 628,000 Instagram followers. She also had opened a bubble tea shop, which was closed in 2020 due to the COVID-19 pandemic in Malaysia.

=== Gambling addiction and attempted suicide ===
Initially, it was revealed that Yang had scammed her fans by selling cheaper designer branded bags at high prices. The scheme was uncovered by netizens and fans, and she was arrested by the police. On 17 April 2021, Yang attempted suicide by trying to jump from the fifth floor of a building in Puchong, Malaysia. On 30 April, she released an apology video which she claimed she had a gambling addiction which started when she had won a high return on a small bet amount. She then borrowed money from loan sharks to cover her gambling losses and the debt grew, leading her to conduct the scam above.

On 1 May 2021, six of her friends and former working partners released a video to clarify that they had tried to help her debt issue several times. They were Malaysian YouTubers Charles Tee, Lim Shang Jin, Tan Yii Yii, her Kalysta boss Chord Tan and Kay Lai, and her bubble tea business partner and family friend Sky. Before the video was released, Lim was accused by fans of being indifferent to Yang's plight. When Yang was in police custody, she had entrusted Sky with her phone, which contained details of her schemes. In the video, they detailed that she had used their trust in her to induce them to lend her money, and also allegedly stole the identity of a close friend to borrow more money from loan sharks. In the video, it was revealed that Yang had allegedly worked with two other persons, Malaysian Instagram influencer Agnes Ma and her partner Chris Hoo, on the scams.

Yang was terminated by Kalysta, a company which sells health products and owned by Tan and Lai, as one of their national representatives. Yang had since made restitution to some who were affected by the bag scam.

== Works ==
=== Bibliography ===
- 杨宝贝 (1 March 2010). 爱情，来了 [Love's here]. Rawangboy Workshop. ISBN 978-983-44556-7-5.
- 杨宝贝 (1 August 2012). 放学后的初恋 [After School's First Love]. Rawangboy Workshop. ISBN 978-967-5690-25-9.
- 杨宝贝 (1 May 2015). 我的人气女友 [My Popular Girlfriend]. Rawangboy Workshop. ISBN 978-967-5690-63-1.
- 杨宝贝 (1 March 2016). 中学不准谈恋爱 [Not Allowed to Date in Secondary School]. Rawangboy Workshop. ISBN 978-967-5690-77-8.

=== Filmography ===
- Zombies vs. The Lucky Exorcist (一路有僵尸)
- Money Money Home (有钱到笑)
- Happy Birth Death (生忌快乐)
- Memorable Year (中学那一年)
