= C. N. Liew =

Malaysian Chinese painter (born 1975)

C.N. Liew
- Born: 1975 (age 49–50); Kuala Lumpur, Malaysia
- Known for: Painting, Drawing, Calligraphy, Sculpture
- Movement: Surrealligraphy, Calligraphic Evolution
- Awards: 1st Seoul Calligraphy Biennale, 2005
- Website: www.cnliew.com

C. N. Liew (Chinese: 刘庆伦; pinyin: Liu Qing Lun) (born 1975) is a Malaysian Chinese painter and calligrapher based in Hong Kong. His artwork was also the first Chinese calligraphy collected by the Malaysian Royal Palace. He is also an alumnus of Chong Hwa Independent High School, Kuala Lumpur. In celebration of Chong Hwa's Schools 100th anniversary, he has contributed his calligraphic inscriptions on its cover for the school's commemorative stamps.

In 2005, C.N. Liew ‘s “Surrealligraphy” won the “Special Award of the First Seoul International Calligraphy Biennial”. In 2012, C.N. Liew became the first Malaysian artist to exhibit at Art Basel, Fine Art Asia, and Art Miami. 2016 Asian Weekly named C.N. Liew as the “World Outstanding Young Leaders Award” winner.

== Awards ==
- 2005 - The Special Award Recipient of the 1st Seoul Calligraphy Biennale in 2005
- 2000 - Works were entered into World Chinese Calligraphy & Painting Records, endorsed by the Ministry of Culture of The People's Republic of China and published by China Culture and Art Publication.
- 1995 - Excellent Award for Calligraphy & Painting - The Global Calligraphy & Painting Competition, organised by Taiwan Overseas Chinese Affairs Commission.

== Selected Public & Private Collections ==
- Prime Minister's Office of Malaysia
- National Art Gallery of Malaysia
- Seoul Calligraphy Biennale
- Singapore Nei Xue Tang Museum
- Plum Plossoms Gallery in Hong Kong
- Soka Gakkai Malaysia
- Dr. Ikeda Daisaku - Recipient of United Nations Peace Award 1983; Poet Laureate
- Mr. Tan Swie Hian - Member-Correspondent, Academy of Fine Arts, Institute of France; Recipient of Crystal Award 2003
- Mr. Liu Chang Le - CEO of Phoenix TV (Hong Kong)
- Su An Sam Sa - Renowned Zen Art Master, National Treasure of Korea
- Mr. & Mrs Ko Kheng Hwa - Managing Director of the Economic Development Board of Singapore
- CMY Capital
- YTL Corporation
