= Oriental Bank PLC =

Commercial bank in Cambodia

Oriental Bank
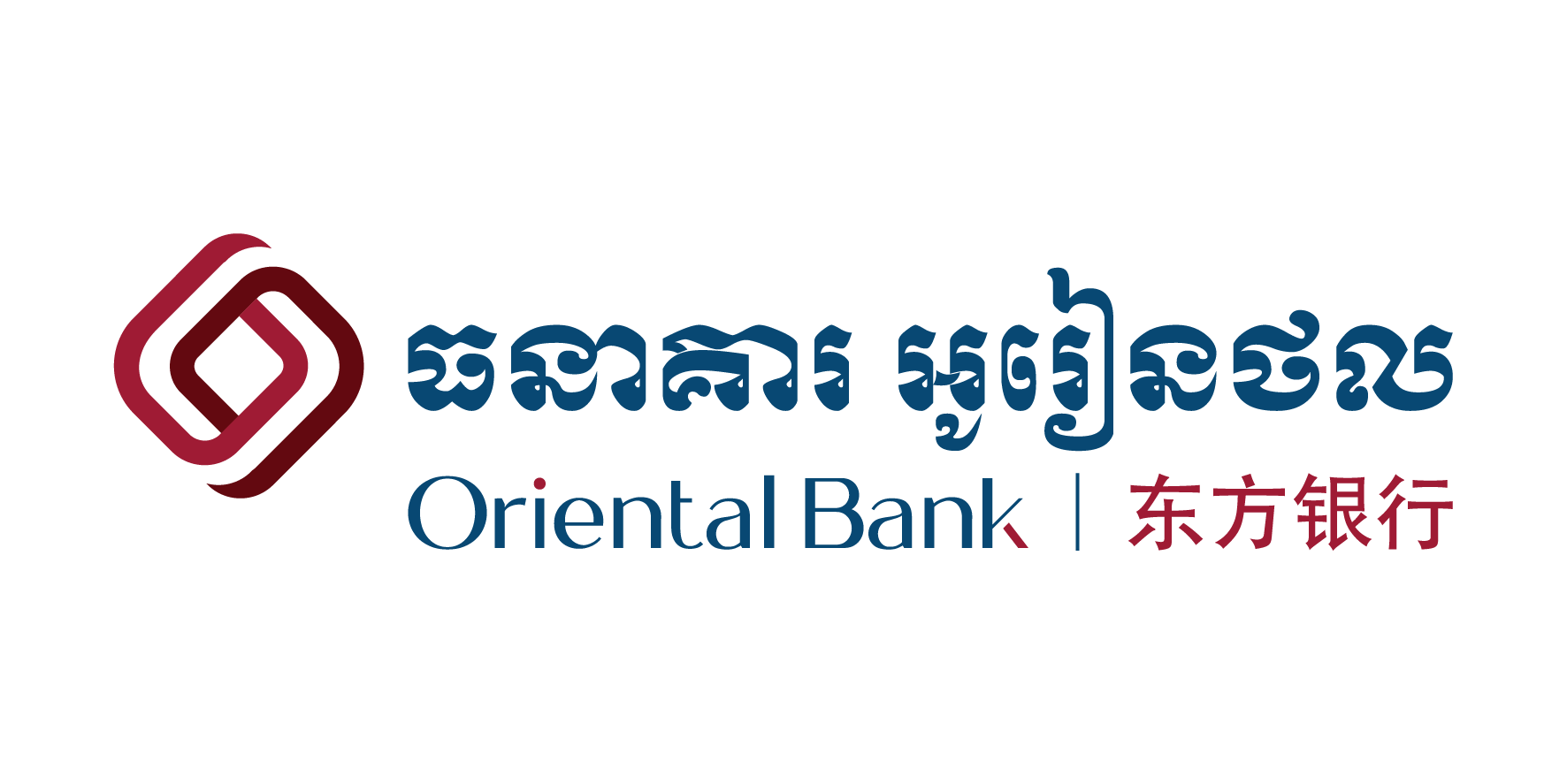
- Industry: Banking and finance
- Founded: Phnom Penh, Cambodia (2021)
- Founder: Datuk Phan Ying Tong
- Headquarters: Phnom Penh, Cambodia
- Key people: Datuk Phan Ying Tong, Managing Director and Chief Executive Officer
- Products: Financial services
- Website: www.orientalbank.com.kh

Oriental Bank, otherwise known as Oriental Bank Plc. or Oriental Bank Cambodia, is a commercial bank in Cambodia. The bank was established in 2021 by founder, managing director and CEO — Datuk Phan Ying Tong and other partners. Oriental Bank received their approval in principle from the National Bank of Cambodia on the ninth of December 2020 The banking operation license was received from the National Bank of Cambodia in January 2022, and were officially presented to them on 28 February 2022, by the Governor of the National Bank of Cambodia, H.E Dr. Chea Chanto.

== See also ==
- List of banks in Cambodia
