= Mark Chang Mun Kee =

- Born: 1965 (age 60–61); Kampar, Perak
- Occupation: Businessman
- Known for: what of JobStreet.com

Chinese name
- Traditional Chinese: 鄭文基
- Simplified Chinese: 郑文基
- Hanyu Pinyin: Zhèng Wénjī
- Pha̍k-fa-sṳ: Chhang Mùn-kî
- Jyutping: Zeng6 Man4 Gei1
- Hokkien POJ: Tēⁿ Bûn-ki

Mark Chang Mun Kee (Chinese: 郑文基; born 1965) is a Malaysian businessman and the founder of MOL AccessPortal and JobStreet.com. He is the chief executive officer of JobStreet.com, a position he has retained since the company was formed. He also serves on the boards of Vitrox Technologies, Innity Corporation Berhad and 104 Corporation, Taiwan.

== Early life and career ==
In 1988, Chang acquired a Bachelor of Science in Mechanical Engineering from the University of Texas in 1988 and later attended the Massachusetts Institute of Technology where he was awarded a Master of Science in Mechanical Engineering in 1990.

He once worked with Kendall International as a process engineer(1990), manufacturing manager (1992) and finally the regional director of sales and marketing for Malaysia (1994). After years of deep immersion in the world of the Internet, he began his dot.com journey with the establishment of MOL Online Sdn Bhd (currently MOL AccessPortal) in 1995, which was Malaysia's first commercial website, offering portal services. Its most profitable section, online job listings, was then spun off into JobStreet.com today.

Chang also serves as the Penang State Advisor for Persatuan Usahawan Muda Malaysia (PUMM), as well as an advisor in the AllStars program. Additionally, he is also known to be a mentor to Khai Yin, the founder of GoodPlace.my.
