= List of Malaysians =

This is a list of Malaysians, people who are identified with Malaysia through residential, legal, historical or cultural means, grouped by their area of notability.

== By ethnicity or place of origin ==
- Malaysians of Malay descent
- Malaysians of Chinese descent
- Malaysians of Indian descent

== By Malaysian state ==
- Johor
- Kedah
- Kelantan
- Kuala Lumpur
- Melaka
- Negeri Sembilan
- Pahang
- Penang
- Perak
- Perlis
- Sabah
- Sarawak
- Selangor
- Terengganu
- Foreign-born Malaysians

== Academicians ==
- Afifi al-Akiti (born 1976), Islamic studies scholar
- Chin Liew Ten (born 1939), philosopher
- Danny Quah (born 1958), economist
- Jomo Kwame Sundaram (born 1952), economist
- Khoo Kay Kim (1937-2019), historian and academic
- Khasnor Johan (born 1968), author and historian
- Lee Poh Ping (1942-2016), political scientist
- Ungku Abdul Aziz (1922-2020), economist and Royal Professor
- Wang Gungwu (born 1930), historian, sinologist, and writer
- Wu Teh Yao (1915-1994), political scientist

== Business People ==
- Armin Baniaz Pahamin (born 1974)
- Ananda Krishnan (born 1938), founder of Astro and Maxis
- Azman Hashim (born 1938), former chairman of the AmBank Group
- Chung Keng Quee (1827–1901), leader of the Hai San Secret Society in British Malaya
- Cheah Cheang Lim (1875–1948)
- Choong Chin Liang (1920–1998)
- Daim Zainuddin (born 1938), former Malaysian Minister of Finance
- Foo Choo Choon (1860–1921), Hakka tin miner and businessman
- Francis Yeoh (born 1954), executive chairman of YTL Corporation
- Halim Saad (born 1953)
- Jeffrey Cheah Fook Ling (born 1945), founder and chairman of the Sunway Group
- Kong Hon Kong (born 1954), founder of Nirvana Asia Group
- Loh Boon Siew (1915–1995), first distributor of Honda motorcycles in Malaysia
- Lim Goh Tong (1918–2007), founder of the Genting Group
- Lillian Too (born 1946)
- Lim Kok Thay (born 1951), chairman of the Genting Group
- Quek Leng Chan (born 1941), co-founder of the Hong Leong Group
- Robert Kuok (born 1923), founder and chairman of Shangri-La Hotels and Resorts, known as the 'Sugar King of Asia', and is the richest man in Malaysia as of 2024
- Ramly bin Mokni, founder of the Ramly Group
- Syed Mokhtar AlBukhary (born 1951), founder of the Albukhary Foundation
- Shoba Purushothaman (born 1962)
- Saleh Sulong, former chairman of the DRB-HICOM Group
- Tan Hiok Nee (1827–1902), second leader of the Ngee Heng Kongsi of Johor
- Tan Chay Yan (1870–1916), the first rubber planter in Malaya
- Teh Hong Piow (1930–2022), founder of Public Bank Berhad
- Tony Fernandes (born 1964), group CEO of AirAsia
- Vincent Tan Chee Yioun (born 1952), founder of Berjaya Corporation Berhad
- William Cheng (born 1943), chairman and CEO of the Lion Group
- Yeoh Tiong Lay (1929–2017), founder of YTL Corporation

== Designers ==
- Bernard Chandran (born 1968), fashion designer
- Jimmy Choo (born 1961), shoe designer, best known for co-founding Jimmy Choo Ltd, which became known for its handmade women's shoes

== Inventors ==
- Yi Ren Ng (born 1979), founder and CEO of Lytro

== Entertainers ==
- Aziz Sattar (1925–2014), Malaysian actor, singer, comedian, and director
- Aziz M. Osman (born 1962), Malaysian actor, director, screenwriter, and producer
- Aznil Nawawi (born 1962), Malaysian TV host, actor, and singer
- Ahmad Azhar (born 1968), Malaysian singer, musician, and actor
- Amy Mastura (born 1971), Malaysian singer and actress
- Ah Niu (born 1976), Malaysian singer
- Angelica Lee (born 1976), Malaysian film actress and pop singer
- Alvin Anthons (born 1976), Malaysian entertainer, actor, and singer
- Azmyl Yunor (born 1977), Malaysian singer-songwriter
- Awal Ashaari (born 1981), Malaysian actor, model, and TV host
- Asmawi bin Ani (born 1981), Malaysian actor, singer, director, and radio presenter
- Amar Asyraf (born 1986), Malaysian actor
- Aiman Hakim Ridza (born 1989), Malaysian actor and singer
- Aizat Amdan (born 1989), Malaysian singer-songwriter
- Alif Satar (born 1990), Malaysian actor, singer, and TV host
- Adira Suhaimi (born 1991), Malaysian singer
- Aedy Ashraf (born 1993), Malaysian actor
- Beto Kusyairy (born 1980), Malaysian actor
- Chef Wan (born 1958), Malaysian chef and TV personality
- Chen Hanwei (born 1969), Malaysian actor and TV host
- Christopher Lee (born 1971), Malaysian actor, TV host, and businessman
- David Arumugam (born 1950), founding member of the Alleycats, Malaysian musician and singer
- Din Beramboi (1966–2010), Malaysian comedian, actor, and radio DJ
- Dayang Nurfaizah (born 1981), Malaysian singer and actress
- Daniel Lee Chee Hun (born 1983), Malaysian singer
- Ella (born 1966), Malaysian musician, singer, actress, model, and entrepreneur
- Erra Fazira (born 1974), Malaysian actress and singer
- Elyana (born 1987), Malaysian singer and actress
- Emma Maembong (born 1992), Malaysian actress and model
- Francissca Peter (born 1961), Malaysian actress and singer-songwriter
- Fauziah Latiff (born 1970), Malaysian singer and actress
- Faizal Tahir (born 1978), Malaysian singer-songwriter
- Fish Leong (born 1978), Malaysian singer-songwriter
- Fazura (born 1983), Malaysian actress, singer, and TV host
- Fasha Sandha (born 1984), Malaysian actress
- Fadlan Hazim (born 1992), Malaysian actor, singer, and model
- Gary Chaw (born 1979), Malaysian singer-songwriter
- Hani Mohsin (1965–2006), Malaysian actor, host, and producer
- Hannah Tan (born 1981), Malaysian singer and television personality
- Hairul Azreen (born 1988), Malaysian actor and film director
- Hafiz Suip (born 1990), Malaysian singer
- Hafidz Roshdi (born 1994), Malaysian actor and model
- Imee Ooi (born 1964), Malaysian composer and singer
- Iqram Dinzly (born 1981), Malaysian actor and TV host
- Izzue Islam (born 1990), Malaysian actor, singer, and TV host
- Jamal Abdillah (born 1959), Malaysian actor and pop singer
- Jaclyn Victor (born 1978), Malaysian singer, actress, and businesswoman
- Johan As'ari (born 1986), Malaysian actor
- Jasmine Suraya Chin (born 1989), Malaysian TV host and actress
- Juzzthin (born 1990), Malaysian actor and rapper
- Janna Nick (born 1995), Malaysian actress and singer
- Joyce Chu (born 1997), Malaysian singer-songwriter
- Kasma Booty (1932-2007), Malaysian actress
- Loganathan Arumugam (1953–2007), Malaysian musician and singer
- Lisa Surihani (born 1986), Malaysian actress, model, and TV host
- Lawrence Wong (born 1988), Malaysian actor
- Michelle Yeoh (born 1962), Malaysian actress
- Meor Yusof Aziddin (1967-2021), Malaysian singer-songwriter
- Michael Wong (born 1970), Malaysian singer and composer
- Mohd Taufik Nordin (born 1979), Malaysian composer and singer
- Norman Abdul Halim (born 1972), member of KRU (1992-2018)
- Ning Baizura (born 1975), Malaysian actress and singer
- Nicholas Teo (born 1981), Malaysian singer
- Nabil Ahmad (born 1983), Malaysian actor, comedian, and entertainer
- Namewee (born 1983), Malaysian artist, composer, filmmaker, and actor
- Noh Salleh (born 1985), Malaysian singer-songwriter, musician, and record producer
- Neelofa (born 1989), Malaysian actress, TV host, model, and entrepreneur
- Nigel Ng (born 1991), Malaysian comedian of "Uncle Roger" fame
- Nina Nadira (born 1992), Malaysian singer and TV host
- P. Ramlee (1929–1973), Malaysian singer-songwriter, actor, film director, musician, and composer
- Pete Teo (born 1972), Malaysian singer-songwriter, filmmaker, and actor
- Penny Tai (born 1978), Malaysian singer-songwriter, producer, and director
- Remy Ishak (born 1982), Malaysian actor
- Ronny Chieng (born 1985), Malaysian actor and comedian
- Ramona Zamzam (born 1990), Malaysian actress
- Sudirman Arshad (1954–1992), Malaysian singer-songwriter
- Sheila Majid (born 1965), Malaysian singer
- Sean Ghazi (born 1969), Malaysian actor, singer, and dancer
- Shanon Shah (born 1978), Malaysian singer-songwriter, playwright, and journalist
- Shaun Chen (born 1978), Malaysian actor, TV host, and former national badminton player
- Siti Nurhaliza (born 1979), Malaysian singer-songwriter, actress, and businesswoman
- Scha Al-yahya (born 1983), Malaysian model, actress, and TV host
- Syamsul Yusof (born 1984), Malaysian actor, film director, producer, writer, and singer
- Shuk Sahar (born 1986), Malaysian actor, comedian, and TV host
- Syazwan Zulkifly (born 1987), Malaysian actor
- Shukri Yahaya (born 1988), Malaysian actor and director
- Saharul Ridzwan (born 1989), Malaysian actor and model
- Shila Amzah (born 1990), Malaysian singer-songwriter
- Stacy Angie (born 1990), Malaysian singer
- Syafiq Yusof (born 1992), Malaysian film director
- Sufian Suhaimi (born 1992), Malaysian singer
- Sharifah Aryana (born 1995), Malaysian actress
- Sweet Qismina (born 1997), Malaysian actress
- Shock System (2000-2008), Malaysian rock band
- Tomok (born 1984), Malaysian singer
- Victor Wong (born 1972), Malaysian singer
- Yasmin Ahmad (1958–2009), Malaysian film director
- Yusry Abdul Halim (born 1973), member of KRU (1992-2018)
- Yuna (born 1986), Malaysian singer-songwriter
- Ziana Zain (born 1968), Malaysian singer and actress
- Zhang Yaodong (born 1977), Malaysian actor and businessman
- Zamil Idris (born 1978), Malaysian singer, TV host, and actor
- Zen Chong (born 1978), Malaysian actor
- Zizan Razak (born 1984), Malaysian singer, comedian, and actor
- Zee Avi (born 1985), Malaysian singer-songwriter and musician
- Zalif Sidek (born 1985), Malaysian actor and comedian

== Military ==
- Abdul Hadi Abdul Khattab (born 1952 or 1953), former armed forces General
- Albert Kwok Fen Nam (1921–1944), warrior and leader of the "Kinabalu Guerrillas" against the Japanese occupation in Borneo
- Antanum, Murut warrior from North Borneo
- Haji Abdul Rahman Limbong, warrior from Telemong, Terengganu
- Leftenan Adnan bin Saidi (1915–1942), warrior from Malaya, who fought the Japanese at the Battle of Pasir Panjang in Singapore
- Mat Salleh, warrior from Sabah, Borneo
- Monsopiad, Kadazan-Dusun warrior from Sabah, Borneo
- Rentap, Iban warrior from Sarawak
- Rosli Dhobi, warrior from Sibu, Sarawak
- Syarif Masahor, warrior from Sarikei, Sarawak
- Tan Kee Soon (1803–1857), warrior and leader of the Ngee Heng Kongsi who ordered 4,000 members of its brotherhood to relocate to Johor

== Sciences ==
- Cheah Ming Tatt (born 1983), biologist specializing in immunology and genetics and a recipient of Howard Hughes Medical Institute's Future Scientists Fellowship for his work on RNA splicing
- I-Min Lee (born 1960), Professor of Epidemiology at Harvard School of Public Health and Professor of Medicine at Harvard Medical School; leading researcher in the role of physical activity in promoting health and preventing chronic disease
- Lim Boon Keng (1868–1957), first Malayan to receive a Queen's Scholarship, gained admission to the University of Edinburgh, and graduated in 1892 with a first class honours degree in medicine
- Shu Jie Lam, research chemist who specializes in biomolecular engineering at the University of Melbourne
- Siti Aisyah Alias (born 1966), marine polar researcher and educator
- Wu Lien-teh (1879–1960), a Malaysian physician renowned for his work in public health and the first Malayan nominated for the Nobel Prize in Physiology or Medicine in 1935

== Politicians ==
- Anwar Ibrahim (born 1947), tenth Prime Minister of Malaysia
- Colonel Tun Sir Henry Lee Hau Shik (1900-1988), first Finance Minister of the Federation of Malaya and co-founded the Malaysian Chinese Association (MCA)
- Dato' Sri Utama Karpal Singh (1940-2014), politician and lawyer
- Lim Guan Eng (born 1960), politician and member of the Penang State Legislative Assembly
- Najib Tun Razak (born 1953), sixth Prime Minister of Malaysia
- Parameswara of Malacca (1344-1414), founder of the Malacca Sultanate
- Raja Nong Chik Zainal Abidin (born 1953), former Minister of Federal Territories and Urban Well-being
- Tun Dato Sir Tan Cheng Lock (1883-1960), founder and the first president of the Malayan Chinese Association (MCA)
- Tun Leong Yew Koh (1888-1963), first Governor of Malacca, is the only Chinese ever appointed as the Yang di-Pertua Negeri in Malaysia, is the co-founder and first Secretary-General of the Malaysian Chinese Association (MCA)
- Tunku Abdul Rahman Putra Al-Haj (1903-1990), first Prime Minister of Malaya and Malaysia and is known as the country's "Father of Independence"
- Tun Tan Siew Sin (1916-1988), Malaysia's first Minister of Commerce and Industry and was Malaysia's Minister of Finance for 15 years
- Tun V. T. Sambanthan (1919-1979), is one of Malaysia's founding fathers alongside Tunku Abdul Rahman and Tan Cheng Lock
- Tun Dato' Seri Lim Chong Eu (1919-2010), Chief Minister of Penang from 1969 to 1990, was termed as the "Architect of Modern Penang"
- Tun Abdul Razak Hussein (1922-1976), second Prime Minister of Malaysia and is known as Malaysia's "Father of Development"
- Tun Dr Mahathir Mohamad (born 1925), fourth and seventh Prime Minister of Malaysia and is known as Malaysia's "Father of Modernisation"
- Tan Sri Nik Abdul Aziz Nik Mat (1931-2015), former Chief Minister of Kelantan
- Tan Sri Dato' Lee San Choon (1935-2023), held various ministerial posts in the cabinet from 1969 to 1983, such as Labour and Manpower Minister, Works and Public Utilities Minister, as well as Transport Minister
- Tan Sri Tengku Razaleigh Hamzah (born 1937), longest serving member of parliament in Malaysia
- Tun Haji Abdullah Ahmad Badawi (born 1939), fifth Prime Minister of Malaysia
- Tun Dr. Lim Keng Yaik (1939-2012), former Minister of Energy, Water, and Communications, was one of the longest-serving ministers in the country, and was the third president of Parti Gerakan Rakyat Malaysia
- Tan Sri Lim Kit Siang (born 1941), longest serving leader of the opposition and second longest serving member of parliament in Malaysia
- Tan Sri Muhyiddin Yassin (born 1947), eighth Prime Minister of Malaysia
- Tan Sri Dr. Koh Tsu Koon (born 1949), Chief Minister of Penang from 1990 to 2008
- Tan Sri Dato' Seri Ong Ka Ting (born 1956), former Housing and Local Government Minister from 1999 to 2008 and Acting Transport Minister from May to June 2003
- Wan Azizah Wan Ismail (born 1952), 12th Deputy Prime Minister and former Minister of Women, Family, and Community Development
- Wan Hisham (born 1956), was a member of the Terengganu State Executive Council

== Religious ==
- Ven. Dr. Kirinde Sri Dhammananda Nāyaka Thero, Buddhist monk and scholar, often regarded as Chief High Priest of Malaysia and Singapore
- Ven. Datuk K. Sri Dhammaratana, Buddhist monk and instrumental in setting up Ti-Ratana Welfare Society
- Ven. K. L. Dhammajoti, Buddhist monk, one of the leading scholars on 'Sarvastivada Abhidharma' and is well known in the world of Buddhist scholarship
- Ven. Sujiva, well-known teacher of Vipassana in the Theravāda Buddhist Tradition
- Ven. Chi Chern, well-known Buddhist monk and principal of the Malaysian Buddhist Institute.
- Antony Selvanayagam, Roman Catholic Bishop of the Diocese of Penang
- Anthony Soter Fernandez, Archbishop Emeritus of the Roman Catholic Archdiocese of Kuala Lumpur, and Bishop Emeritus of the Diocese of Penang
- Gregory Yong (1925–2008), Second Roman Catholic Archbishop of Singapore
- Murphy Nicholas Xavier Pakiam, Metropolitan archbishop of the Roman Catholic Archdiocese of Kuala Lumpur, president of the Catholic Bishops' Conference of Malaysia, Singapore and Brunei; and publisher of the Catholic weekly newspaper, The Herald
- Ng Moon Hing, fourth and current Anglican Bishop of West Malaysia

== Sportspeople ==
=== Squash ===
- Nicol Ann David
- Ong Beng Hee
- Azlan Iskandar
- Low Wee Wern
- Chan Yiwen
- Aifa Azman
- Rachel Arnold
- Wen Li Lai
- Yee Xin Ying
- Mohd Syafiq Kamal
- Ivan Yuen
- Ng Eain Yow
- Addeen Idrakie
- Ong Sai Hung
- Darren Rahul Pragasam
- Mohd Nafiizwan Adnan

=== Badminton ===
- Lee Zii Jia, men's singles
- Ng Tze Yong, men's singles
- Cheam June Wei, men's singles
- Yeoh Seng Zoe, men's singles
- Lim Chi Wing, men's singles
- Soong Joo Ven, men's singles
- Lim Chong King, men's singles
- Aidil Sholeh, men's singles
- Lee Shun Yang, men's singles
- Justin Hoh, men's singles
- Kok Jing Hong, men's singles
- Goh Jin Wei, women's singles
- Myisha Mohd Khairul, women's singles
- Siti Nurshuhaini, women's singles
- Eoon Qi Xuan, women's singles
- Aaron Chia, men's doubles
- Soh Wooi Yik, men's doubles
- Man Wei Chong, men's doubles
- Tee Kai Wun, men's doubles
- Lim Khim Wah, men's doubles
- Nur Izzuddin, men's doubles
- Junaidi Arif, men's doubles
- Muhammad Haikal, men's doubles
- Tan Kian Meng, men's doubles
- Tan Wee Kiong, men's doubles
- Goh Sze Fei, men's doubles
- Goh V Shem, men's doubles
- Wong Tien Ci, men's doubles
- Ong Yew Sin, men's doubles
- Teo Ee Yi, men's doubles
- Yap Roy King, men's doubles
- Low Hang Yee, men's doubles
- Teoh Mei Xing, women's doubles
- Pearly Tan, women's doubles
- Thinaah Muralitharan, women's doubles
- Vivian Hoo, women's doubles
- Lim Chiew Sien, women's doubles
- Low Yeen Yuan, women's doubles
- Valeree Siow, women's doubles
- Chan Peng Soon, mixed doubles
- Cheah Yee See, mixed doubles
- Goh Soon Huat, mixed doubles
- Shevon Lai, mixed doubles
- Hoo Pang Ron, mixed doubles
- Lai Pei Jing, mixed doubles

==== Retired ====
- Chong Wei Feng
- Chin Eei Hui
- Chew Choon Eng
- Chan Chong Ming
- Muhammad Hafiz Hashim
- Koo Kien Keat
- Roslin Hashim
- Wong Choong Hann
- Lee Chong Wei
- Tan Aik Huang
- Eddy Choong
- Punch Gunalan
- Yap Kim Hock
- Foo Kok Keong
- Jalani Sidek
- Misbun Sidek
- Rashid Sidek
- Razif Sidek
- Cheah Soon Kit
- Lee Wan Wah
- Goh Liu Ying
- Wong Pei Tty
- Choong Tan Fook
- Tan Boon Heong
- Mohd Zakry Abdul Latif
- Mohd Fairuzizuan Mohd Tazari
- Hoon Thien How
- Iskandar Zulkarnain Zainuddin

=== Football (soccer) ===
- Samransak Kram, Perlis FA and former Malaysian player
- Manopsak Kram, Pos Malaysia FC
- Brendan Gan, Sydney FC, Sabah, Kelantan, Selangor
- Hattaphon Bun An, M3 League club, Langkawi Glory United.
- Matthew Davies, Perth Glory, Sri Pahang FC, Johor Darul Ta'zim
- Shaun Maloney, Wigan Athletic
- Akmal Rizal, Perak F.C., Kedah Darul Aman F.C., RC Strasbourg, FCSR Haguenau
- Norshahrul Idlan Talaha, Perak, Negeri Sembilan, Kelantan, Johor Darul Ta'zim, Armed Forces F.C., Terengganu, FELDA United, Sri Pahang, BG Pathum United, Sarawak United, Melaka F.C., Harini
- Khairul Fahmi Che Mat, Kelantan F.C.
- Mohd Safiq Rahim, Selangor, Johor Darul Ta'zim F.C.
- Mohd Fadzli Saari, Selangor FA, PBDKT T-Team FC, SV Wehen
- Rudie Ramli, Selangor FA, PKNS F.C., SV Wehen
- Mohd Safee Mohd Sali, Sarawak FA, Selangor F.C., Pelita Jaya, Johor Darul Ta'zim F.C.
- Baddrol Bakhtiar, Kedah FA
- Mohd Khyril Muhymeen Zambri, Kedah Darul Aman F.C.
- Mohd Azmi Muslim, Kedah FA
- Mohd Fadhli Mohd Shas, Harimau Muda A, FC ViOn Zlaté Moravce, Johor Darul Ta'zim
- Mohd Irfan Fazail, Harimau Muda A, FC ViOn Zlaté Moravce, Johor Darul Ta'zim, Sabah
- Wan Zack Haikal Wan Noor, Harimau Muda A, FC ViOn Zlaté Moravce, F.C. Ryūkyū, Kelantan, FELDA United, Selangor, Perak
- Nazirul Naim Che Hashim, Harimau Muda A, F.C. Ryūkyū, Perak, Sabah
- Khairul Izuan Rosli, Sarawak United, Persibo Bojonegoro, PDRM
- Stanley Bernard Stephen Samuel, Sabah, Sporting Clube de Goa
- Nazmi Faiz, Harimau Muda A, SC Beira Mar, PKNS F.C., Selangor, Johor Darul Ta'zim
- Ahmad Fakri Saarani, Perlis United, Atlético S.C., Kelantan, Kedah Darul Aman
- Zafuan Azeman, Kedah Darul Aman, Perlis United, Angthong, Kelantan United, Penang, Uthai Thani
- Richard Chin, Charlton Athletic
- Wan Kuzain, Saint Louis FC, Sporting Kansas City II, Sporting Kansas City, Rio Grande Valley FC, St. Louis City SC
- Quentin Cheng, North Shore Mariners, Central Coast Mariners, Sutherland Sharks, Penang, Selangor*Luqman Hakim Shamsudin, Selangor II, K.V. Kortrijk, Njardvik, YSCC Yokohama
- Arif Aiman Hanapi, Johor Darul Ta'zim, FC Seoul
- Fergus Tierney, Johor Darul Ta'zim
- Annil Vigneswaran, AFC Ajax, SGV Freiberg, SV Sandhausen, Freiburger FC
- Safawi Rasid, Terengganu II, Johor Darul Ta'zim, Portimonense S.C., Ratchaburi, Persib Bandung
- Nooa Laine, JJK Jyväskylä, Klubi 04, SJK Akatemia, SJK
- Wan Kuzri, Saint Louis, Akron Zips, St. Charles FC
- Michael Wong, Auckland United

==== Retired ====
- Serbegeth Singh, owner/founder of MyTeam, Blackburn Rovers F.C. (global advisor)
- Mokhtar Dahari, former Selangor FA and Malaysian player
- Lim Teong Kim, former Hertha BSC player
- Matlan Marjan, former Sabah FA and Malaysian player
- Soh Chin Aun, former Selangor FA and Malaysian player
- Khairul Azman Mohamed, former Pahang FA, Sabah FA and Malaysian player

=== Racing ===
- Nazim Azman
- Nabil Jeffri
- Weiron Tan
- Tengku Djan Ley
- Mohamed Fairuz Fauzy
- Fariqe Hairuman
- Nandakumar Puspanathan
- Karamjit Singh
- Alex Yoong, ex-Formula One and A1 Grand Prix
- Shahrol Yuzy
- Zulfahmi Khairuddin
- Hafizh Syahrin
- Jazeman Jaafar
- Adam Norrodin
- Khairul Idham Pawi
- Zaqhwan Zaidi
- Kasma Daniel
- Azlan Shah Kamaruzaman
- Syarifuddin Azman

=== Chess ===
- Mas Hafizulhelmi, International Master, 2-time National Champion
- Lim Zhuo Ren, FIDE Master, 2-time National Champion
- Puteri Munajjah Az-Zahraa Azhar, Woman International Master, 2-time Women's National Champion
- Yeoh Li Tian, International Master, Malaysian No.1 (as of January 2025), 2-time National Champion

=== Others ===
- Lee Lee Lan (1944–2022) – ballet dancer and choreographer
- Pandelela Rinong (born 1993), platform diving
- Jupha Somnet, (born 1993), track cyclist
- Shah Firdaus Sahrom (born 1995), track cyclist
- M. Magendran (born 1963), mountain climber, first Malaysian to conquer the summit of Mount Everest (1997)
- Azizulhasni Awang (born 1988), track cyclist

== Miscellaneous ==
- Anwar Fazal, consumer, environmental activist, health advocate
- Irene Fernandez, prominent Malaysian human rights activist
- Lat, famous cartoonist
- Melvin Poh, media entrepreneur, public intellectual
- Norman Musa (born 1974), chef/restaurateur
- Yong Mun Sen (1896–1962), pioneer artist, father of Malaysian paintings
- Ling Tan (born 1974), international fashion model
- Noor Hisham Abdullah, director general of health
