= System Shock (disambiguation) =

System Shock is a 1994 first-person action role-playing video game developed by Looking Glass Technologies.

System Shock may also refer to:

- System Shock (novel), 1995 novel written by Justin Richards
- System Shock (series), video game series
- System Shock (2023 video game), a remake of the 1994 video game
- System Shock (band), Swedish/Greek heavy metal band

== See also ==
- Shock System, Malaysian rock band
- Shock to the System (disambiguation)
