= Shock to the System =

Shock to the System or variants may refer to:

== Literature, film, and television ==
- A Shock to the System (novel), a 1984 novel by Simon Brett
- Shock to the System, a 1995 mystery novel by Richard Stevenson
- A Shock to the System (1990 film), an adaptation of Brett's novel, directed by Jan Egleson
- Shock to the System (2006 film), an adaptation of Stevenson's novel, directed by Ron Oliver
- "Shock to the System" (Grey's Anatomy), a television episode
- "Shock to the System" (Static Shock), a television episode

== Music ==
- "Shock to the System" (Billy Idol song), 1993
- "Shock to the System" (Gemma Hayes song), 2011
- "Shock to the System", a song by Sara Jorge from R3MIX, 2005
- "Shock to the System", a song by Yes from Union, 1991

== See also ==
- System Shock (disambiguation)
