= Dirty Business =

Dirty Business may refer to:

== Books ==
- Dirty Business, by William Mastrosimone
- Dirty Business, by Ovid Demaris

== Film and television ==
- Watermen: A Dirty Business, a 2014 BBC six-part series
- "Dirty Business" (Garfield and Friends), 1990 episode
- Dirty Business, a 2026 Channel 4 three-part docudrama series
- Dirty Business, documentary by the Center for Investigative Reporting

== Music ==
- "Dirty Business", a song by New Riders of the Purple Sage from their eponymous album
- "Dirty Business", a song by Sara Jorge from R3MIX
- "Dirty Business", a song by Widespread Panic from Live at Myrtle Beach
