= Henry Wu =

Henry Wu may refer to:

- Henry Wu (politician) (born 1951), Hong Kong politician
- Henry Wu (Jurassic Park), a fictional character in the Jurassic Park franchise
- Henry Chin Poy Wu (1937–2016), Malaysian police officer
- Henry Wu, former name used by Kamaal Williams (born 1989), British musician and record producer

== See also ==
- Harry Wu (1937–2016), Chinese-American human rights activist
