= Paan dan Paiz =

- Genre: Drama, comedy
- Created by: Fazli Baharom
- Written by: Shahrulezad Mohameddin
- Directed by: Shahrulezad Mohameddin
- Starring: Zalif Sidek; Zahiril Adzim
- Opening theme: "Major Problema" by Roman dan Marsha
- Ending theme: "Major Problema" by Roman dan Marsha
- Country of origin: Malaysia
- Original language: Malay
- No. of episodes: 13

Production
- Executive producer: Tinie Arshad
- Producers: Fazli Baharom; Shahrulezad Mohameddin
- Editor: Harlina Abd. Ghani
- Running time: 20 minutes
- Production company: Radius One

Original release
- Network: TV3
- Release: 11 April – 4 July 2012

Paan dan Paiz is a 2012 Malaysian television drama series directed by Shahrulezad Mohameddin, starring Zalif Sidek and Zahiril Adzim. It tells the story of two close friends who have known each others since childhood. The series premiered on TV3 from 11 April to 4 July 2012.

The series is available via online streaming on TV3's official YouTube channel.

== Synopsis ==
Paan (Zalif Sidek) is a lazy, bad-tempered person who likes to argue while Paiz (Zahiril Adzim) is a handsome, stylish and diligent person. Paiz started his career as an architect but Paan still does not have a permanent job. They live together and often do activities together in their free time. Paan is shocked when Paiz plans to get married. Paan becomes angry because Paiz has been secretive with him. Who will be Paiz's wife?

Paan began to investigate. One surprise after another happens and the final surprise is the most shocking Paan! He did not think that the woman who would 'snatch' his good friend was his own sister, Dira (Sari Yanti). Worried about losing his best friend after Paiz got married, Paan deliberately caused various problems even though Paiz was about to marry his sister. However, Paan's worries did not last long because Paiz did not plan to move out of the house after the wedding.

Dira started to get annoyed with her brother who was lazying at home without doing anything. Paiz is busy with Paan with their daily activities and rarely spends time for Dira. To get her husband back, Dira has followed the advice of Kak Leha (Norhayati Taib) to find a mate for Paan in the hope that Paan will soon marry and move from there. Will Dira's plan succeed?

== Casts ==
=== Main characters ===
- Zalif Sidek as Paan
- Zahiril Adzim as Paiz
- Sari Yanti as Dira
- Norhayati Taib as Kak Leha
- Rafie Sumantri as Dato' Ismail
