= Oriental Holdings =

Malaysian conglomerate

Oriental Holdings Berhad
- Company type: Public limited company
- Traded as: MYX: 4006
- ISIN: MYL4006OO002
- Industry: Transportation/Automotive; Hotels; Property development Healthcare
- Founded: 24 December 1963
- Headquarters: 1st Floor, 25B, Lebuh Farquhar, 10200 Penang, Malaysia
- Key people: Loh Boon Siew, founder Loh Kian Chong, Chairman
- Total assets: MYR 8.2 billion
- Website: www.ohb.com.my

Oriental Holdings Berhad is a Malaysian conglomerate, mainly involved in car dealerships as well as real estate development, manufacturing and healthcare.

It is notable for the introduction of Honda motorcycles into the Malaysian market.

The current joint group managing directors are Robert Wong Lum Kong and Lim Su Tong @ Lim Chee Tong. The group chairman is Loh Kian Chong

== History ==
The company was founded by the late Tan Sri Loh Boon Siew in the 1960s, beginning as the Malaysian distributor for Honda Super Cub motorcycles and later cars.

The groups has a combined total asset exceeding RM3 billion, shareholders fund exceeding RM2.2 billion and Cash/Cash Equivalent exceeding RM1 billion as of 31 December 2001 (source: annual audited accounts).

== Subsidiaries ==
=== Automotive ===
- Armstrong Realty Sdn. Bhd.
- Armstrong Auto Parts Sdn. Bhd. (Mak Mandin)
- Armstrong Auto Parts Sdn. Bhd. (Seremban)
- Armstrong Auto Parts Sdn. Bhd. (Melaka)
- Armstrong Component Parts (Vietnam) Co. Limited
- Armstrong Cycle Parts Sdn. Bhd.
- Armstrong Trading & Supplies Sdn. Bhd.
- Boon Siew (Borneo) Sdn. Bhd.
- Happy Motoring Co. Sdn. Bhd.
- Kah Bintang Auto Sdn. Bhd.
- Kah Classic Auto Sdn. Bhd.
- Kah Motor Company Sdn. Bhd. - (Malaysia Branch)
- Kah Motor Company Sdn. Bhd. - (Singapore Branch)
- Kah Power Products Pte. Ltd.
- KM Agency Sdn. Bhd.
- Oriental Assemblers Sdn. Bhd.

=== Healthcare ===
- Loh Boon Siew Education Sdn. Bhd.
- Melaka Straits Medical Centre Sdn. Bhd.
- Nilam Healthcare Education Centre Sdn. Bhd.

=== Hotels and Resorts ===
- Suanplu Bhiman Limited
- Park Suanplu Holdings Co. Limited
- Kingdom Properties Co. Limited
- Silver Beech Operations UK Limited
- Silver Beech (IOM) Limited
- Silver Beech Holdings Limited
- Bayview International Sdn. Bhd.
- Bayview Hotel Melaka, Malaysia
- Bayview Hotel, Singapore
- Sydney Boulevard Hotel, Australia- KAH Australia Pty Ltd.
- Bayview Geographe Resort, Busselton, Australia
- Kah New Zealand Limited
- Bayview Wairakei Resort, Taupō, New Zealand

=== Investment holding and financial services ===
- OAM Asia (Singapore) Pte. Ltd.
- Jutajati Sdn. Bhd.
- Kwong Wah Enterprise Sdn. Bhd.
- North Malaya Engineers Overseas Sdn. Bhd.
- Selasih Permata Sdn. Bhd.
- Syarikat Oriental Credit Berhad
- Unique Mix (Singapore) Pte. Ltd.
- Oriental Asia (Mauritius) Pte. Ltd.
- Oriental Boon Siew (Mauritius) Pte. Ltd.
- OBS (Singapore) Pte. Ltd.
- Oriental International (Mauritius) Pte. Ltd.

=== Plantation ===
- Oriental Rubber & Palm Oil Sdn. Berhad
- PT Bumi Sawit Sukses Pratama
- PT Gunung Maras Lestari
- PT Gunungsawit Binalestari
- PT Surya Agro Persada
- PT Dapo Agro Makmur
- PT Gunung Sawit Selatan Lestari
- PT Pratama Palm Abadi
- PT Sumatera Sawit Lestari

=== Plastic products ===
- Kasai Teck See (Malaysia) Sdn Bhd
- Armstrong Industries Sdn. Bhd.
- Compounding & Colouring Sdn. Bhd.
- Dragon Frontier Sdn. Bhd.
- Lipro Mold Engineering Sdn. Bhd.
- Oriental Industries (Wuxi) Co., Ltd.
- Oriental Nichinan Design Engineering Sdn. Bhd.
- Oriental San Industries Sdn. Bhd.
- Teck See Plastics Sdn. Bhd. (Shah Alam Branch)
- Teck See Plastics Sdn. Bhd. (Bangi Branch)

=== Investment properties and trading of building material products ===
- Oriental Boon Siew (M) Sdn. Bhd.
- OAM (Aust) Pty Ltd
- Oriental Asia (Aust.) Pty Ltd
- Kenanga Mekar Sdn. Bhd.
- Konkrit Utara Sdn. Bhd.
- Lipro Trading Sdn. Bhd.
- North Malaya (Xiamen) Steel Co., Ltd.
- North Malaya Engineers Trading Company Sdn. Bhd.
- Oriental Realty Sdn. Bhd.
- Simen Utara Sdn. Bhd.
- Ultra Green Sdn. Bhd.
- Unique Mix Sdn. Bhd.
- Unique Mix (Penang) Sdn. Bhd.
- Unique Pave Sdn. Bhd.
