= Ang Lai Soon =

- Born: Sarawak, Malaysia
- Occupation: Businessman

Datuk Seri Ang Lai Soon PSD SPMJ PNBS DPMJ AMN PBJ PGBK CStJ FRNS is a Malaysian philanthropist, charity director, social and environmental campaigner, and businessman from Kuching, Sarawak. He is the chair, Commander, and founder of St John Ambulance Sarawak branch of the international first aid charity. He is also President and founder of Sarawak's Cheshire Home, encouraging disabled people to move towards independent living. He is a member of the Order of St John as well as holding a wide range of honours and titles.

== Life and work ==
Ang Lai Soon (later Dato’ Sri Ang Lai Soon) was born in Sarawak. In the years after the Second World War, British officers rented premises from Ang Lai Soon's father, and from their periodicals and newspapers he first learnt about the activities of the St John Ambulance Brigade, as it was then known, and about "the bravery and dedication of the first aiders and brigade members during the war years." In 1971 he began petitioning to launch a Sarawak branch of St John within the now independent Malaysia. Permission was granted and the following year Ang Lai Soon was confirmed as Commissioner. However, over the years, the organisation's activities have declined over the years and now confined only to Kuching and the surrounding areas. The Sarawak Cheshire Home was founded with the goal of "serving the community by caring for as many of the physically handicapped in our community that our facilities can accommodate" and lately supporting "The Zero Reject poIicy ... starting 2019 – to ensure that children with disabilities are no longer rejected from attending primary schools.

== Honours and achievements ==
Datuk Seri Ang Lai Soon is a Knight Commander of the Order of Loyalty to the Royal Family of Malaysia, a Knight Grand Commander of the Order of the Crown of Johor, a Knight Commander of the Most Illustrious Order of the Star of Hornbill Sarawak and a Commander of the Order of St. John, in addition to a number of national and international medals and awards. As a social activist he has received attention for various campaigns: appealing for continued social multicultural cohesion, for compulsory CPR teaching in schools, and environmental crisis and deforestation.

== See also ==
- Choong Chin Liang
