= Rindu Awak Separuh Nyawa =

2021 Malaysian television series

- Promotional poster
- Genre: Melodrama; Romance
- Created by: SR One Sdn Bhd
- Based on: Rindu Awak Separuh Nyawa by Siti Rosmizah
- Written by: Rozid Rashid; Amka Ahmad
- Directed by: Along Kamaluddin
- Starring: Uqasha Senrose; Shukri Yahaya; Marsha Milan
- Opening theme: Rindu Separuh Nyawa - Naqiu & Vanessa Reynauld
- Ending theme: Rindu Separuh Nyawa - Naqiu & Vanessa Reynauld
- Country of origin: Malaysia
- Original language: Malay
- No. of episodes: 48

Production
- Producers: Siti Rosmizah Semail; Mazelan Abdul Manan
- Running time: 41 - 43 minutes
- Production company: SR One Sdn Bhd

Original release
- Network: Astro Ria (Slot Megadrama)
- Release: 23 March – 10 June 2021

Rindu Awak Separuh Nyawa (English: You're Half of My Life) is a 2021 Malaysian television series adaptation of a novel of the same name by Siti Rosmizah Semail. It was aired on Astro Ria, every Monday to Thursday, 22:00.pm that was broadcast on March 23, 2021.

== Synopsis ==
Kasih Maisara (Uqasha Senrose) harbors a grudge against her father, Dato' Raqib (Khairil Anwar Aman), because she feels that Dato' Raqib is the cause of her mother's death. Because of that revenge, Maisara has used Aidil (Fizo Omar), the son of her father's best friend as a scapegoat in her father's embarrassing plan. Maisara pretends to be in love with Aidil and cancels the engagement ceremony when it is about to take place. Aidil was disappointed but he accepted Maisara's decision because his feelings of love are still there for the arrogant girl.

In another incident, Maisara almost hit Nazril Nazim (Shukri Yahaya) who was riding a motorcycle. A small argument broke out when the two of them met for the first time. Their second meeting was when Nazril contacted Maisara to hand over his best friend Aidil's letter of trust, not knowing that Kasih Maisara who had received the statement was the same woman he spoke to earlier. When they met, once again Nazril reprimanded Maisara's arrogance. Nazril is the only man who dares to rebuke Maisara's bad behavior. His ego was teased by Nazril's remark. Nazril's remark was heard by Maisara's enemy, Sally (Fiza Thomas) who then challenged the girl to become Nazril's wife. Maisara arrogantly agreed to make Nazril Nazim the victim of Maisara's stupid bet without her knowledge.

Various ways that Maisara used to approach Nazril. Unbeknownst to Maisara, Nazril's family has chosen Nurul Huda (Marsha Milan), a girl from Nazril's village as a potential wife for Nazril and they will be together after they both finish school. Nurul Huda is also Maisara's roommate whom she hates very much. But an unexpected incident happened, Nazril opened his heart to make Maisara his wife. Nurul Huda who really loves Nazril is disappointed. Humans are not perfect and make mistakes. While living and learning, Nazril's sincerity showering himself with love made him realize. However, as their love begins to blossom, Nazril realizes that their marriage is just a 'bet' for Maisara, and he leaves with a broken heart. Maisara who is dreaming of love is waiting for her husband to return but Nazril doesn't arrive, is that the end of their love story?

== Cast ==
=== Main ===
- Uqasha Senrose as Kasih Maisara
- Shukri Yahaya as Nazril Nazim
- Marsha Milan as Nurul Huda

=== Supporting ===
- Aida Khalida as Puan Norida
- Norreen Iman as Qistina
- Ikhlas Jalil as Izuddin
- Fizo Omar as Aidil
- Rahim Jailani as Dato' Halim
- Khaty Azian as Datin Khadijah
- Khairil Anwar Aman as Dato' Raqib
- Fareez Ridzwan as Agil
- Noorkhiriah as Munah
- Aleza Shadan as Esah
- Fauzi Nawawi as Kasim
- Farouk Hussain as Kader Salim
- Fiza Thomas as Salina a.k.a. Sally
- Munira Mohd Iwan as Azminda
- Mak Wan as Mak Cik Bibah
- Fareez Fauzi as Malik
- Lisdawati as Datin Shidah
- Balkisyh Semundur Khan as Jah Kelip
- Silfeny Osman as Anis

== Soundtrack ==
- Rindu Separuh Nyawa - Naqiu & Vanessa Reynauld
- Bimbang - Marsha Milan
- Kucu Kuca - Lia Aziz
- Pudar - Indah Ruhaila
- Kesudahan Kita - Marsha Milan
- Merindu - Izaan
- Setinggi Syurga - Khai Bahar & Inteam
- Vroom Vroom - Nabila Razali
- Angkara - Siti Nordiana
- Ilusi - Tree Hill
- Jannah - Ikhwan Fatanna

== Viewership ==
This series achieved commercial success and recorded the highest Malay drama rating for 2021 with a total of 16.9 million digital views.
