= Zamrose Mohd Zain =

28th Chief of Army (Malaysia)

Yang Berbahagia General (Rtd) Tan Sri Dato' Seri Zamrose Mohd Zain PGAT PSM PSD SPMS DPPN SPDK DGSM SSNS PNBS DCSM PSAT DIMP DPNS PAT JMN JSM KAT KMN KSD AMS BCK PPS PPA PJM
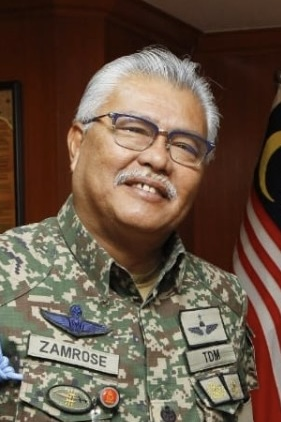
- Zamrose in 2023

28th Chief of Army
- In office 11 June 2020 – 22 March 2023
- Minister: Ismail Sabri Yaakob; Hishamuddin Hussein; Mohamad Hasan
- Preceded by: Ahmad Hasbullah Mohd Nawawi
- Succeeded by: Mohammad Ab Rahman

Personal details
- Born: 22 September 1962 (age 64) Seremban, Negeri Sembilan, Federation of Malaya (now Malaysia)
- Spouse: Zainuriah Mustapha
- Education: Royal Military College, Kuala Lumpur; University of Malaya; National University of Malaysia

Military service
- Allegiance: Malaysia
- Branch/service: Malaysian Army
- Years of service: 1981–2023
- Rank: General
- Unit: Royal Malay Regiment
- Battles/wars: Communist insurgency in Malaysia (1968–1989) International Monitoring Team

Zamrose bin Mohd Zain (born 22 September 1962 in Seremban, Negeri Sembilan) is a Malaysian General who served as 28th Chief of Malaysian Army.

== Honours ==
- Malaysia
  - Commander of the Order of Loyalty to the Crown of Malaysia (PSM) – Tan Sri (2020)
  - Commander of the Order of Loyalty to the Royal Family of Malaysia (PSD) – Datuk (2019)
  - Companion of the Order of the Defender of the Realm (JMN) (2015)
  - Companion of the Order of Loyalty to the Crown of Malaysia (JSM) (2011)
  - Officer of the Order of the Defender of the Realm (KMN) (2003)
  - Officer of the Order of Loyalty to the Royal Family of Malaysia (KSD) (1994)
  - Recipient of the Loyal Service Medal (PPS)
  - Recipient of the General Service Medal (PPA)
  - Recipient of the 9th Yang di-Pertuan Agong Installation Medal (1989)
  - Recipient of the 10th Yang di-Pertuan Agong Installation Medal (1994)
  - Recipient of the 11th Yang di-Pertuan Agong Installation Medal (1999)
  - Recipient of the 12th Yang di-Pertuan Agong Installation Medal (2002)
  - Recipient of the 13th Yang di-Pertuan Agong Installation Medal (2007)
  - Recipient of the 14th Yang di-Pertuan Agong Installation Medal (2012)
  - Recipient of the 15th Yang di-Pertuan Agong Installation Medal (2017)
  - Recipient of the 16th Yang di-Pertuan Agong Installation Medal (2019)
- Malaysian Armed Forces
  - Courageous Commander of The Most Gallant Order of Military Service (PGAT) (2021)
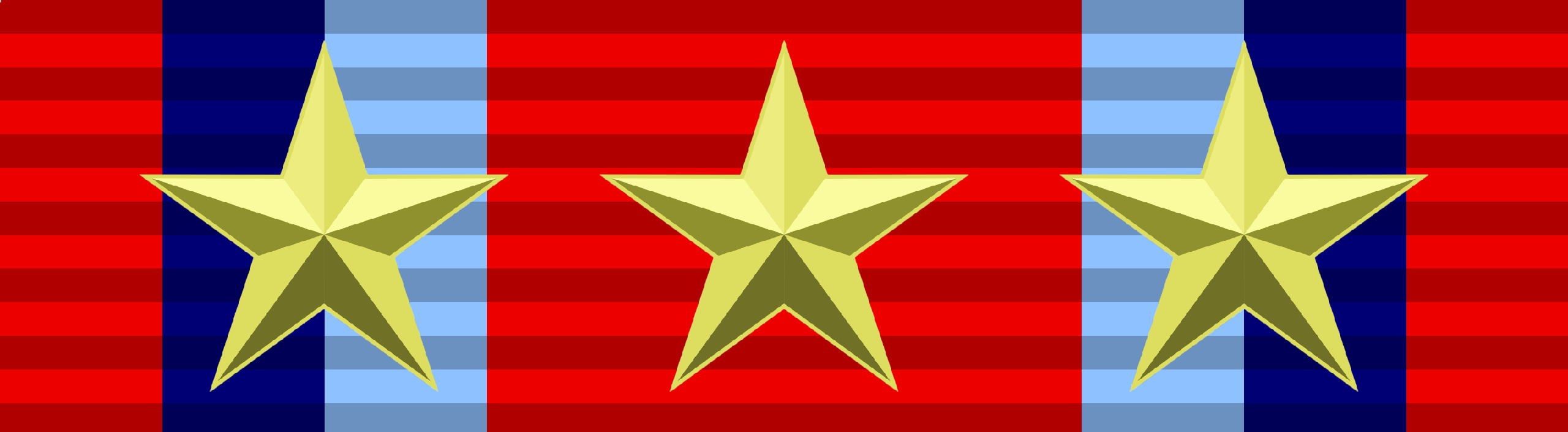
  - Loyal Commander of the Most Gallant Order of Military Service (PSAT)
  - Warrior of the Most Gallant Order of Military Service (PAT)
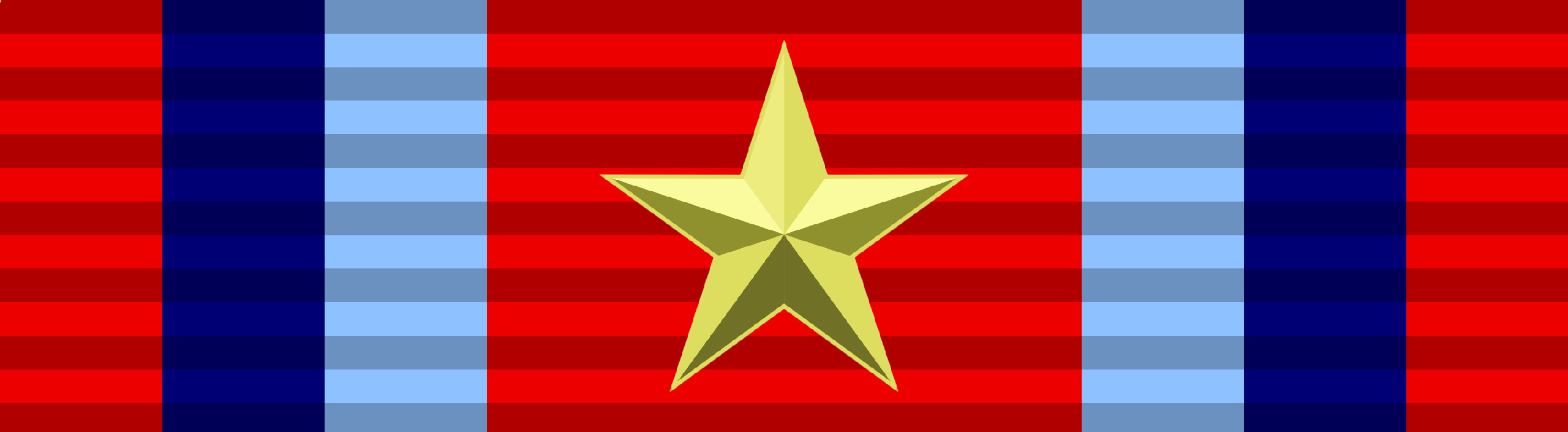
  - Officer of the Most Gallant Order of Military Service (KAT)
  - Recipient of the Malaysian Service Medal (PJM)
- Kedah
  - State of Kedah Distinguished Service Star (BCK) (2002)
  - Recipient of the Sultan Sallehuddin Installation Medal (2018)
- Malacca
  - Grand Commander of the Exalted Order of Malacca (DGSM) – Datuk Seri (2021)
  - Knight Commander of the Exalted Order of Malacca (DCSM) – Datuk Wira (2015)
- Negeri Sembilan
  - Knight Grand Companion of the Order of Loyalty to Negeri Sembilan (SSNS) – Dato' Seri (2022)
  - Knight Commander of the Order of Loyalty to Negeri Sembilan (DPNS) – Dato' (2020)
- Pahang
  - Knight Companion of the Order of the Crown of Pahang (DIMP) – Dato' (2009)
- Penang
  - Knight Commander of the Order of the Defender of State (DPPN) – Dato' Seri (2020)
- Sabah
  - Grand Commander of the Order of Kinabalu (SPDK) – Datuk Seri Panglima (2021)
- Sarawak
  - Knight Commander of the Most Exalted Order of the Star of Sarawak (PNBS) – Dato Sri (2022)
- Selangor
  - Knight Grand Commander of the Order of the Crown of Selangor (SPMS) – Dato' Seri (2020)
  - Member of the Order of the Crown of Selangor (AMS) (2004)
  - Recipient of the Sultan Salahuddin Silver Jubilee Medal (1985)
  - Recipient of the Sultan Sharafuddin Coronation Medal (2003)
