= Dell Akbar Khan =

Malaysian footballer

Yang Berbahagia Datuk Dell Akbar Khan PSD DPMS DSAP DIMP JSD PSPP AMN AMP ASA BSD PPA
- ديل اکبر خان

Personal details
- Born: Dell Akbar Khan bin Hyder Khan; 25 December 1952 Bangsar, Malaysia
Association football career
- Position: Right-back
Senior career*
Years	Team	Apps	(Gls)
- PDRM FA
- Selangor FA
International career
1968–1973	Malaysia		
- * Club domestic league appearances and goals

Dell Akbar Khan bin Hyder Khan commonly known as Dell Akbar Khan is a Malaysian former football player, football administrator and former civil servant. He played for the Malaysian national football team, and also played for PDRM FA and Selangor FA in Malaysia's domestic competition in the 1960s and 1970s.

Dell played for Malaysia from 1968 to 1973, and played in the qualification games for 1972 Summer Olympics, although he was not selected in the national team for the finals in Munich.

After retiring from playing, he holds various positions in Football Association of Malaysia (FAM) such as Malaysia senior team manager in the late 1990s, and FAM's Secretary-General from 2000 until 2005. He was also selected as FIFA venue security officer for the 2010 FIFA World Cup in South Africa.

By profession, Dell is a police officer and enrolled in Royal Malaysia Police from 1970, until his retirement in 2004. His last position is as a chief police officer of Kuala Lumpur. After his retirement from police service, he has since become director or executive vice-president of various companies in Malaysia. He was awarded the Datuk title by the Sultan of Selangor in 2003.

His late older brother Sardar Khan was also a football player for Selangor and Malaysia. He is the former police chief of Kuala Lumpur, and currently working as vice-president of the Malaysian Resources Corporation Bhd (MRCB)

== Honours ==
- Malaysia
  - Commander of the Order of Loyalty to the Royal Family of Malaysia (PSD) – Datuk (2004)
  - Companion of the Order of Loyalty to the Royal Family of Malaysia (JSD) (1989)
  - Member of the Order of the Defender of the Realm (AMN) (1980)
  - Herald of the Order of Loyalty to the Royal Family of Malaysia (BSD) (1982)
  - Recipient of the General Service Medal (PPA)
  - Recipient of the 7th Yang di-Pertuan Agong Installation Medal
  - Recipient of the 8th Yang di-Pertuan Agong Installation Medal
  - Recipient of the 9th Yang di-Pertuan Agong Installation Medal
  - Recipient of the 10th Yang di-Pertuan Agong Installation Medal
  - Recipient of the 11th Yang di-Pertuan Agong Installation Medal
- Royal Malaysia Police
  - Loyal Commander of the Most Gallant Police Order (PSPP) (2003)
  - Recipient of the Presentation of Police Colours Medal
- Pahang
  - Knight Companion of the Order of Sultan Ahmad Shah of Pahang (DSAP) – Dato' (2002)
  - Knight Companion of the Order of the Crown of Pahang (DIMP) – Dato' (1999)
  - Member of the Order of the Crown of Pahang (AMP)
- Selangor
  - Knight Commander of the Order of the Crown of Selangor (DPMS) – Dato' (2003)
  - Member of the Order of Sultan Salahuddin Abdul Aziz Shah (ASA)
  - Recipient of the Sultan Salahuddin Silver Jubilee Medal
