= Ahmad Kamil Jaafar =

Malaysian politician (1937–2021)

Yang Berbahagia Tan Sri Datuk Ahmad Kamil Jaafar PSM PSD DSDK DPCM JMN KMN

Secretary General of the Ministry of Foreign Affairs of Malaysia
- In office April 1989 – August 1996

Personal details
- Born: 27 August 1937 Kulim, Kedah, Unfederated Malay States
- Died: 3 April 2021 (aged 83)

Ahmad Kamil bin Jaafar (27 August 1937 – 3 April 2021) was a Malaysian politician and diplomat.

== Biography ==
Jaafar was born in the Kulim District and attended Malay College Kuala Kangsar and the University of Malaya. He served as Secretary General of the Ministry of Foreign Affairs from April 1989 to August 1996 and was Ambassador of Malaysia to Switzerland, China, Japan, and Thailand. He was then the Prime Minister's Special Envoy to the Non-Aligned Movement, where he was highly respected due to his English language proficiency.

On 30 March 2011, an exhibition of paintings by Malaysian ambassadors was displayed at the National Visual Arts Gallery in Kuala Lumpur, which included works owned by Jaafar.

== Death ==
Ahmad Kamil Jaafar died on 3 April 2021 at the age of 83.

== Honours ==
- Malaysia
  - Officer of the Order of the Defender of the Realm (KMN) (1975)
  - Companion of the Order of the Defender of the Realm (JMN) (1980)
  - Commander of the Order of Loyalty to the Royal Family of Malaysia (PSD) – Datuk (1989)
  - Commander of the Order of Loyalty to the Crown of Malaysia (PSM) – Tan Sri (1992)
- Perak
  - Knight Commander of the Order of Cura Si Manja Kini (DPCM) – Dato' (1982)
- Kedah
  - Knight Companion of the Order of Loyalty to the Royal House of Kedah (DSDK) – Dato' (1987)

=== Foreign Honours ===
- Thailand
  - Order of the White Elephant (1998)
- Japan
  - Grand Cordon of the Order of the Rising Sun (1998)
- France
  - Commander of the Ordre national du Mérite (1998)
  - Commander of the Legion of Honour (1999)
