= List of people from Terengganu =

State flag of Terengganu

The following is a list of prominent people who were born in or have lived in the Malaysian state of Terengganu, or for whom Terengganu is a significant part of their identity.

== A ==
- Anuar Manan – cyclist, born in Kuala Terengganu
- Azian Mazwan Sapuwan - Singer []
- Azizulhasni Awang - cyclist
- Aliaa Mansor - cyclist

== E ==
- Eman Manan - actor

== H ==
- Hazman Al-Idrus - singer

== J ==
- Junaidi Arif - badminton player and actor

== M ==
- Mohammad Zuki Ali - Ketua Setiausaha Negara
- Muhammad Adam Danish Abdullah - footballer

== N ==
- Nora Danish – actress, born in Kuala Terengganu

== R ==
- Rafizi Ramli – politician, born in Besut
- Rozzi Panji - Drummer, Sessionist for concerts and recordings, Club Performer.

== S ==
- Salleh Abas – Lord President of the Supreme Court, born in Besut

== Z ==
- Zoey Rahman - TV host
- Zizan Razak - actor
