= Sara Jorge =

- Born: Sara Kofteros; 31 August 1978 (age 47)
- Origin: London, England
- Genres: Pop, dance, Europop
- Years active: 2002–2007
- Label: Purple City

Sara Jorge (born Sara Kofteros on 31 August 1978) is an English singer and songwriter. She has appeared in minor roles in films including Die Another Day, and on several television shows for Channel 4, Sky One and Sky Sports including ITV1's Daddy's Girl. She has also worked as a presenter on Friendly TV.

== Career ==
Her first releases, "Passion for My Love", "Dreamin'" and "Love You to Death" were available via her first web site of early 2003 for free download, the latter being reworked some time later as "L.U.2.D." on the "Shock to the System" debut release.

In 2004, Sara Jorge released the single "Let Your Heart Go Free", a collaboration with the band Titan 3. She released two singles in 2005, "Shock to the System" and "Dirty Business". In early 2006, Sara Jorge released her third solo single "Beautiful World", which reached number one in the UK dance charts. The next single, "Keep it Comin'!" was the official follow up.

The credits for R3MIX include Rob Davis, Gary Clark, Ash Howes and Martin Harrigton, Gary Barlow and Elliott Kennedy.

== Discography ==
=== Albums ===
- 2006 R3MIX

=== Singles ===
Year	Single	Album	UK
2004	"Let Your Heart Go Free" (featuring Titan 3)	not released	
2005	"Shock to the System"	R3MIX	
2005	"Dirty Business"	R3MIX	
2006	"Beautiful World"	R3MIX	
2006	"Keep it Comin'!"	R3MIX	

=== Collaborations ===
- 2004: "Let Your Heart Go Free" (with Titan 3)

=== Promo singles ===
- 2004: "Shock to the System"
- 2005: "Dirty Business"
- 2006: "Beautiful World"

=== Compilations ===
Compilations containing Sara Jorge songs.

- 2004: Big Tunes - "Let Your Heart Go Free"
- 2004: The Annual Summer 2004 - "Let Your Heart Go Free"
- 2005: Huge Club Tunes - "Dirty Business"
- 2006: DJ Only 85 - "Beautiful World"

=== B-sides ===
- "L.U.2.D. (Love You to Death)" appears as the b-side to "Shock to the System" (2005).
- "To be Loved" appears as the b-side to "Beautiful World" (2006).
- "One Good Thing" appears as the b-side to "Dirty Business" two-track promo single (2005).
