= Order of Loyalty to the Royal Family of Malaysia =

Awarded by the King of Malaysia
- Type: State Order
- Established: 3 September 1965
- Ribbon: Yellow with a red-edged white central stripe and green edges.
- Motto: Setia dan Bakti
- Awarded for: Service and loyalty to the Crown, often to members of the armed forces, police and civil service.
- Status: Currently constituted
- Sovereign: Sultan Ibrahim, King of Malaysia
- Grades: Commander (PSD); Companion (JSD); Officer (KSD); Herald (BSD)
- Post-nominals: P.S.D. / J.S.D. / K.S.D. / B.S.D.

Statistics
- First induction: 1965
- Last induction: 2017
- Total inductees: 186 Commanders; 261 Companions; 389 Officers; 1,774 Heralders; 9 Honorary Commanders; 5 Honorary Companions; 0 Honorary Officers; 2 Honorary Heralders

Precedence
- Next (higher): Order of Meritorious Service
- Next (lower): Star of the Commander of Valour
- The ribbon of the order

The Most Distinguished Order of Loyalty to the Royal Family of Malaysia (Malay: Darjah Yang Amat Dihormati Setia Diraja) is a Malaysian federal award presented for service and loyalty to the Crown, often to members of the armed forces, police and civil service.

== Order ranks ==
Ribbon pattern of the ranks
P.S.D.	J.S.D.
K.S.D.	B.S.D.

=== Commander ===
The highest class of the order is the Commander of the Order of Loyalty to the Royal Family of Malaysia (P.S.D.) (Malay: Panglima Setia Diraja).

The award recipient receives the title Datuk and his wife Datin.

There is no limit to the number of persons to be awarded this honour. It can also be conferred on foreign citizens as an honorary award.

=== Companion ===
Companion of the Order of Loyalty to the Royal Family of Malaysia (J.S.D.) (Malay: Johan Setia Diraja) is the second class of this order.

There is no limit to the number of persons to be awarded this honour. It can also be conferred on foreign citizens as an honorary award. It does not carry any title.

=== Officer ===
Officer of the Order of Loyalty to the Royal Family of Malaysia (K.S.D.) (Malay: Kesatria Setia Diraja) is the third class of this order.

There is no limit to the number of persons to be awarded this honour. It can also be conferred on foreign citizens as an honorary award. It does not carry any title.

=== Herald ===
Herald of the Order of Loyalty to the Royal Family of Malaysia (B.S.D.) (Malay: Bentara Setia Diraja) is the lowest class of this order.

There is no limit to the number of persons to be awarded this honour. It can also be conferred on foreign citizens as an honorary award. It does not carry any title.

== Recipients ==
=== Commanders (P.S.D.) ===
The Commanders receives the title Datuk and his wife Datin.

- 1965: Nik Mustapha Fathil
- 1965: Jaafar Mampak
- 1965: Chellapah Sinnadurai
- 1966: R. P. Pillai
- 1968: Abu Bakar Ibrahim
- 1968: Mohamed Shariff Ibrahim
- 1968: Tuanku Mustapha Tunku Besar Burhanuddin
- 1968: Syed Mohamed Syed Alwee
- 1969: Tunku Mohamed Tunku Besar Burhanuddin
- 1969: Sheikh Hussein Sheikh Mohamed
- 1969: Nik Hassan Nik Abdul Rahman
- 1969: Keshaminder Singh
- 1970: Kwok Kin Keng
- 1970: Kuljit Singh
- 1970: Y.L. Narayana
- 1972: Ahmad Zainal Abidin Mohd Yusof
- 1972: Ariffin Ngah Marzuki
- 1972: Jaswant Singh Sodhy
- 1973: Wan Ahmad Wan Omar
- 1974: Lee Seng Guan
- 1975: Abdul Mohsein Salleh
- 1975: Zakaria Mohd Ali
- 1976: Abdul Aziz Zakaria
- 1976: Abdul Mallek Mohamed
- 1977: Mahbob Ahmad
- 1977: K. A. Menon
- 1977: K. Sarvananthan
- 1978: Abdullah Ali
- 1978: Zain Azraai Zainal Abidin
- 1978: Ibrahim Mahmud
- 1978: Tengku Besar Mahmud
- 1978: Tunku Asiah
- 1978: Ibrahim Mohamed
- 1979: Mahmood Nassir
- 1979: Abbas Abdul Manan
- 1982: Tengku Ismail
- 1982: Tunku Adnan Tunku Besar Burhanuddin
- 1982: Raja Karib Shah
- 1982: Engku Ibrahim Engku Ngah
- 1983: Tengku Mustapha
- 1983: Ahmad Shahir Daud
- 1983: Abdul Kudus Alias
- 1983: Hussain Mohd. Yusof
- 1983: J.C. Chang
- 1983: Lim Sun Hoe
- 1984: Yahaya bin Shafie
- 1984: Tengku Ubaidullah
- 1984: Abdul Jabid Mohd. Don
- 1984: Mohd Zaman Khan
- 1984: Wan Hassan Wan Daud
- 1987: Khalid Abdul Karim
- 1987: Hamzah Mohd Noor
- 1987: Abu Hassan Din Al-Hafiz
- 1987: Hasbullah Yusof
- 1988: Mukhtar Shamsuddin
- 1988: Abang Zainie Abang Suhai
- 1989: Ahmad Kamil Jaafar
- 1991: Zubir Haji Ali
- 1991: Abdul Malek Abdul Aziz
- 1991: Harun Din
- 1991: Yeop Adlan Che Rose
- 1991: Noordin Abd. Razak
- 1992: Henry Chin Poy Wu
- 1992: Jalaluddin Rahim
- 1992: Punch Gunalan
- 1993: Abdul Halim Abdul Rauf
- 1993: Clifford F. Herbert
- 1993: Raja Ibrahim Raja Shahriman
- 1993: Abdul Wahid Shamsuddin
- 1993: Lily Abdul Majeed
- 1993: Chin Chein Tet
- 1993: Radha Krishna a/l A.K. Sabapathy
- 1993: Mohd. Salleh Hj. Hassan
- 1993: Subramaniam @ Muthu a/l Nadarajah Chettiar
- 1993: Chan Fook Kow
- 1994: Harun Baba
- 1994: Ismail bin Haji Ahmad
- 1994: Omardin Abdul Wahab
- 1995: Jalaludin Bahaudin
- 1995: Nordin Yusof
- 1995: Tony Tiah Thee Kian
- 1996: Ang Lai Soon
- 1997: Abdul Rahman Ali
- 1997: Termizi Thayaparan
- 1997: SM Nasimuddin SM Amin
- 1997: M. Zain Majid
- 1998: Zainal Azman Zainal Abidin
- 1998: Baharuddin Abd. Kadir
- 1998: Tunku Mahmud
- 1998: Wong Akau
- 1998: Tunku Sheilah
- 1999: Hajjah Badariah Arshad
- 1999: Tunku Nazihah
- 1999: Abas Salleh
- 1999: Mohamad Hasan
- 1999: Tunku Mudzaffar
- 1999: Mansor bin Masikon
- 1999: Sri Kumar
- 2000: Abdul Aziz Mohd. Yusof
- 2000: Engku Ibrahim Engku Ngah
- 2000: Mohamad bin Ali
- 2000: Tengku Puteri Zahariah
- 2000: Tengku Ahmad Shah
- 2000: Mohd Sharif Jajang
- 2000: Patrick Lim Soo Kit
- 2001: Abdul Rashid Asari
- 2002: Abdullah Yatim
- 2002: Halijah Othman
- 2002: Abdul Razak Abu Samah
- 2002: Razman Md. Hashim
- 2002: Mohd Anwar Mohd Nor
- 2003: Muhammad bin Mohd. Noor
- 2003: Hanif bin Haji Darimi
- 2003: Nik Ismail Nik Mohamed
- 2004: Syed Danial Syed Ahmad
- 2004: Dell Akbar Khan
- 2004: Mohammed Yusof Hussain
- 2004: Jamal Hisne Ismail
- 2004: Mazidah Abd. Majid
- 2006: Mohydin bin Che' Jan
- 2006: Vanamaly a/l K.S. Menon
- 2006: Abd. Razak Abd. Aziz
- 2006: Shahron bin Ibrahim
- 2006: Yahya bin Hj. Bidin
- 2007: Zakaria Sulong
- 2007: Mat Yasin Mat Daud
- 2008: Awang Kechik Abdul Rahman
- 2008: Abdul Aziz Ibrahim
- 2009: Sabtu bin Awam @ Awap
- 2009: Tengku Farok Hussin
- 2009: Adnan bin Haji Abu Bakar
- 2009: Mohd Zaki Mokhtar
- 2010: Ahmad Shukri Md Salleh
- 2010: Mohd. Asri Abd. Ghapar
- 2010: Shaharuddin Md. Som
- 2010: Wan Hamidah Wan Ibrahim
- 2010: Wan Zahidi Wan Teh
- 2010: Tan Si Yen
- 2010: Ryan Ponnudurai
- 2011: Mohd Zuki Ali
- 2011: Tunku Nooruddin
- 2011: Tan Hong Hing
- 2011: Kee Cheng Teik
- 2011: Shaikh Abdul Halim Shaikh Salah Marie Al Kathir
- 2011: Zulkifli Ishak
- 2011: Abdulahalim Haji Nawi
- 2011: Khairul Anuar Yahya
- 2011: Zaharin Ahmad
- 2012: Elmi Yusoff
- 2012: Adzmi Din
- 2012: Musa Mohd Safr
- 2013: Khairil Annas Jusoh
- 2013: Mohamed Badrulnizam Long Bidin
- 2013: Naimun Ashakli Mohammad
- 2013: Norliza Rofli
- 2013: Mohd Norazmi Mohd Yasin
- 2013: Romlee Yahaya
- 2014: Zolkopli Dahalan
- 2014: Abd. Aziz Che Yacob
- 2014: Rokiah Omar
- 2014: Md Tajri Alwi
- 2014: Nizam Jaffar
- 2014: Mohd Reza Mohd Sany
- 2014: Mastor Mohd. Ariff
- 2015: Kamis Samin
- 2015: Mariam Kholidah Zulkifli
- 2015: Muhammad Radzi Abu Hassan
- 2015: Azizan Md Delin
- 2016: Halimah Hashim
- 2016: Alzamani Mohammad Idrose
- 2016: Mohd Zakaria Yadi
- 2016: Tunku Aziz Bendahara
- 2017: Kamilan Maksom
- 2017: Norazman Ayob
- 2017: Farizah Ahmad
- 2017: Tengku Mohamad Ridzman
- 2017: Lam Yin Chon
- 2017: Ng Soon Hong
- 2019: Azuan Effendy Zairakithnaini
- 2019: Wan Ahmad Dahlan Abdul Aziz
- 2019: Engku Hamzah Tuan Mat
- 2019: Mohd Ashri Muda
- 2019: Rozainor bin Ramli
- 2019: Nik Mohd Shafriman Nik Hassan
- 2019: Ahmad Osman
- 2019: Mamat Ariffin Abdullah
- 2019: Zamrose Mohd Zain
- 2020: Mohammad Ismail
- 2020: Roziah Abudin
- 2020: Zanariah Hussein
- 2020: Mahathar Abd Wahab
- 2020: Suriakala Suriabagavan
- 2021: Shahrul Kamal Osman
- 2021: Azlan Abdul Rahman
- 2022: Jazmanie Shafawi
- 2022: Wan Zaidi Wan Abdullah
- 2022: Sharum Shaim
- 2023: Mohd Aseral Jusman
- 2023: Mohd Aini Atan
- 2023: Abdul Halim Hamzah
- 2023: 'Ainu Sham Haji Ramli
- 2023: Arman Rumaizi Ahmad
- 2023: Zahari Mohd Ariffin
- 2023: Mohamed Zahari Yahya

== Honorary Recipients ==
=== Honorary Commanders (P.S.D.) ===
- 1968: T. J. Danaraj
- 1994: Juan Claudio Ilharreborde
- 1995: Abdul al-Majali
- 2001: Enrique Peñalosa
- 2002: Richard Ng Ang Lee
- 2017: Prakash Chandran Madhu Sudanan
- 2017: Marco Ronaldo Mario Caramella
