= Manopsak Kram =

Thai-Malaysian footballer (born 1988)

Personal information
- Full name: Manopsak s/o Kram
- Date of birth: 27 November 1988 (age 37)
- Place of birth: Alor Setar, Kedah, Malaysia
- Position: Midfielder

Youth career
- 2006–2008: Kedah FA President Cup

Senior career*
| Years | Team | Apps | (Gls) |
| 2009 | Kedah FA | | |
| 2010–2012 | Pos Malaysia FC | | |
| 2013-2014 | Selangor FA | | |
| 2015 | Johor Darul Ta'zim F.C. | | |
- * Club domestic league appearances and goals

Manopsak Kram (born 27 November 1988 in Alor Setar, Kedah) is a Thai-Malaysian footballer and younger brother of footballer Samransak Kram. He currently plays for Pos Malaysia FC as a midfielder.

He also has played in Kedah's President Cup starting from 2006 to 2008 season.
