= Henry Chin Poy Wu =

Former Malaysian police officer

Tan Sri Henry Chin Poy Wu (11 August 1937 – 23 October 2016) was former Malaysian police officer and a member of Sabah Royal Commission of Illegal Immigration.

He was the first Chinese senior police officer appointed as Kuala Lumpur Police Chief in 1990.

== Early life ==
Henry Chin Poy Wu was born on Kuching, Sarawak on 11 August 1937. His father Chen Di Chen (a former Chinese school superintendent) died early, and his younger brother Chen Pei Xiong both grew up in Kota Kinabalu under the careful care of their mother Cheah Xiayu (the kindergarten principal).

== Police career ==
After taking the Cambridge Higher Diploma at the age of 18, Henry Chin Poy Wu joined the North Borneo Police Force on 14 July 1955 as Probationary Inspector. From 1956 to 1961, he has been transferred to Kudat District Police Headquarter and Tawau District Police Headquarter as Investigate Officer. At that time, pirates were rampant along the coast of North Borneo (Sabah), and Chin went out to sea many times to fight pirates head-on. At the time, only 19 years old, Chin led his men to repel the pirates many times, so he became famous. In 1959, 22-year-old Chin was shot in his left elbow during a battle with pirates, and the scar left became an indelible mark on his career in the police force.

On 3 July 1961, he was transferred to Sabah Police Contingent Headquarter as Senior Inspector. In 1965, he was promoted to Kota Kinabalu District Police Chief, a few years later he became Tawau District Police Chief. On 4 July 1979, Chin was promoted to Head of Perak Criminal Investigation Department and on 4 January 1982, he was promoted to Head of Johor Criminal Investigation Department. From 1983 to 1990, Chin became Sabah Deputy Police Commissioner and deputy director of Bukit Aman Special Branch.

On 22 June 1990, Chin became Kuala Lumpur Police Chief being the first Chinese senior police officer appointed to this position. After Chin take over as Kuala Lumpur Police Chief, in just one year, the crime rate in KL City has been greatly reduced, which has won praise from the public. Subsequently, in August 1992, Chin at the age 55 was scheduled retired mandatory. But the Chinese communities at that time start a petition to hoped that the government would allow him to stay in office, and he was finally granted by Prime Minister and Minister of Home Affairs at that time, Mahathir Mohamad for a one-year stay, and he was officially retired on 12 August 1993.

== Post career ==
After Chin retired from Police Force, he became a director of several listed companies. Before his death, he was one of the members of the Malaysia Crime Prevention Foundation as well as the Royal Commission of Inquiry (RCI) on illegal immigrants in Sabah. He was also a member of the Universiti Malaysia Sabah (UMS) board of directors.

== Death ==
Henry Chin Poy Wu died from a stroke on 23 October 2016.

== Honours ==
- Malaysia :
  - Member of the Order of the Defender of the Realm (AMN) (1972)
  - Commander of the Order of Loyalty to the Royal Family of Malaysia (PSD) – Datuk (1992)
  - Commander of the Order of Loyalty to the Crown of Malaysia (PSM) – Tan Sri (2014)
