= List of people from Perlis =

State flag of Perlis

The following is a list of prominent people who were born in or have lived in the Malaysian state of Perlis, or for whom Perlis is a significant part of their identity.

== A-L ==
- Abdul Hamid Omar – first Chief Justice of Malaysia, born in Kuala Perlis
- Abdul Latif Romly – athlete, born at Kampung Paya Kelubi
- Bryan Loo – entrepreneur, founder of the Tealive chain of bubble tea-based beverages
- Che Rosli Che Mat – politician, born in Arau
- Hani Mohsin – actor, born in Kangar

== Q ==
- Queenzy Cheng: Famous Malaysian Chinese artiste, actress and singer (one of the member of Malaysia Chinese girl group band M-Girls) - died on 28 November 2023

== R-Z ==
none
