= List of people from Kedah =

State flag of Kedah

The following is a list of prominent people who were born in or have lived in the Malaysian state of Kedah, or for whom Kedah is a significant part of their identity.

== A ==
- Aznil Bidin - weightlifter, born in Alor Setar.

== F ==
- Farid Kamil - Malaysian actor, born in Alor Setar.

== I ==
- Ismail Omar – 9th Inspector-General of Police of Malaysia, born in Kulim.

== J ==
- Janna Nick - Malaysian actress and singer, born in Sungai Petani.

== K ==
- Khir Johari – politician, former Malaysian Minister of Education, born in Alor Setar.

== L ==
- Lee Zii Jia - badminton player, born in Alor Setar.

== M ==
- Mahathir Mohamad – Fourth Prime Minister of Malaysia, born in Alor Setar.
- Siti Nurmasyitah Mohd Yusoff or Masya Masyitah - Bintang Ceria contestant, born and raised in Kulim.

== P ==
- Pearly Tan - badminton player, born in Alor Setar.

== S ==
- Shahnon Ahmad – writer, Malaysian National Laureate, born in Sik.

== T ==
- Tunku Abdul Rahman - First Prime Minister of Malaysia, born in Alor Setar.

== W ==
- Wan Muhd Syahmie Bin Wan Shahar – is a Malaysian primary school teacher based in Alor Setar, Kedah. He teaches English at the primary level and is involved in school co-curricular activities, including Kadet Remaja Sekolah (KRS). His work includes classroom instruction, curriculum planning, and the organisation of educational and student development programmes.

In addition to his teaching responsibilities, Syahmie has contributed to school initiatives through the preparation of educational materials, event coordination, and student activities. His professional interests include English language education, educational technology, and student-centred learning approaches.

Outside of education, Syahmie has an interest in fitness, motorcycles, football, and graphic design. He is also known for creating digital posters and visual materials for school programmes and community activities.

== Y ==
Yuna - International singer, songwriter, born in Alor Setar.
