= Aliaa Mansor =

Malaysian cyclist (born 2001)

Personal information
- Full name: Siti Nur Aliaa Mansor
- Born: 2 August 2001 (age 25) Kuala Terengganu, Terengganu, Malaysia
- Height: 163 cm (5 ft 4 in)

Cycling career
- Sport: Cycling
- Current team: Canyon–SRAM
- Disciplines: Track and road
- Role: Rider
- Rider type: Sprinter

Professional teams
- ????: Terengganu Cycling Team
- 2022: Canyon–SRAM
Medal record
Representing Malaysia
Women's road bicycle racing
SUKMA
Silver medal – second place	2018 Sukma	{{{2}}}
Bronze medal – third place	2018 Sukma	{{{2}}}
Southeast Asian Games

Siti Nur Aliaa Mansor (born 2 August 2001) is a Malaysian racing cyclist & track cyclist, who currently rides for Canyon SRAM Racing Team. Hafifi Mansor former Malaysia heavyweight & Faizal Mansor former footballer are her brothers. Aliaa Mansor is the first woman from Malaysia and Southeast Asian to join the Spanish-based European cycling team.
