= Kong Hon Kong =

Malaysian businessman and philanthropist (born 1954)

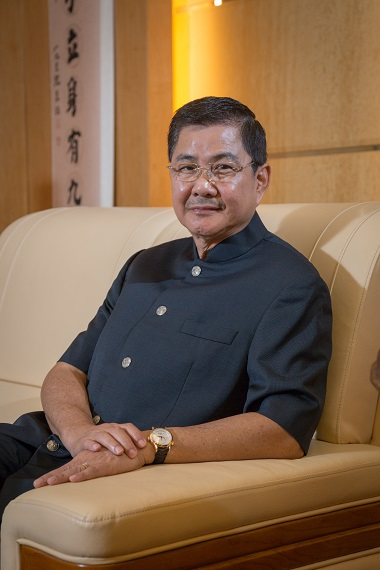
Tan Sri Kong Hon Kong

Tan Sri Kong Hon Kong (Chinese: 鄺漢光; pinyin: Kuàng Hànguāng; Jyutping: Kwong3 Hon3 Gwong1; Pe̍h-ōe-jī: Kóng Hàn-kong; born in 1954), is a Malaysian businessman and philanthropist who founded Nirvana Asia Group, the largest integrated funeral service provider in Malaysia.

Kong has been Nirvana Asia Group executive director since October 1990 and was appointed as Nirvana Asia Ltd managing director and chief executive officer in February 2009. He is currently the executive chairman of Nirvana Asia Group.

== Early life ==
The third of ten children, Kong was born in 1954 to a family of rubber tappers in Kuala Lipis, a small town located in the Lipis district of the state of Pahang in Peninsular Malaysia.

In 1990, he secured an unprecedented license to develop 50 acres of land located in the Semenyih district of the state of Selangor, near Kuala Lumpur, into a private garden-like, scenic memorial park. As a result, a new landmark called Nirvana Memorial Park began to take shape in Semenyih. The 797-acres memorial park has since become a prominent feature that gained a huge following and revolutionized the death care industry in Malaysia. With the ever-increasing demand for a graceful and dignified final resting place, Nirvana Asia Group grew from a fledgling business into a leading regional enterprise within a short period of time, establishing a network of 21 memorial parks, columbarium facilities and/or funeral homes.

== Business career ==
Kong was first inspired to venture into funeral services when his father-in-law died in 1985. Tasked with locating a suitable burial plot, he visited a cemetery managed by the local clan associations since at that time there were no private cemeteries in Malaysia. The awkwardness of having to walk around the overcrowded cemetery inspired him to do something about the lackluster way of how the conventional cemeteries were managed.

Kong was granted the license to operate a private cemetery five years later and opened Nirvana Memorial Park in Semenyih. The cemetery was landscaped to promote serenity and is today a key tourist attraction.

Kong listed Nirvana Asia Group as NV Multi Corporation Berhad on the Main Market of Bursa Malaysia on 3 August 2000. In 2012, Nirvana Asia Group was named “Asia’s Outstanding Brand in Funeral Service Industry” and “Asia’s Outstanding Award in Multi National Expansion” at the 2012 Asia Funeral Expo (AFE) Awards Ceremony. In 2013, the Group became Malaysia's torchbearer in the bereavement care industry once again, having won the “Corporate Social Responsibility Award” and “Marketing Strategy Award” at the 2013 Asian Funeral Exhibition (AFE Awards).

In December 2014, Nirvana Asia was listed on the Hong Kong Stock Exchange, managing to raise RM1 billion without much difficulty although it was considered a not so easy endeavour in Malaysia. The Hong Kong platform became a key advantage to expand overseas. The best just got better and being an industry leader, Nirvana Asia Group would keep on scaling greater heights subsequently. It was ranked No. 1 in "Best Small-Cap Company in Hong Kong" in the 2015 Asia's Best Managed Companies Poll by FinanceAsia. Another notable accolade is the crowning of the Listed Enterprise Excellence Awards 2015 by Capital Weekly.

== Philanthropy ==
Kong feels obliged to giving back to the society. Over the years, he has donated millions to charities, including Chinese associations and education bodies. He spearheaded a RM2.5-million donation drive for Nepal in the wake of the catastrophic earthquake in April 2015.

In April 2020, Kong has also donated close to RM8 million worth in medical equipment and essential supplies through Nirvana Asia Group to medical frontliners battling the Covid-19 outbreak and the needy affected by the pandemic.

In an effort to promote a proud showpiece of the Chinese culture, Kong established a RM10-million Chinese Calligraphy Stone Gallery at Nirvana Memorial Park which houses 138 polished and exquisitely crafted rocks with inscriptions depicting major historic events across China's 16 dynasties, ranging from the Shang dynasty to the modern era.

In addition, the gallery also showcases the evolution of Chinese calligraphy. Masterpieces by Chinese, Japanese, Korean, Taiwanese, Malaysian poets, painters and craftsmen are part of the prominent feature.

Nirvana Asia Group's NV Foundation also assists the underprivileged via community projects and charitable activities to provide, amongst others, medical assistance, facilities and financial assistance.

== Achievement and awards ==
1999: Received Darjah Indera Mahkota Pahang (DIMP) award

2009: Awarded World's Top 10 Chinese Entrepreneurial Role Models at the 4th China's Entrepreneurship Summit in 2009

2014: Received “Personal Lifetime Achievement Award” in “1st Golden Entrepreneur Award”

2015: Received Darjah Kebesaran Panglima Setia Mahkota (PSM) award

2016: 34th Richest Man in Malaysia for the 2016 ranking by Forbes

2016: Tan Sri Kong Success Stories listed in The Malaysia Book of Records

2017: 24th Richest Man in Malaysia for the 2017 ranking by Forbes

2017: Awarded “Global Game Changers” in 2017 by Forbes

2017: Received “The Lifetime Achievement Award” of World Chinese Economic Summit, 2017 in the category of Bereavement Service

2017: Received “Asian Entrepreneur Award” by Top 10 of Asia Award

2018: 22nd Richest Man in Malaysia for the 2018 ranking by Forbes

2019: 16th Richest Man in Malaysia for the 2019 ranking by Forbes

2019: Conferred “Paul Harris Fellow” by Rotary International

2020: 20th Richest man in Malaysia for the 2020 ranking by Forbes
