= Zalif Sidek =

Malaysian actor and comedian (born 1985)

- زاليف سيدق
- Born: Md Zalif Naquiyudin bin Wan Abu Bakar Sidek; 1 August 1985 (age 41); Kuala Terengganu, Terengganu, Malaysia
- Occupations: Actor, comedian
- Years active: 2007–present
- Spouse: Anis Marzuki (m. 2022)

Md Zalif Naquiyudin Wan Abu Bakar Sidek (born 1 August 1985) is a Malaysian actor and comedian, best known for his acting roles in television, film and commercials.

== Career ==
Before starting his acting career, Zalif first ventured into commercial acting around 2007. In 2008, he joined KRU Studios as a Promotion Executive. Despite working at KRU Studios, Zalif still spends some time on advertising. Among the advertisements he has made are Panadol Soluble Actifast and the DiGi mascot with yellow costumes and Astro First 'ambassadors.'

Zalif made his first film appearance through a side character in the comedy action film Bini-Biniku Gangster directed by Ismail Bob Hashim. He was entrusted by director Hashim Rejab to succeed in the lead role with Lisa Surihani and Mia Sara Nasuha in the film Papa I Love You which was released on 29 December 2011, revolving around the love and dilemma faced by a single father towards his daughter after his wife's death. The following year, Zalif was paired with Zahiril Adzim in the comedy series, Paan dan Paiz directed by Shahrulezad Mohameddin with a script written by Shamsull Hashim, telling the story of two close friends, Paan and Paiz who have known each others since childhood. Zalif later starred in Razif Rashid's Islamic comedy film, Aji Noh Motor, which was released on 20 September 2012.

He made a special appearance as Gangster Poyo in the film Langgar directed by Sein Ruffedge starring Ady Putra, Namron, Hans Isaac and Zul Huzaimy. Zalif left Metrowealth Pictures after his contract expired and decided to manage his career on his own because he was confident that experience would help him stand stronger.

== Personal life ==
Zalif was born and raised in Kuala Terengganu, Terengganu. Married to Anis Marzuki and now had a daughter and a son.

== Filmography ==
=== Film ===
Year	Title	Role	Notes
2011	Bini-Biniku Gangster	Mat Saja	Debut film appearances
2011	Papa I Love You	Bahar	
2012	Hantu Dalam Botol Kicap	Epul	
2012	Aji Noh Motor	Noh	
2012	Aku Terima Nikahnya		
2012	Budak Pailang		
2013	Ajiboy	Mat Saja	
2013	Pada Suatu Cinta Dahulu	Rudy	
2013	Langgar	Gangster Poyo	
2013	Bencinta	Amin Blur	
2014	Jangan Pandang Belakang Boleh	Dharma	
2014	Lu, Gua, Bro!	Yu	
2015	Keranda Tok Wan Terbang	Young Tok Wan	
2020	Miimaland	Eric	
2021	Selamat Hari X Jadi	Boboi	

=== Drama ===
Year	Title	Role	TV channel	Notes
2011	Mistik Alam Hitam		Astro Ria & Astro Prima	Episode: "Kalung Puaka"
2012	Paan & Paiz	Paan	TV3	
2013	Tanah Kubur (Season 9)	Ali	Astro Oasis	Episode: "Aniaya Yatim"
2015	Ema Emyliana (Season 3)	Zizi	TV3	
2016	Love You, Mr. Arang	Fairus	TV3	
2018	Sejuta Rasa Buat Adelia	Zubir	Astro Ria	
2018	Budak Usin	Hud	TV3	
2018	Destinasi Ukhuwah	Erwan	TV1	
2020	Degup Cinta	Amran	Astro Ria	

=== Commercial ===
Year	Commercial
2007	DiGi
2011	Astro First
2017	Expedia
—N/a	KFC
—N/a	Wonda Coffee
—N/a	Panadol Soluble Actifast
2021	Extra Joss

== Awards and nominations ==
Year	Award	Category	Result
2011	24th Malaysian Film Festival	Best Supporting Actor	Nominated
2011	24th Malaysian Film Festival	Aspiring Male Actor	Nominated
