= Shukri Yahaya =

Malaysian actor

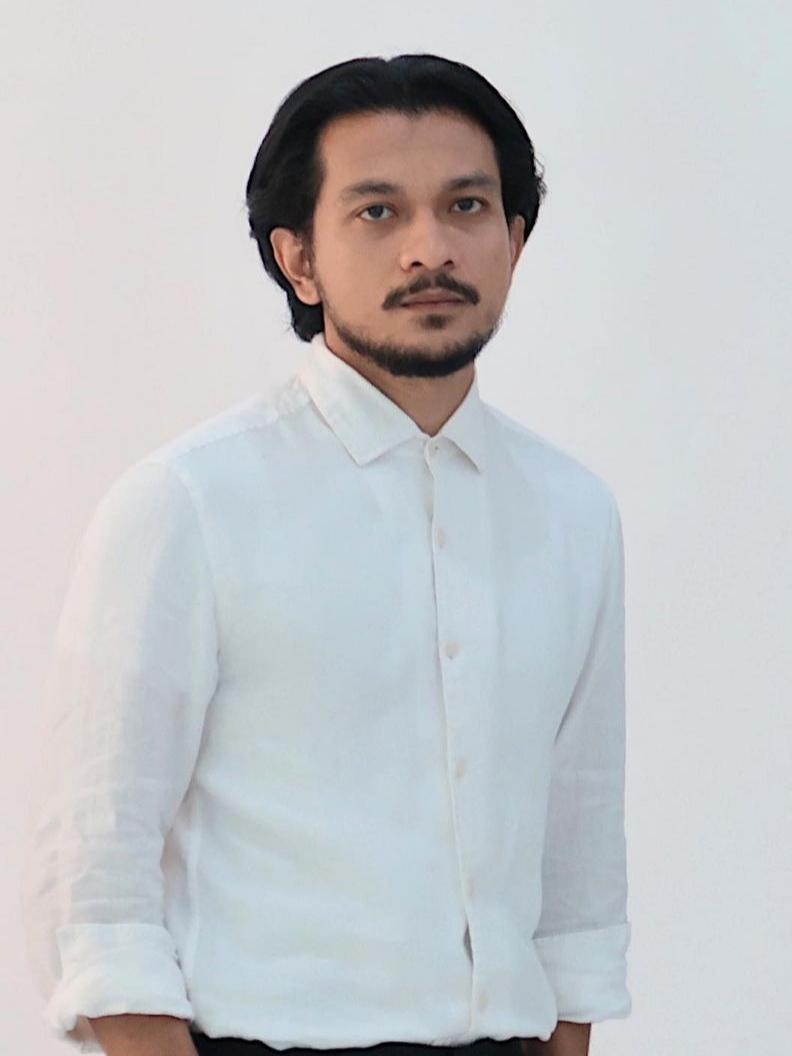
- Born: Mohd Shukri bin Yahaya; 13 June 1988 (age 38); Kuala Lumpur, Malaysia
- Education: Sijil Pelajaran Malaysia (SPM)
- Occupations: Actor, director
- Years active: 2011–present
- Spouse: Tya Adnan (m. 2015)
- Children: 2

Mohd Shukri bin Yahaya (born 13 June 1988) is a Malaysian actor and director. Starting his acting career in 2011 after his talent was discovered by renowned film director Osman Ali through the film Jiwa Taiko. Since then, he has appeared in leading roles in many successful and high-rated television series including Asam Pedas Untuk Dia (2015), 7 Hari Mencintaiku (2016), Andainya Takdir (2017), Andainya Takdir 2 (2018), Kerana Dia Manusia Biasa (2019), 7 Hari Mencintaiku 2 (2020), Rindu Awak Separuh Nyawa (2021), Andai Itu Takdirnya (2023), Layang Layang Perkahwinan (2024) and Curang Tanpa Niat (2024). Throughout his career, he has won several awards for his roles in the television series 7 Hari Mencintaiku, Andainya Takdir and Split TV Series.

== Early life ==
Shukri was born on 13 June 1988 in the Kuala Lumpur Hospital and is the fifth child of six siblings. He was educated with Sijil Pelajaran Malaysia (SPM).

Prior to joining showbiz, he began his career as an auditor at the 7-Eleven, Watsons and Maxis, where he subsequently conducted auditing in branch premises.

He later worked as a clerk at Bank Muamalat's Human Resources division in Jalan Melaka, Kuala Lumpur. During his tenure at Bank Muamalat, he handled internal program of the institution and assist teamwork.

== Acting career ==
Shukri began his acting career in film, Jiwa Taiko and TV3 television series, Juvana. Since then, he remain active in television and film.

== Personal life ==
Shukri married former actress Siti Nurfatihah "Tya" Adnan on 20 November 2015 and together they have a daughter Aaira Ameena, born in August 2016 and a son Maleeq Miqayl, born in July 2020.

== Filmography ==
=== Film ===
Year	Title	Role	Notes
2012	Jiwa Taiko	Jami	First film
2013	Juvana	Fit	
2013	Sembunyi: Amukan Azazil	Salleh	
2013	Lari	Zakuan	
2013	Ular	Boy	
2018	Surf This Love: Gelora Juara	Billy	
2022	Seratus	Mortuary Caretaker	Cameo appearance
2025	Blood Brothers	Fadlan	
2025	Balas Balik	Detective Zul	
2026	Chelot	Inspector Haqqim	

=== Television series ===
Year	Title	Role	TV channel	Notes
2011	Juvana	Fit	TV3	
2012	Gemersik Kalbu	Rudy	TV3	
2012	Runtun Qalbu	Bon	TV3	
2012	Diari Platun	Zakaria	Astro Prima	
2013	Ruby	Danny	TV3	
2013	Sahabat	Bakri	Astro Ria	
2013	Asmara Luna	Habib	TV3	
2013	Menjinak Ombak	Ziyad	TV3	
2014	Jika Itu Takdirku	Azri	TV3	
2014	Tanah Kubur (Season 9)	Nafal	Astro Oasis	Episode: "Pembalasan Dunia"
2014	Dendam 5 Beradik	Mikhail	Astro Box Office	
2014	PLAN B	Khai	TV3	
2014	Tabuh Merdeka	Ariff Hidayat	TV Alhijrah	
2014	Kifarah	Zaki	TV3	Episode: "Sahabat Subahat"
2015	Asam Pedas Untuk Dia	Ahmad Ziyad	TV3	
2015	Dia Isteri Luar Biasa	Raden Amzar	TV3	
2015	Sirah	Amran	TV9	Episode: "Cukur Jambul"
2015	Kifarah Mistik	Haris	TV3	Episode: "Malam Jumaat"
2015	Cik Cinderella dan Encik Tengku	Tengku Daniel	TV3	
2016	Suami Tanpa Cinta	Zaidan Iman	Astro Ria	
2016	Surah Buat Maisarah	Saiful Nazim	TV3	
2016	7 Hari Mencintaiku	Khuzairi	TV3	
2016	Hantu Punya Bos	Arrayyan Zainuddin	TV3	
2017	Andainya Takdir	Airil	TV3	
2017	Gaduh-Gaduh Sayang	Rafiqi Rayyan	TV1	
2018	Tiada Arah Jodoh Kita	Megat Aathif	TV3	
2018	Pelangi Cinta	Halim	TV3	100Plus Mini Series
2018	Andainya Takdir 2	Airil	TV3	
2018	Vila Ghazara	Hariz	TV3	
2018	Split TV Series	Mikael/ Hafez/ Dhia/ Encik Suffian/ Adam/ Jeff & Kid	Astro Citra	
2018	Opsss...Terpikat Cik Sombong	Hans	Unifi TV	
2018	Ghaib	Reza	Tonton	Tonton Original Series. Adapted from novel "Projek Seram Terowong"
2019	Asalkan Dia Bahagia	Haris Aryan	TV3	
2019	30 Pesanan Suara	Izman	TV3	
2019	Kerana Dia Manusia Biasa	Tengku Shamil	TV3	
2019	Pesan Pada Hati	Yusuf	TV3	
2020	Di Hujung Ranting	Amar	TV2	
2020	7 Hari Mencintaiku 2	Khuzairi	TV3	
2021	Rindu Awak Separuh Nyawa	Nazril Nazim	Astro Ria	
2021	Kelmarin Cinta	Azhar / Azman	TV Okey	
2021	I Promise Janji Anaqi	Zero	Astro Ria	Cameo appearance
2022	Shakira	Amir	TV3	
2022	7 Hari Mencintaiku 3	Khuzairi	TV3	
2023	Stella on Stage	Nik	Sooka	Sooka Original Series
2023	Andai Itu Takdirnya	Syed Adam Aizril	Astro Ria	
2023	Surat Dari Tuhan	Ryan	TV3	
2024	Layang Layang Perkahwinan	Azim Hasibullah	Astro Ria	
2024	Kuih Muah	Adam	Tonton	Tonton Original Series
2024	Hai Cinta, Dengarkanlah	Adib Huzairi	TV3	
2024–2025	Curang Tanpa Niat	Eshaal	Astro Ria	
2025	BRU	Shah	Tonton	Tonton Original Series

=== Telemovie ===
Year	Title	Role	TV channel	Notes
2011	Utusan Ilahi	Daniel	TV3	
2011	Panggilan 10 Zulhijjah	Zaki	TV3	
2011	Di Telapak Kaki Bonda	Salim	TV3	
2011	Azam Ala Kazam	Din Asap	TV3	
2011	Atokku Juniorku	Fadil	Astro Warna	
2012	Jatuh Cinta	Izman	TV3	
2012	Alamak 7 Hari Lagi	Andi	TV3	
2012	Mariam Kampung Putat	Shah	TV3	
2012	Perempuan Itu Ibuku	Azri	TV3	
2013	Mawar Putih Tanda Perpisahan	Megat	Astro Box Office	
2013	Baju Raya Kain Perca	Amin	TV3	
2014	Yang Mana Satu	Shukri	TV3	
2014	Nenek Ranggi	Yazid	TV3	
2014	Antara Dia	Ryan	TV2	
2014	Selempang Kuning	Bahar	Astro Prima	
2014	Kereta Kita	Amran	TV3	
2014	Sebuah Pangkin Kayu	Omar	Astro Prima	
2014	Engkau Laksana Bulan	Ridz	TV1	
2015	Mahar Cinta Alia	Hezri	TV3	
2015	Jalan Taubat	Zul	TV3	
2015	Isteriku Bukan Tukang Masak	Shukri	Astro Prima	Cameo appearance
2015	Cinta Qasidah	Ryan	Astro Ria	
2015	Abang Beduk	Ahmad Nizamuddin	Astro Oasis	
2015	Munajat Terhenti	Yusri	TV2	
2016	Surat Buat Bakal Isteriku	Fakhrul Radzi	Astro Ria	
2016	Perempuan Disarung Ungu	Zamani	Astro Ria	
2016	Auta	Nizam	TV3	
2016	Lamar	Hairul	TV3	
2016	Calon Syurga	Aliff	TV3	
2016	Cik Cinderella dan Encik Tengku Raya	Tengku Daniel	TV3	
2016	Suami Tanpa Cinta Raya	Zaidan Iman	Astro Ria	
2016	Janji Hati	Along	TV2	
2017	Rasuk	Asyraf	Astro Citra	
2017	Kasih Seorang Ayah	Husin	TV3	
2017	The Berlian Job	Syam	Astro Citra	
2017	Jongkong	Wan Ibrahim	Astro Citra	
2018	Qaseh Venezia	Adam	ntv7	
2018	Selirat	Madi	TV3	
2018	Matilahnak	Jep/Hantu Jepun	Astro Citra	
2018	Akil & Juan	Adam	TV3	
2019	Nana Dan Jam Atok	Samad	TV3	
2019	Rengkat	Rais	TV3	
2019	Remuk	Zamri	TV3	
2019	Peraturan: Ikut Atau Mati	Owdy	Astro Citra	
2020	Kasih Tau Foo Fah	Fitri	TV3	Cameo appearance
2022	Raya Talak Satu	Danni	Astro Ria	Also as director

== Videography ==
=== Music video ===
Year	Song title	Singer
2019	"As Never Before" (All-new Toyota Vios MV)	Shukri Yahaya & Shawn Lee
2022	"Gatal"	Janna Nick

== Discography ==
=== Soundtrack appearance ===
Year	Song title	Notes
2015	"Tak Pernah" (with Nur Fathia)	Dia Isteri Luar Biasa OST

== Brand Ambassador ==
- Toyota Vios
- Bulan Bintang
- VANZO
- Nivea
- Nescafé

== Awards and nominations ==
Year	Award	Category	Nominated work	Result	Ref.
2013	17th Skrin Awards	Best Supporting Actor – Drama	Perempuan Itu Ibuku	Nominated	
2014	1st Kuala Lumpur Drama Festival Awards	Choice Ensemble Cast	Ruby	Nominated	
2014	26th Malaysia Film Festival	Most Promising Actor	Ular	Nominated	
2015	2nd Kuala Lumpur Drama Festival Awards	Choice Actor	Menjinak Ombak	Nominated	
2015	2nd Kuala Lumpur Drama Festival Awards	Choice On-screen Couple (with Risteena Munim)	Menjinak Ombak	Nominated	
2015	2nd Kuala Lumpur Drama Festival Awards	Choice Ensemble Cast	Menjinak Ombak	Nominated	
2015	2nd P. Ramlee Tribute Awards	Best Actor	Engkau Laksana Bulan	Nominated	
2015	28th Bintang Popular Berita Harian Awards	Most Popular New Male Artist	—N/a	Nominated	
2015	28th Bintang Popular Berita Harian Awards	Most Stylish Male Artist	—N/a	Nominated	
2015	Melodi Awards	Choice Male Artist	—N/a	Nominated	
2015	19th Skrin Awards	Best Actor – Drama	Jalan Taubat	Nominated	
2015	EH! Malaysia	EH! Top 20	—N/a	Won	
2016	3rd Kuala Lumpur Drama Festival Awards	Choice Actor	Asam Pedas Untuk Dia	Nominated	
2016	29th Bintang Popular Berita Harian Awards	Most Popular Selfie Artist	—N/a	Nominated	
2016	Seri Angkasa Awards	Best Actor (TV)	Abang Beduk	Nominated	
2016	Seri Angkasa Awards	Best Comedy Actor (TV)	Abang Beduk	Nominated	
2016	Stail EH! Awards	Most Sexy Male Celebrities	—N/a	Nominated	
2016	Telenovela Awards	Best Actor	Dia Isteri Luar Biasa	Nominated	
2017	4th Kuala Lumpur Drama Festival Awards	Choice Actor	7 Hari Mencintaiku	Won	
2017	4th Kuala Lumpur Drama Festival Awards	Choice On-screen Couple (with Siti Saleha)	7 Hari Mencintaiku	Won	
2017	4th MeleTOP ERA Awards	MeleTOP TV Actor	7 Hari Mencintaiku	Nominated	
2017	4th MeleTOP ERA Awards	MeleTOP Couple (with Tya Adnan)	—N/a	Nominated	
2017	30th Bintang Popular Berita Harian Awards	Most Popular TV Actor	—N/a	Nominated	
2017	30th Bintang Popular Berita Harian Awards	Favourite On-screen Couple (Drama) (with Siti Saleha)	7 Hari Mencintaiku	Nominated	
2017	Telenovela Awards	Best Actor	Cik Cinderella dan Encik Tengku	Nominated	
2018	5th Kuala Lumpur Drama Festival Awards	Choice Actor	Andainya Takdir	Nominated	
2018	5th Kuala Lumpur Drama Festival Awards	Choice Antagonist Actor	Andainya Takdir	Won	
2018	22nd Skrin Awards	Best Supporting Actor – Drama	Kasih Seorang Ayah	Nominated	
2018	Telenovela Awards	Best Actor	Gaduh-Gaduh Sayang	Nominated	
2019	32nd Bintang Popular Berita Harian Awards	Most Popular Antagonist Actor	Andainya Takdir 2	Won	
2019	23rd Skrin Awards	Best Supporting Actor – Drama	Remuk	Nominated	
2019	Telenovela Awards	Best Actor	Split TV Series	Won	
2020	33rd Bintang Popular Berita Harian Awards	Most Popular TV Actor	—N/a	Nominated	
2020	33rd Bintang Popular Berita Harian Awards	Favourite On-screen Couple (Drama) (with Hannah Delisha)	30 Pesanan Suara	Nominated	
2020	33rd Bintang Popular Berita Harian Awards	Favourite On-screen Couple (Drama) (with Emma Maembong)	Kerana Dia Manusia Biasa	Nominated	
2020	33rd Bintang Popular Berita Harian Awards	Favourite On-screen Couple (Drama) (with Nabila Razali)	Pesan Pada Hati	Nominated	
2020	Telenovela Awards	Most Popular Actor	Kerana Dia Manusia Biasa	Nominated	
2020	Telenovela Awards	Favourite On-screen Couple (with Emma Maembong)	Kerana Dia Manusia Biasa	Nominated	
2021	34th Bintang Popular Berita Harian Awards	Most Popular TV Actor	—N/a	Nominated	
2021	34th Bintang Popular Berita Harian Awards	Favourite On-screen Couple (Drama) (with Siti Saleha)	7 Hari Mencintaiku 2	Nominated	
2021	Drama Sangat Awards	Best Actor	7 Hari Mencintaiku 2	Nominated	
2021	Drama Sangat Awards	Best On-screen Couple (with Siti Saleha)	7 Hari Mencintaiku 2	Won	
2021	Telenovela Awards	Best Actor	7 Hari Mencintaiku 2	Nominated	
2021	Telenovela Awards	Most Popular Actor	7 Hari Mencintaiku 2	Nominated	
2021	Telenovela Awards	Favourite On-screen Couple (with Siti Saleha)	7 Hari Mencintaiku 2	Nominated	
2022	Telenovela Awards	Most Popular Actor	Rindu Awak Separuh Nyawa	Nominated	
2022	Telenovela Awards	Favourite On-screen Couple (with Uqasha Senrose)	Rindu Awak Separuh Nyawa	Nominated	
2023	Drama Sangat Awards	Best Actor	7 Hari Mencintaiku 3	Nominated	
2023	Drama Sangat Awards	Most Popular Actor	7 Hari Mencintaiku 3	Nominated	
2023	Drama Sangat Awards	Best On-screen Couple (with Siti Saleha)	7 Hari Mencintaiku 3	Nominated	
2023	Content Asia Awards 2023	Best Male Lead in a TV Programme / Series Made in Asia	Andai Itu Takdirnya	Nominated	
