= Samransak Kram =

Thai-Malaysian footballer

Personal information
- Full name: Samransak s/o Kram
- Date of birth: 10 November 1985 (age 40)
- Place of birth: Alor Star, Kedah, Malaysia
- Position: Forward

Team information
- Current team: Kuala Lumpur FA

Youth career
- 2003: Kedah FA President Cup

Senior career*
Years	Team	Apps	(Gls)
2005–2010	Kedah FA		
2011	Perlis FA		

International career
2006–	Malaysia U-23	13	(0)
2006–2007	Malaysia	6	(0)
- * Club domestic league appearances and goals

Samransak Kram (born 10 November 1983, Alor Star, Kedah) is a Thai-Malaysian footballer currently playing as a striker for Perlis FA and a former Malaysia national team. He is the brother of Manopsak Kram.

== Career ==
Born as a Siamese native, nicknamed 'Sam', Samransak started his football career with Sultan Abdul Hamid College schoolboy and promoted to the Kedah FA President Cup before Mohd Azraai Khor Abdullah brought him into the senior squad starting from 2005.

Samransak made his international debut against Indonesia in 2006 Merdeka Tournament. He also played in 2006 Asian Games with Malaysia under-23. In 2007, Samransak made his first appearances in ASEAN Football Championship. However, Malaysia only manage to reach the semifinal losing to Singapore on penalty shoot-out.

In 2007 Merdeka Tournament, Samransak help Malaysia to win the cup after defeating Myanmar 3–1. He also take part in 2007 SEA Games and 2008 Olympic games qualification.
