= Marsha Milan =

Malaysian singer, host and actress

Marsha Milan ADK
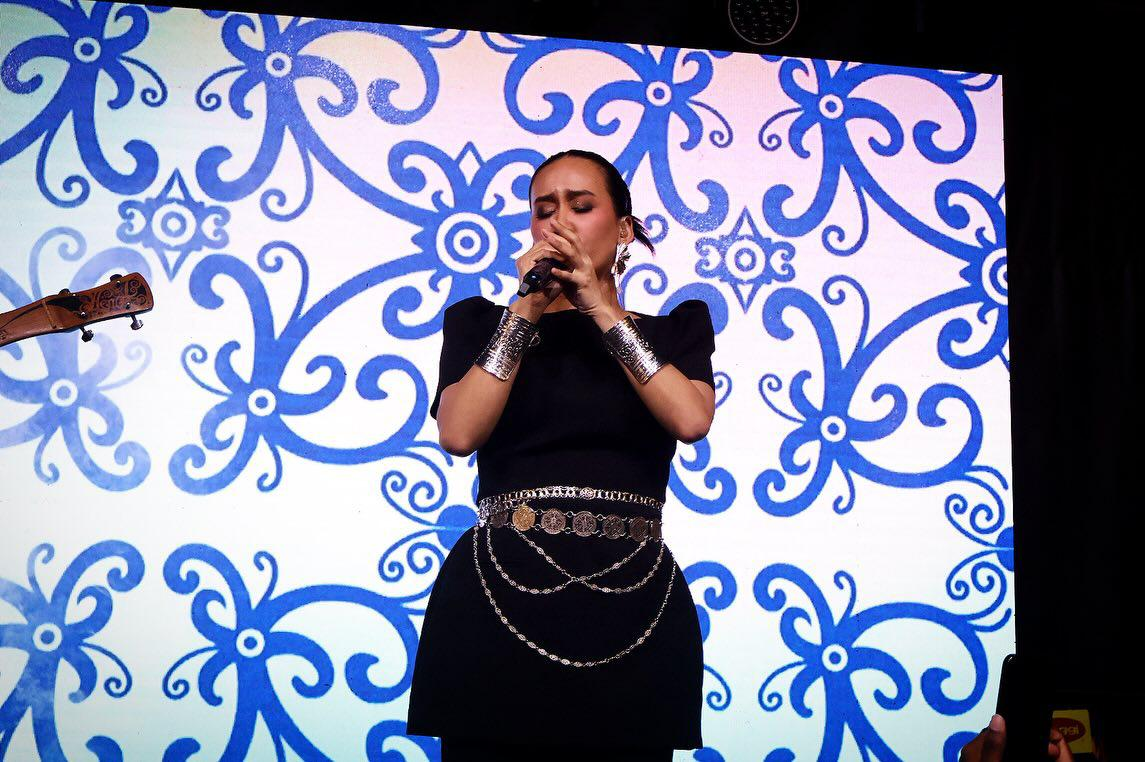
- Milan at the Borneo Native Festival 2026
- Born: Marsha Milan Londoh; 6 December 1985 (age 40); Berrien Springs, Michigan, U.S.
- Occupations: Singer; Actress; Musician; Model; Television Host
- Years active: 2005–present
- Height: 162 cm (5 ft 4 in)
- Spouse: Mohamed Shaiful Nizam Ismail (m. 2015)
- Relatives: Linda Nanuwil (cousin)
- Musical career
- Genres: Pop
- Instrument: Vocals

Marsha Milan Londoh (born 6 December 1985) is a Malaysian singer and actress. She gained fame for being a contestant in the third season of the Malaysian reality show singing contest Akademi Fantasia, in which she won fourth place.

In 2013, Marsha dubbed the voice of Elsa in the Malaysian dub of Disney's Frozen and sang the title track "Bebaskan", (the Malay version of "Let It Go"), the second Disney film dubbed in Malay for cinema release after Tarzan (1999).

On 17 February 2025, Marsha won the Anugerah Juara Lagu (AJL) 39th edition as her song Hening Rindu, created by Ikhwan Fatanna and Wan Saleh with lyrics written by Ikhwan Fatanna, triumphed.

== Personal life ==
Milan is a Kadazan-Dusun from Tamparuli, Sabah. Linda Nanuwil, who was the first runner-up of season 2 of Akademi Fantasia, is her cousin.

Milan was raised a Christian before converting to Islam in December 2015 before marriage.

== Reality television ==
=== Akademi Fantasia ===
Milan was one of the competitors in Akademi Fantasia Season 3. During the Prelude concert, she failed to perform as she was diagnosed with sore throat. The jury panel was in consensus that her failure to participate in the concert should automatically disqualify her. Nevertheless, she was called back to perform again in AF3's first week concert, and she welcome sign in academy with Mawi through AF SERAP.

Akademi Fantasia season 3 performances and results
Week	Song	Original artist	Result
Week 1 (June 4, 2005)	Awan Yang Terpilu	Ning Baizura	Safe
Week 2 (June 11, 2005)	Ingin Bersamamu	Syafinaz	Safe
Week 3 (June 18, 2005)	Lelaki Idaman	Melly Goeslaw	Safe
Week 4 (June 25, 2005)	Tunggu Sekejap	P. Ramlee	Safe
Week 5 (July 2, 2005)	Bossanova	Saloma	Safe
Week 6 (July 9, 2005)	Destiny	Jim Brickman	Safe
Week 7 (July 16, 2005)	Jambatan Tamparuli	Justin Lusah	Safe
Week 8 (July 23, 2005)	Cobalah Untuk Setia	Krisdayanti	Safe
Week 9 (July 30, 2005)	Ku Pendam Sebuah Duka	Khadijah Ibrahim	Safe
Week 10 (August 7, 2005)	Manusia	Sheila Majid	Second-runner-up
Week 10 (August 7, 2005)	Untuk Terakhir Kali	Marsha	Second-runner-up

=== AF Megastar 2017 ===
In 2017, Milan joined the first reboot of Akademi Fantasia, dubbed AF Megastar. This is a singing competition for Akademi Fantasia alumni. Despite not winning the competition, Milan advanced to the grand finals and won a subsidiary award, Anugerah Terlajak Megastar, with prize money of RM 10,000.

== Discography ==
=== Extended play ===
Title	Album details	Tracks
Yang Pertama	Release date: 2011; Language: Malay; Label：ALIBI Music	Track listing: 1. Bila; 2. Janji; 3. Ruang Kedua (feat. Julian Cely); 4. Tak Perlu Selamanya; 5. Bersama Kita

=== Singles ===
Year	Title	Notes
2005	Untuk Terakhir Kali	
2007	Yang Mana	
2008	Sayang	Featuring Ajai
2008	Kerna	
2009	Bila Aku Cinta	
2009	Yang Terbaik	Released on the compilation album Hitman by KRU Music
2010	Ruang Kedua (featuring Julian Cely)	
2010	Bersama Kita	Soundtrack for TV series K.I.T.A
2010	Bila	
2013	Bebaskan	Malay version of Disney's Frozen soundtrack
2015	Ku Tinggalkan Cinta	
2017	Hilang	
2018	Sumandak Sabah	Duet with Velvet Aduk
2018	Ku Bersumpah	Duet with Qody
2019	Bimbang	Soundtrack for TV series Nur, season 2
2019	Oi Gaman	Duet with Velvet Aduk
2020	Hello Hello	Soundtrack for TV series Pink Smile
2021	Cinta	
2022	Kembali Terang	
2023	Ilusi	Duet with Hazama

== Filmography ==
=== Film ===
Year	Title	Role	Notes
2006	Misi 1511		
2008	Saus Kacang	Mae	Indonesian production
2009	Senario the Movie Episode 2: Beach Boys	Zuraidah	
2010	Magika	Puteri Santubong	
2010	4 Madu	Zarra	
2011	Cun!	Siti Senjakala	
2012	Ngorat	Marsha	
2012	Kahwin 5	Mimi	
2013	Frozen	Elsa (voice)	Malaysian version
2015	Jwanita	Nona	
2017	Pak Pong	Suri	
2018	7ujuh	Suri	
2023	Rahsia	Melor	
2024	Danum	Sakinah	

=== Telemovies ===
- 2005 – Rumah Terbuka AF3
- 2005 – Gitu-gitu Raya
- 2008 – Besan vs Madu
- 2008 – 5 saat
- 2009 – Beautiful Maria
- 2009 – Cinta Meriam Buluh
- 2009 – Marah-marah Sayang
- 2009 – Pun Pun
- 2010 – Takdir
- 2010 – Kum Kum
- 2011 – Ekspres Dania
- 2011 – Hantu Susu
- 2012 – Hantu Susu Kembali
- 2017 – Terobek Raya

=== TV series ===
- 2006 – Kirana
- 2008 – Mega Sekeping Hati
- 2009 – Korban 44
- 2010 – Hotel Mania
- 2010 – K.I.T.A
- 2010 – Dottie
- 2010 – Salon
- 2010 – Awan Dania 3
- 2010 – Seribu Kali Cinta
- 2011 – Asmara 2
- 2011 – Kum Kum the series
- 2011 – Dunia Kita
- 2011 – 24 hari sebelum mencari cinta
- 2012 – Bicara hati
- 2012 – Mihrab Cinta
- 2012 – Berita Hangit
- 2013 – Duri Di Hati
- 2013 – Benci VS Cinta
- 2015 – Keluarga Pontimau
- 2017 – Oh My Pondok (sitcom)
- 2017 – 3 Dara Kg.Com
- 2018 - Bimbi & Bonni Misi 007
- 2021 – Rindu Awak Separuh Nyawa - Nurul Huda
- 2022 – Sepahtu Reunion Live
- 2022 – The Maid 2

=== Webseries ===
- 2007 – Kerana Karina 1
- 2008 – Kerana Karina 2
- 2008 – Kerana Karina 3

=== Television hosting ===
- Mentor Millenia 2016 (TV3)
- Mentor Millenia 2017 (TV3)
- Teroka Lokal (2020) (Naura HD)

== Awards and nominations ==
Year	Award	Category	Nominated work	Result
2005	Akademi Fantasia 3	Finalist	Marsha Milan Londoh	3rd runner-up
2006	Anugerah Bintang Popular Berita Harian 19	Penyanyi Wanita Baru Paling Popular	Marsha Milan Londoh	Nominated
2006	Anugerah Industri Muzik 13	Best Promising Artists	Marsha Milan Londoh	Nominated
2009	Anugerah Industri Muzik 16	Best Vocal Performance in a Duet Song	Sayang (with Ajai)	Nominated
2009	Shout! Awards	Hot Chick Award	Marsha Milan Londoh	Nominated
2014	Anugerah Industri Muzik 21	Best Vocal Performance in a Duet Song	Satu Rasa (with Zarul Umbrella)	Nominated
2025	Ibu Zain Awards	Woman Of The Arts	Marsha Milan Londoh	Won
2025	ContentAsia Awards	Best Sounds Design	Hening Rindu	Won

Year	Title	Event	Category	Results	Notes
2022	Anugerah Juara Lagu 36	Song Championship Malaysia Award 2022	Cinta	Won	Runner-up & Best Performance
2025	Anugerah Juara Lagu 39	Song Championship Malaysia Award 2025	Hening Rindu	Won	1st Place
2026	Anugerah Juara Lagu 40	Song Championship Malaysia Award 2026	Tangisan Seorang Pendosa	Won	Best Vocal

== Honours ==
- Sabah
  - Member of the Order of Kinabalu (A.D.K.) - 2024
