= System Shock (band) =

- Origin: Norrköping, Sweden / Athens, Greece
- Genres: Sci-Fi Metal, Melodic Death Metal, Power Metal
- Years active: 2003–present
- Labels: Karmageddon Media, Mausoleum Records, Sleaszy Rider Records
- Members: Dimitris Ioakimoglu; Lukas Bergis; John McRis; Toni Paananen

System Shock is a Swedish/Greek heavy metal band. Formed by guitarist Lukas Bergis in 2003, the group has released three albums.

== History ==
System Shock was formed in Sweden by guitarist/producer Lukas Bergis and shortly thereafter released its debut through Karmageddon Media. The drums on the recording were played by George Kollias, who shortly thereafter joined Nile. Two band members joined Athens based gothic metallers Nightfall in 2010. The band has been reported to be working on its new album with a release date in mid-2013 The band describe their music as Sci-Fi Metal, while lyrics often refer to themes such as space exploration and science fiction. In 2013 the band confirmed that Anorimoi guitarist, John McRis, who had been credited as a recording engineer in their latest two releases and had been rehearsing with the band since 2009 would join as a full-time member, while Tony Paananen was confirmed as their new drummer.

== Members ==
Current members

- Dimitris Ioakimoglu - vocals (2004–present)
- Lukas Bergis - guitars (2004–present)
- John McRis - guitars (2009–present)
- Toni Paananen - drums (2012–present)

Former members

- George Kollias - drums (2003–2005)
- George Baliousis - drums (2005–2006)
- Kim Gustavsson - bass, drums (2004–2009)
- Stathis Cassios - keyboards (2003–2009)
- Evan Hensley - bass (2008–2009)
- Jonas Wennerqvist - guitars (2008–2009)

== Discography ==
- Arctic Inside (2004)
- Escape (2006)
- Urban Rage (2009)
