= Shu Jie Lam =

Malaysian-Chinese research chemist

Shu Jie Lam is a Malaysian-Chinese research chemist specialising in biomolecular engineering. She is researching star polymers designed to attack superbugs as antibiotics.
