= List of people from Kelantan =

State flag of Kelantan

The following is a list of prominent people who were born in or have lived in the Malaysian state of Kelantan, or for whom Kelantan is a significant part of their identity.

== A ==
- Ahmad Khalish Rusyaidee ("d4v41") – professional esports player
- Ahmad Muin Yaacob – convicted murderer
- Asri Muda – politician, born in Kota Bharu
- Aedy Ashraf - actor

== F ==
- Fizo Omar - Actor

== M ==
- Mustapa Mohamed – politician, born in Bachok
- Muhammad Haikal - badminton player

== N ==
- Nelydia Senrose – actress, born in Kota Bharu
- Nik Safiah Karim – linguist, born in Kota Bharu

== R ==
- Rozman Jusoh – odd-job labourer, convicted drug trafficker

== T ==
- Tan Seng Giaw – politician, born in Kota Bharu
- Tengku Razaleigh Hamzah - politician, born in Kota Bharu
