= R3MIX =

Remix album by Sara Jorge
- Genre: Pop, dance, Europop
- Label: Purple City
- Producer: Rob Davis; Gary Clark, Ash Howes; Martin Harrington; Gary Barlow; Eliot Kennedy

R3MIX is the first studio album by British pop singer Sara Jorge, released on 5 March 2007.

"Shock To The System", Jorge's first solo single, was released on 21 March 2005, and reached number one in the UK dance and club charts. "Dirty Business", released on 5 September 2005, was the second single to be released from R3MIX.

In early 2006, Jorge released her third single, "Beautiful World". This was her third consecutive number 1 single on the UK dance and club charts. The next single from the forthcoming debut album R3MIX is "Keep It Comin".

== Track listing ==
This track listing is taken from the first promotional album called Electro-Cute, renamed Beautiful World and later R3MIX.

1. "Dirty Business" (SoulSeekerz Vs BJ Bomba Remix) second single
2. "Beautiful World" (M-Factor Remix)
3. "Shock to the System" (Mantronix Remix) first single
4. "Keep It Comin'" (Stellar Browne Remix) fourth single
5. "Victim of Love" (Original Mix)
6. "Let Your Heart Go Free" (Judge Jules Remix)
7. "L.U.2.D." (Bluescreen Remix)
8. "Twenty-Four Heaven" (Titan 3 Remix)
9. "One Good Thing" (Titan 3 Remix)
10. "Losing Battle" (Veto Benito Remix)
11. "To Be Loved" (DJ Bomba Remix) B-side to "Beautiful World"
12. "Let Your Heart Go Free" (Chilled Butterfly Remix)
13. "Beautiful World" (Solasso Remix) third single

== Sources ==
- "Sara Jorge: The Electro-Cute Club". Confirmed tracks. Archived from the original on January 5, 2013.
- "Channel 4". Sara Jorge on T4.
- "Sara Jorge - R3mix".
