= Shock System =

Rock band from Malaysia

- (From left:) Lando, Xumb, Luncai, Stixx, Scravius

Background information
- Origin: Bandar Baru Bangi, Selangor, Malaysia
- Genres: Alternative, experimental, funk, grunge, hardcore, hard rock, hip hop, metal, progressive, punk rock, rap, rock
- Years active: 2000–2008
- Label: Independent
- Members: Xumb; Stixx; Scravius; Duhlee; Luncai; Lando
- Past members: Zamir; Edika; Dhan

Shock System was an independent rock band from Malaysia. Their music ranged from a mixture of metallic hardcore with rap-rock elements and soaring progressive rock bits. All of their recordings were released independently.

With the release of Peaceful Demonstration EP in 2003 and Stagnantation Disorder EP in 2005, they garnered attention and established themselves in the burgeoning Kuala Lumpur underground scene. They're also avid supporters of Food Not Bombs Kuala Lumpur.

== Reviews ==
“Progressive in its collective vision, always working for something a bit different from the rest of the herd.” - Ricecooker Zine, Apr ‘06

“Definitely politically-charged tracks for the thinking.” - Junk Magazine, Dec ‘06

“Interesting combination through creative riffs unifying a potentially powerful musical unit.” - ROTTW Magazine, June ‘07

“They certainly have something important to say, which amidst the meaningless tripe on record shelves these days, is worthy endeavour indeed.” - Channel V's AMP, June ‘07

“Sounds like Alice In Chains Unplugged!” - Azmyl Yunor on Shock System's acoustic set at the Troubaganger Show, May ’06

== Discography ==
Logo

- Peaceful Demonstration EP (2003, Independent:MALAYSIA)
- Stagnantation Disorder EP (2005, Independent:MALAYSIA)
- Deconstruct: The Discography (2012, Independent:MALAYSIA)

== Appearances ==
- Come Together compilation - various artists (2005, Independent:MALAYSIA)
