= Loh Boon Siew =

Malaysian businessman (1915–1995)

Yang Berbahagia Tan Sri Loh Boon Siew PSM DMPN JSM KMN
- 駱文秀
- Born: 1915; Hui'an County, Fujian, Republic of China (now China)
- Died: 16 February 1995 (aged 79–80); Malaysia

Loh Boon Siew

Chinese name
- Traditional Chinese: 駱文秀
- Hanyu Pinyin: Luò Wénxiù
- Jyutping: Lok3 Man4 Sau3
- Hokkien POJ: Lo̍h Bûn-siù
- Tâi-lô: Lo̍h Bûn-siù

Loh Boon Siew (Chinese: 駱文秀; pinyin: Luò Wénxiù; Jyutping: Lok3 Man4 Sau3; Pe̍h-ōe-jī: Lo̍h Bûn-siù; 1915 – 1995) also known by locals as "Mr Honda", was a Penangite tycoon and the first sole distributor of Honda motorcycles in Malaysia.

== Early life ==
Loh Boon Siew was born in Hui'an County, Fujian, China. He spent his childhood collecting pig dung (used as fuel) to make a living. At the age of 12, he arrived in Penang with five friends, among them Loh Poh Heng and Loh Say Bee. He had no formal education and could only speak in his mother tongue of Hokkien.

== Business ==
Boon Siew first worked at his father's mechanic shop, sending money back to family in China. At night, Boon Siew also worked as a bus washer. At age 18, Boon Siew purchased 8 buses using his $2,000 in savings and ran a bus service. Within the next seven years, his bus fleet grew to 40 vehicles, allowing him to also open a spare vehicle parts shop. In 1942, during World War II, his money was confiscated by the invading Japanese army. After World War II, he started selling bicycles, tires and motorcycle accessories, and soon he expanded his business to used cars, transports and buses.

In the 1950s, Boon Siew went into property development with his friends Say Bee and Poh Heng by building residential villas in Taman Saw Kit in Penang. His work is continued by his Boon Siew Group.

During a visit to Japan in 1958, Boon Siew found out about Honda motorcycles. He ordered twelve units for sale in Malaysia, gifting the first of these motorcycles to one of his friends.

In 1963, Boon Siew arranged to meet with Mr. Soichiro Honda, the Honda Super Cub's creator, and quickly convinced him to set up a Honda subsidiary in Malaysia.

The first Malaysian Honda showroom was set up on Pitt Street in Penang, very near the home of Boon Siew. The Japanese Honda Motor Co Ltd soon appointed Boon Siew the sole distributor for Honda motorbikes in the country, as the first 50 units of Honda 4-stroke Cub were being imported into Malaysia.

A factory was built in Penang to assemble the Honda Cub and the Honda motorcycle assembled in Malaysia was renamed the Boon Siew Honda. The Honda Cub became the bestselling motorcycle in Malaysia and Boon Siew was recognized as the first person to bring the Honda Cub motorcycles into Southeast Asia. The popular Cantonese word Cub 仔 (transcribed as "kapchai" in informal Malay), which means "small (Honda) Cub" and is now a generic for small underbone motorcycles in Malaysia, originates from the Honda Cub.

Boon Siew also played a role in the brief merger between Kwong Wah Yit Poh and The Star (Malaysia) in 1974, and helped with the establishment of the Lam Wah Ee Hospital and the Penang Old Folks Home.

Unlike other tycoons, Boon Siew was known for always going out without security, which was especially notable due to a rising trend of ransom kidnapping in Penang during the early 1990s.

He died at the age of 79 on 16 February 1995. To memorialize his contributions to the automotive industry, a road called Jalan Loh Boon Siew was named after him in George Town, Penang.

== Death of son ==
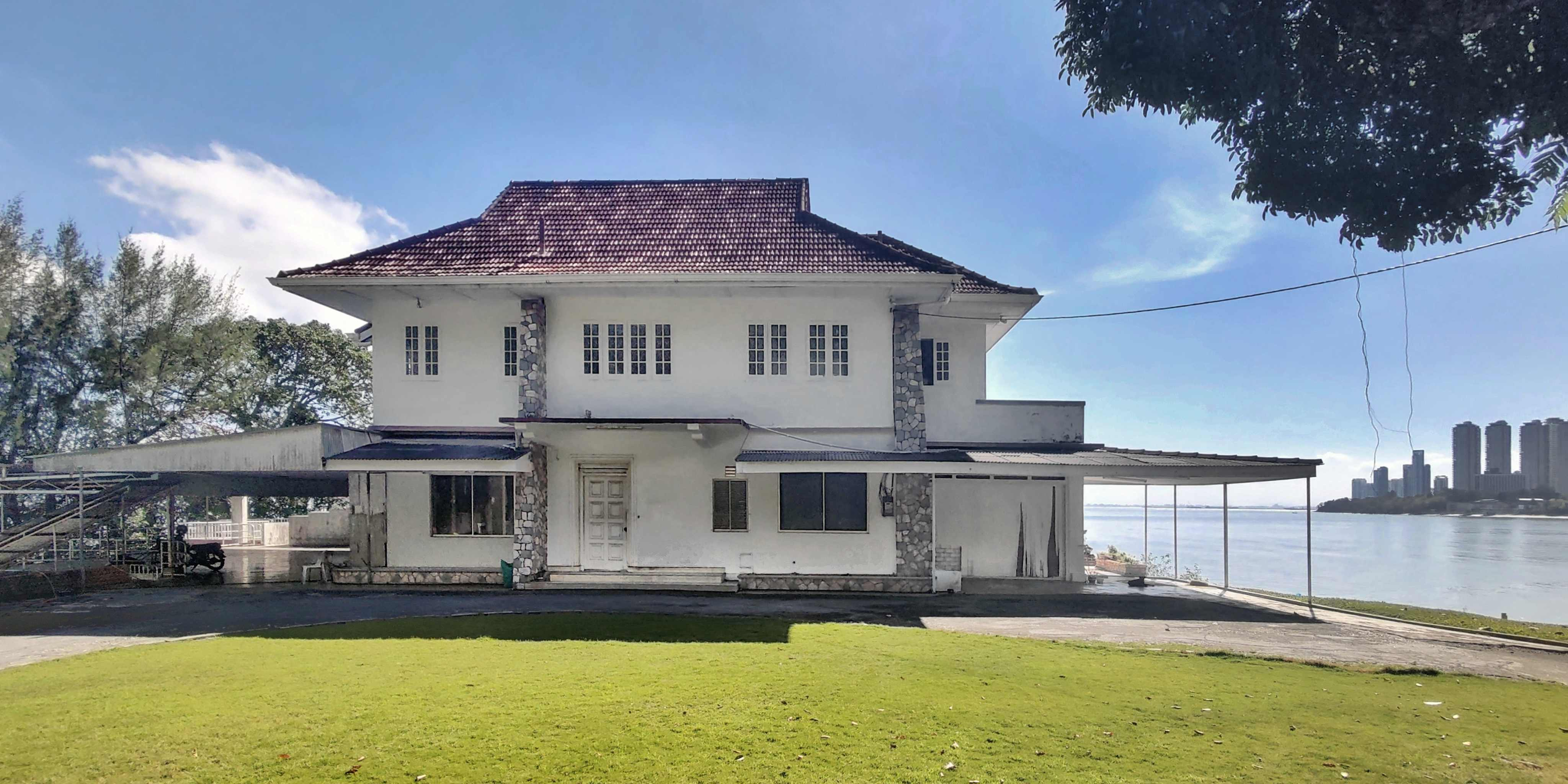
The former Boon Siew Villa at Shamrock Beach on Batu Ferringhi Road in Penang

On 24 February 1987, the body of Loh Boon Siew's adopted son, Loh Kah Kheng, aged 39, was found on his bedroom floor at the former Boon Siew Villa at Shamrock Beach on Batu Ferringhi Road. He had telephone wires coiled around his neck and binding his hands, and legs tucked behind his back.

According to police, Loh Kah Kheng had spent the prior day with his wife Shirley Yeap and brother-in-law Jeffrey Yeap, the latter of whom was initially detained since he was the only other known person at the house at the time. He was released for lack of evidence and accused responding officers of tampering with the deceased's remains. The death is believed to have been a murder, although the possibility of suicide was also rumored. Boon Siew issued a RM 500,000 reward for information, but the case remains unsolved.

== Honours ==
- Malaysia
  - Commander of the Order of Loyalty to the Crown of Malaysia (PSM) – Tan Sri (1988)
  - Companion of the Order of Loyalty to the Crown of Malaysia (JSM) (1976)
  - Officer of the Order of the Defender of the Realm (KMN) (1967)
- Penang
  - Companion of the Order of the Defender of State (DMPN) – Dato' (1977)
