= Choong Chin Liang =

Malaysian Chinese businessman, philanthropist and Justice of the Peace

Datuk' Choong Chin Liang, DPMP, PMP, JP (1919–1998) was a Malaysian Chinese businessman, philanthropist and Justice of the Peace from Ipoh, Perak, who was known to Malaysians as the "Heart Man of Ipoh" due to his philanthropy and his long involvement with the Ipoh Lions Club Heart Fund. He was known to Ipoh Residents as one of the most charitable individuals in the city and was involved in numerous non-profit organizations. Choong dedicated his wealth and industry to the many causes that he supported.

Datuk Choong was the only charter member of the Lions Club of Ipoh with the most number of years of service and was also District Governor of District 308 (Malaysia, Singapore, Brunei).

The formation of Multiple District 308 was sent by the late DG Dato' Choong Chin Liang to Lions Club International in the fiscal year of 1982/1983.

Dato' Choong was married to Datin Molly Choong and had 4 children, Choong Moh Guan, Choong Moh Huat, Choong Moh Kheng, and Choong Gaik Li.

Choong was also the Founder of Chye Hin Construction Company, which later renamed itself to Mudajaya Construction. Mudajaya Construction was one of the companies that now form IJM Corporation Berhad, one of the largest public listed companies on the Kuala Lumpur Stock Exchange. Gamuda Berhad was also once a subsidiary of Mudajaya. Mudajaya Group is itself also a noted construction company publicly listed on the KLSE.
