= Proton Persona (2016) =

Proton Persona (third generation)
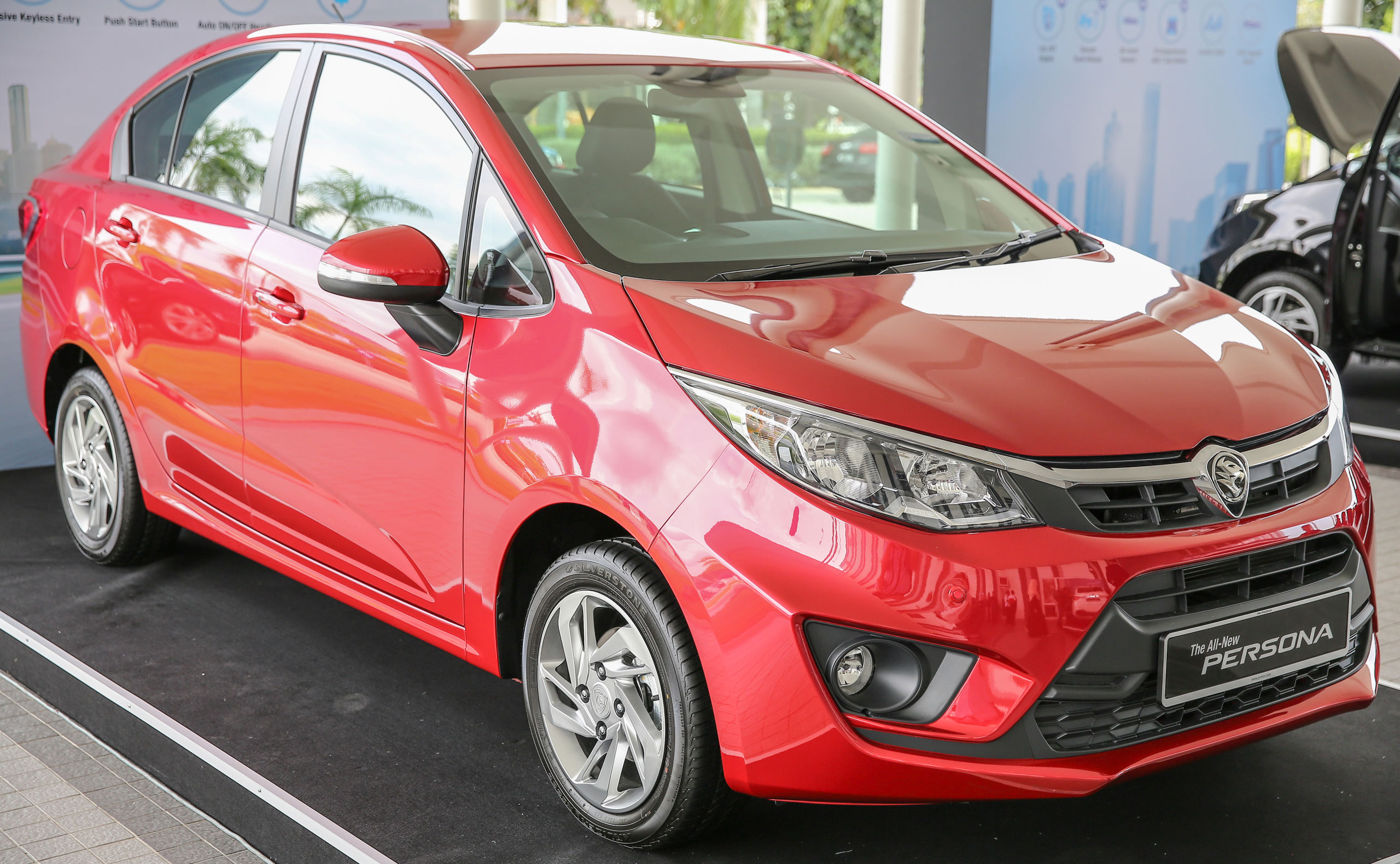

Overview
- Manufacturer: Proton
- Model code: BH; P2-31A
- Production: August 2016 – 2026
- Assembly: Malaysia: Proton City, Perak (PTMSB)
- Designer: Azlan Othman

Body and chassis
- Class: Subcompact car (B)
- Body style: 4-door saloon
- Layout: Front-engine, front-wheel drive
- Related: Proton Iriz

Powertrain
- Engine: 1.6 L VVT S4PH DOHC I4
- Transmission: 5-speed manual (2016–2021); CVT

Dimensions
- Wheelbase: 2,555 mm (100.6 in)
- Length: 4,366 mm (171.9 in)
- Width: 1,722 mm (67.8 in)
- Height: 1,554–1,564 mm (61.2–61.6 in)
- Kerb weight: 1,175–1,210 kg (2,590–2,668 lb)

Chronology
- Predecessor: Proton Persona (CM)
- Successor: Proton S70 (indirect)

The third-generation Proton Persona (BH), codenamed P2-31A during development, is a subcompact (B-segment) saloon engineered by the Malaysian automobile manufacturer Proton. The BH series represents the third and latest generation in the Proton Persona lineage. It was unveiled on 23 August 2016 as the successor to the CM Persona.

The BH Persona is based on an extended Proton Iriz platform and shares the latter's 1.6-litre VVT engine and basic structure, but its exterior design has been completely re-engineered to give it a distinct persona. The interior of the BH Persona is largely unchanged over the Iriz, with the main exception of the new two-tier colour scheme.

The BH Persona is one class smaller than the outgoing CM Persona, but it offers more headroom, comparable rear legroom and a significantly larger boot. The new BH is also more powerful, fuel efficient and sophisticated than the old CM. It is the latest model to carry Proton's newfound 'affordable safety' USP, and all BH Persona variants have been awarded the full five-star rating by ASEAN NCAP.

== History ==
The third generation Proton Persona (BH) was launched on 23 August 2016 at Setia City Convention Centre in Shah Alam, Malaysia. The new BH Persona is the latest Proton model to use an existing nameplate, and directly replaces the second generation Persona (CM) which was produced from mid-2007 to mid-2016. The launch of the BH Persona comes approximately two years after its sister car, the Proton Iriz.

The BH Persona shares the Iriz's platform, basic structure, powertrains and interior, but its exterior design has been completely re-engineered in an effort to distinguish itself as a stand-alone model. Proton has also made several refinements to improve fuel efficiency and reduce noise, vibration and harshness (NVH) in the 1.6-litre VVT engine. The CVT has also been refined for a smoother drive.

At launch, four variants of the new Persona were made available, namely the Standard MT, Standard CVT, Executive CVT and Premium CVT. All BH Persona variants come standard with Proton's Vehicle Dynamic Control (VDC) safety net, ECO Drive Assist, front and rear parking sensors and 15-inch alloy rims among others. The various trim levels differ mainly in terms of kit and cosmetic enhancements, and are otherwise mechanically identical with the exception of the airbag count.

The Standard and Executive variants get twin front airbags, while the Premium model adds on twin side and twin curtain airbags for a total of six. ASEAN NCAP has awarded the full five-star rating for all variants of the BH Persona.

As of 19 September 2016, Proton has received 8,000 bookings for the new Persona, of which 2,000 have been delivered. Of the 8,000 total figure, 45% were for the range topping Premium variant, contrary to Proton's original projections where the base model Standard was expected to be the best seller. Additionally, 35% of bookings were for the Carnelian Brown colour, and a further 5% were for the limited edition Premium SE model. Proton is targeting sales of between 3,000 and 4,000 units a month.

In April 2019, An updated Persona was launched at the Kuala Lumpur Convention Centre in Kuala Lumpur, Malaysia alongside the first facelift Iriz. The four variants continued to be offered.

On August 5, 2021, Proton launched the second facelifted Persona. The new Persona is available as 1.6L Standard, 1.6L Executive and 1.6L Premium CVT variants, 1.6L Standard MT has been dropped.

For export markets, Proton Persona BH was launched and sold in Brunei and Indonesia in 2017, followed by Mauritius at the end of August 2020 through its local company, Visacar & Tours Ltd., and has been planned to enter South Africa after both Proton X70 and X50 those were launched in September 2022, followed by Proton Saga in March 2023.

== Design ==
The 2016 Proton Persona shares a large majority of parts and components with the Proton Iriz, which launched in September 2014. However, with respect to design and aesthetics, Proton has intentions to market the new Persona as a bespoke, stand-alone model, as opposed to an 'Iriz Sedan'. To that effect, the transformation process from the Iriz to BH Persona is more significant than that seen previously with the Prevé and Suprima S, as well as the GEN•2 and CM Persona.

=== Exterior ===
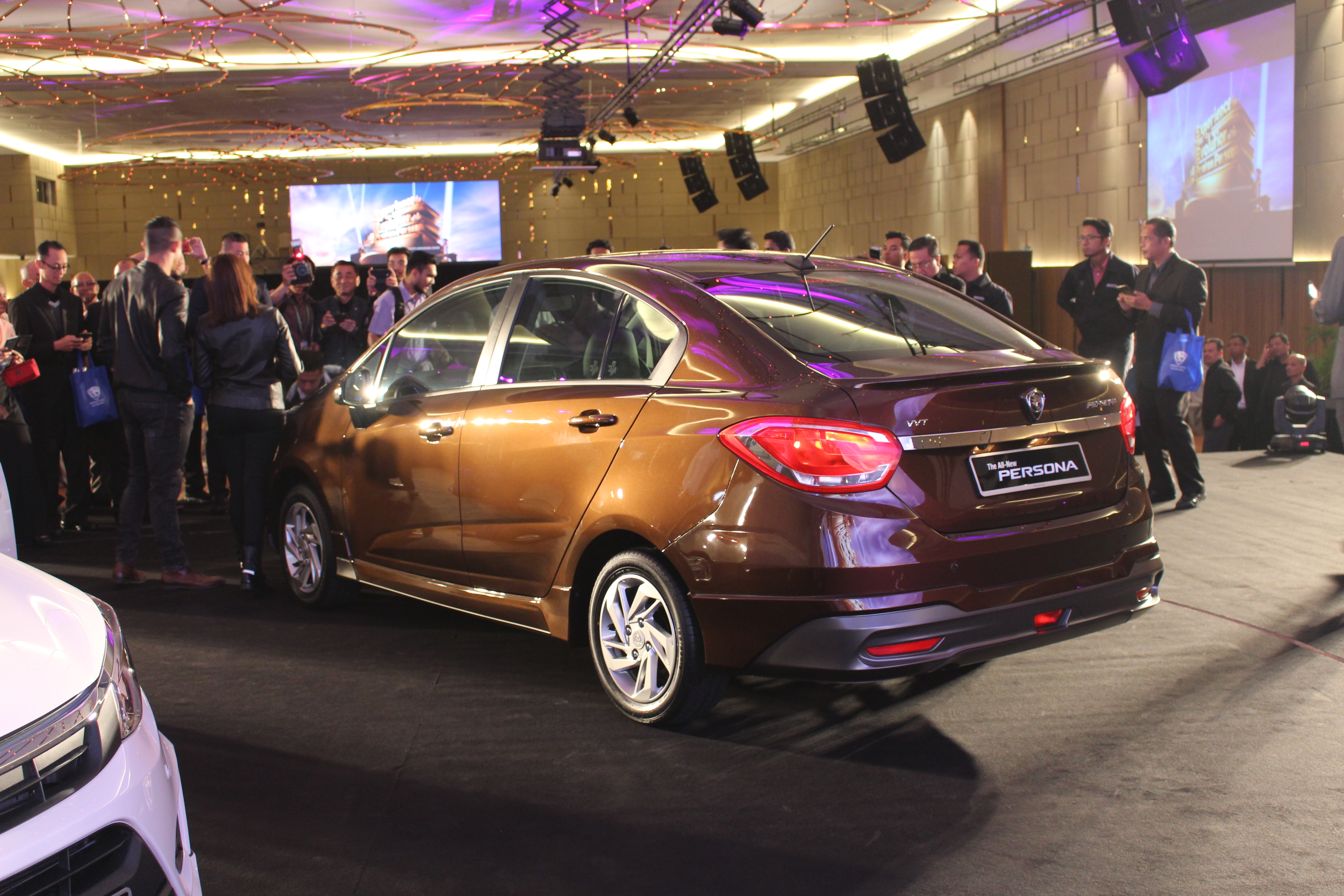
The exterior of the BH Persona is all-new, with the exception of the front doors and fenders.

The new Proton Persona measures 4,387 mm (172.7 in) long, 1,722 mm (67.8 in) wide and 1,554 mm (61.2 in) tall. The wheelbase length at 2,555 mm (100.6 in) is unchanged over the Iriz, but the rear overhang has been extended to support a large 510-litre (18 cu ft) boot, compared to just 215 litres (7.6 cu ft) in the Iriz. In terms of size comparisons, the new BH Persona is 482 mm (19.0 in) longer, 2 mm (0.079 in) wider and 4 mm (0.16 in) taller than the Iriz, and 90 mm (3.5 in) shorter, 3 mm (0.12 in) narrower and 116 mm (4.6 in) taller than the old CM Persona. Additionally, the wheelbase length of the BH is 45 mm (1.8 in) shorter than the CM, but the boot volume is 80 litres (2.8 cu ft) larger.

Despite the fact that the new BH Persona is classified as a B-segment saloon, as opposed to the outgoing C-segment CM Persona, it offers more headroom, comparable rear legroom and a significantly larger boot thanks to more efficient design and packaging. Nonetheless, the larger interior volume in the BH, made possible by short overhangs and increased height come at the expense of more balanced exterior proportions. Additionally, the new Persona is fitted with more basic gooseneck boot hinges as opposed to the old model's space saving, albeit costly twin gas strut hinges.

The new Persona shares the same basic body structure with the Iriz, but its exterior design has been completely re-engineered to give it a more distinct persona. With the exception of the windscreen, front doors, wing mirrors housings and front fenders, all other exterior body panels are unique to the BH Persona. Proton has maintained their original 'Stylish Executive' design philosophy from the CM Persona, fusing it with the newer 'Proton Wings' language first seen in the Prevé, as well as the company's new sculptured, three-dimensional badge. However, unlike the Iriz, the new Persona features more basic height-adjustable halogen reflector headlamps and bulb-lit rear lamps, in an effort to reduce costs and pricing. Daytime running lights (DRL) are also absent, but all variants get a rear fog light as standard. Both front and rear lamps have Proton lettering inserts, and the BH Persona is the first Proton saloon to feature wing mirrors that are mounted on the door panel, helping improve visibility with the addition of a front quarter glass insert.

The various cosmetic enhancements in the BH Persona are preset according to their respective trim levels. The door handles are matte black on the Standard variants, but are painted in the body colour in the Executive and Premium lines. The wing mirror housings are also matte in the Standard, but are body coloured in the Executive and incorporate a power-folding feature in the Premium. The B-pillars are body colour coded in the Standard and Executive, but are blacked out in the Premium. A rear bootlid lip spoiler is only fitted on the Executive and Premium lines.

All variants feature the same 15-inch alloy rim design, but the rims are painted grey in the Standard and Executive variants, and gloss silver in the Premium respectively. Front fog lights are only available on the Executive and Premium lines. The headlamps get a follow-me-home feature in the Executive, while the Premium adds on an automatic on/off option. Proton will also produce a limited run Premium SE variant, which is identical to the Premium in specifications, but is fitted with an all-round, dual-tone bodykit, an RM1,000 option. The BH Persona is produced in six colours, namely Carnelian Brown, Sterling Silver, Quartz Black, Fire Red, Cotton White and Graphite Grey. Certain batches of Persona are shipped with wheels from the Iriz and with latter batches, all variants has side mirrors and door handles body coloured.

The 2019 Persona key design changes include revised front fascia with Proton's new infinite weave design language with a chrome strip dubbed ethereal bow and Proton lettering on the rear as well as redesigned front and rear bumpers. For the Executive and Premium variant, in place of the front fog lamps are now LED DRL's. The wheels also sport a new design with them finished in single-tone on Standard and Executive variants and dual-tone on Premium variant. Body-coloured door handles and wing mirror housings are standard for all variants, with additional power-folding feature on Executive variant's wing mirrors, which are remained on Premium variant. Five colours are on offer: Jet Grey, Snow White, Ruby Red, Rosewood Maroon and Armour Silver.

The 2022 Persona shows off the Proton's new roundel logo, revised grille and front bumper, new designed 6-spoke wheels with similar finishing of Persona 2019, darkened LED tail lights and deleted rear fog lamps. LED headlamps, black-painted rear spoiler and black-painted roof are reserved exclusively for Premium variant, with the latter was recently changed from black to body colour. An additional new colour, Space Grey is only offered for Premium variant.

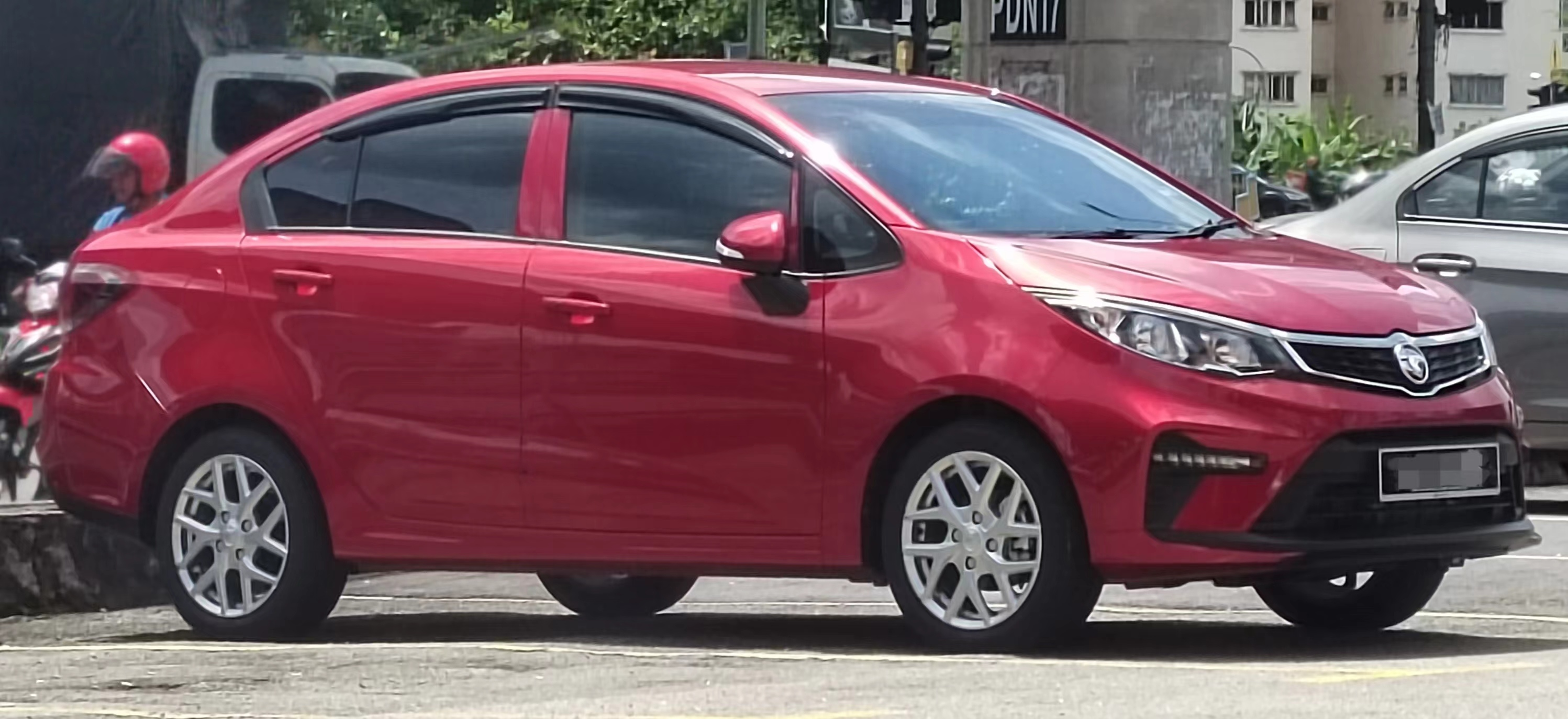
2022 Proton Persona 1.6 Executive.

=== Interior ===
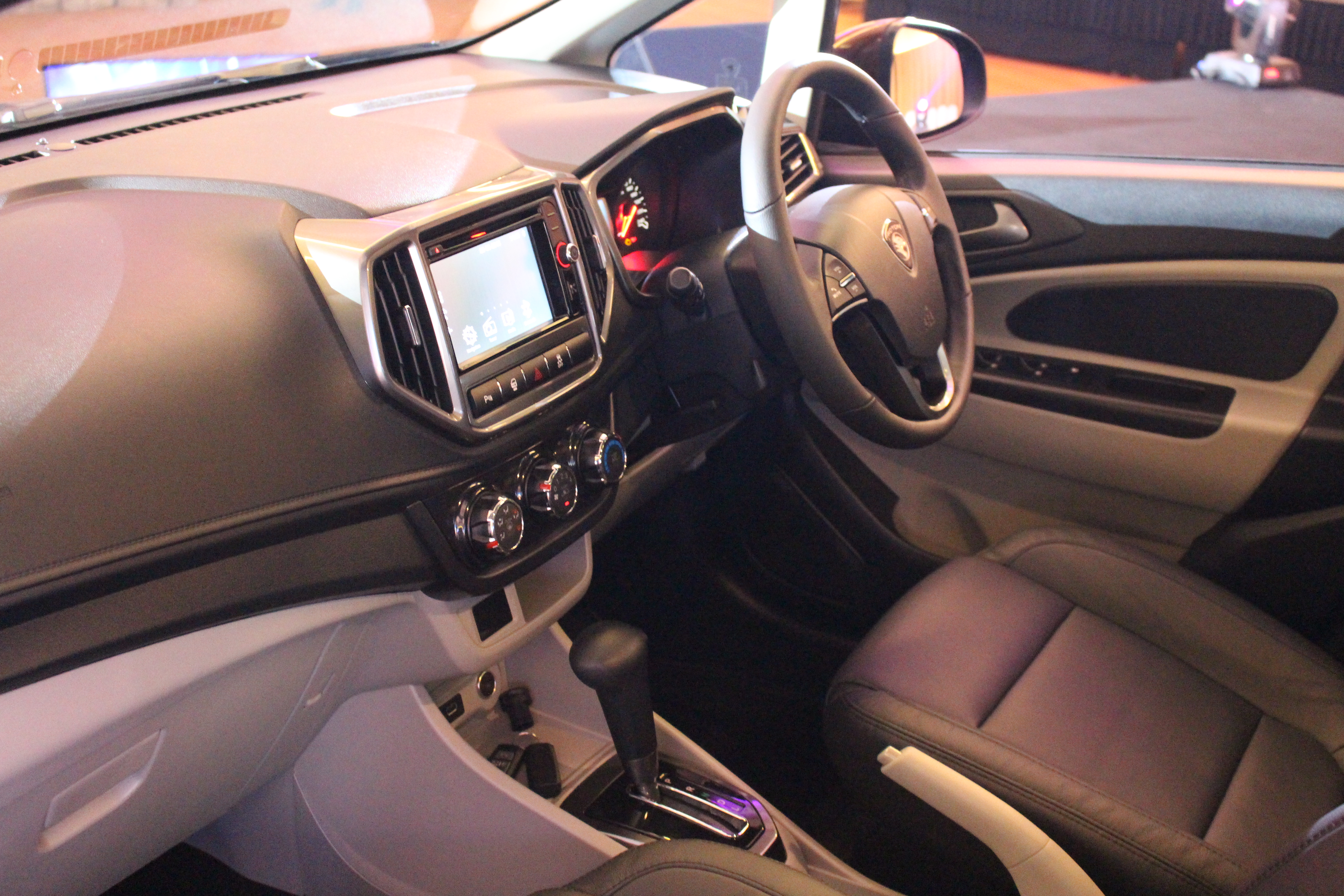
The interior of the Premium variant

The BH Persona shares the vast majority of its interior panels with the Iriz. The centre console, dashboard, steering wheel, door cards and transmission tunnel were carried over unchanged. However, Proton did introduce several minor additions and cosmetic changes, the most prominent of which being the dual-tone colour scheme, a contrast from the all-black interior of the Iriz. The lower-half of the dashboard, transmission tunnel, handbrake, cup holders, pillars and inner sections of the door cards are finished in a light grey or beige colour, while the top-half of the dashboard and outer frame of the door cards are in matte black. The new colour scheme is said to increase the impression of space and perceived quality, while also paying homage to the old CM Persona. There are ten storage compartments and seven cup holders in the BH Persona.

Proton has also fitted a new CVT gear lever with a side-mounted release switch and a headlight levelling dial which can be used to re-calibrate the front beam projection when the car is fully loaded. The driver's instrument cluster is largely unchanged over the Iriz, but it now features Proton's new ECO Drive Assist system, an indicator which lights up in green when the car is being driven in an economical manner. The speedometer and tachometer graphics are also new, and the central LCD screen is now lit in blue, compared to the Iriz's red. The instrument cluster housing is also finished in a glossy grey coat, as opposed to matte black in the Iriz.

At the back, legroom has been improved courtesy of the scalloped front seat backs and a more reclined rear bench, which can be folded in a 60:40 arrangement in the Executive and Premium lines. Proton has also improved and refined how the front and rear doors open and close, to further improve perceived quality.

All variants of the new BH Persona come standard with power-adjustable wing mirrors, all-round power windows, power locks, a multi-info instrument cluster and a free Yes 4G Wi-Fi subscription. Additionally, the steering wheel is tilt-adjustable, while the driver's seat can be adjusted for height.

The Standard variants get fabric seat upholstery and a matte centre console finishing, while the Executive model adds on fabric door trimmings and a glossy centre console finishing. The Premium is the only variant with leather seats, leather door trimmings, and a leather-wrapped steering wheel.

Three different head units are offered in the BH Persona. The Standard variants are equipped with a single-DIN head unit with radio, Bluetooth and CD/MP3 playback. The Executive model gets a larger double-DIN head unit, and steering wheel audio switches. The Premium model features an Android-based touchscreen head unit which is linked to a reverse camera, and also features GPS navigation, DVD playback, Bluetooth and iPod connectivity. The head units are paired to twin front and rear speakers in the Executive and Premium lines, and twin rear speakers in the Standard. Additionally, both Executive and Premium models have two rear USB charging ports and a key fob with remote trunk release. Passive keyless entry with push-start ignition is exclusive to the Premium.

The 2019 Persona saw a new seat pattern (new fabric for Standard variants and semi-leather fabric for both Executive and Premium variants) and the air conditioning controls markings now white only. The Standard variants features a double din like-sized head unit with capacitive buttons that are not visible without illumination. This is a similar head unit to that found in Saga, Iriz and Exora Standard. The Executive and Premium variant meanwhile has a headunit that runs GKUI with the Premium variant getting Proton's Hi Proton voice recognition feature. The Standard variants are upgraded with additional two rear USB charging ports, whereas the Executive variant is upgraded as well with additional passive keyless entry with push-start ignition. A new gear shifter design is only to be found on the Standard MT and Premium CVT variants with a frameless rear view mirror exclusive to the Premium variant. Lastly there is two types of instrument clusters. One for the Standard with a standard LCD and one for the Executive and Premium variants with full colour and more functionality.

The 2022 Persona shows off the new arrangements of both center cluster and center console. The center vents are relocated horizontally below the floating upgraded audio system. There are also redesigned semi-digital air-conditioner controls, X70-styled gear knob, six USB ports and new Proton logo emblem at steering. The center console is also redesigned with additional console armrest and console box to upgrade its practicality usage. Seat upholstery for both Standard and Executive variants is fabric type, whereas light brown leatherette type is reserved exclusively for Premium variant.

== Safety ==
ASEAN NCAP test results Proton Persona/Iriz (2020)
| Test | Points |
|---|---|
| Overall: | 5 /5 stars |
| Adult occupant: | 44.88 |
| Child occupant: | 21.90 |
| Safety assist: | 17.36 |

=== Active ===
Safety features (Note: Legend Blue : Standard across all trim levels. Green : Available on selected trim level(s) only, full package. Yellow : Available on selected trim level(s) only, but is not the full package. Red : Not available on selected trim level(s), or is the no-frills package.)
| Variant | Standard | Executive | | Premium |
|---|---|---|---|---|
| Market | (Malaysia) | (Malaysia) | (Brunei) | (Malaysia) |
| Vehicle Dynamic Control (Note: Vehicle Dynamic Control consists of the following active safety features; ABS - Anti-lock braking system EBD - Electronic brakeforce distribution BA - Emergency brake assist HHA - Hill-hold assist ESS - Emergency stop signal TCS - Traction control system ESC - Electronic Stability Control) (ABS, EBD, BA, HHA, ESS, TCS, ESC) | ✔ | | | |
| Hot press forming (HPF) | ✔ (8 components) | | | |
| Airbags | 2 (front) | | | 6 (front, side, curtain) |

The new BH Persona is the latest model in Proton's lineage to emphasise high safety standards. Proton's Vehicle Dynamic Control (VDC) program comes standard in all new Personas. VDC is an active safety net which includes an anti-lock braking system (ABS) with electronic brakeforce distribution (EBD) and brake assist (BA), hill-hold assist (HHA), emergency stop signal (ESS), traction control (TCS) and electronic stability control (ESC).

The sole purpose of the VDC program is to prevent or minimise the risks of a potential accident. Up to ten computer systems monitor all four wheels in addition to the driver's steering, throttle and braking input, in real time. Should the VDC system detect a loss of traction, the ESC and TCS components automatically apply braking pressure and reduce engine speed to prevent oversteer or understeer, ensuring that the driver remains in control. Should the driver apply the brakes in an emergency, the ABS component prevents the wheels from locking up, while EBD assigns appropriate brake force to each wheel and BA increases braking pressure to bring the car to a safe and complete stop. Under hard braking, ESS is also activated to warn other motorists. The HHA component prevents the car from rolling backwards whilst on a hill, should the brake pedal be released. The new Persona is the second Proton model to receive the VDC program as standard, after the Iriz. The BH Persona is also the first Proton to get front parking sensors as standard. The two front sensors, located just below the headlamps, complement the twin sensors on the rear bumper.

The brakes in the BH Persona consist of ventilated discs at the front and drums at the back. Although the old CM Persona had disc brakes both front and rear, the brake setup in the new Persona is more competent. At a speed of 100 km/h, it would take 41.4 metres to reach a complete stop, compared to 44.6 metres in the old Persona, an improvement of approximately 7%. The Standard and Executive BH Persona variants get 185/55R15 Silverstone Kruizer tyres, while the Premium model is fitted with 185/55R15 Goodyear Assurance tyres. The new Persona has a kerb weight between 1,155 kg and 1,210 kg depending on the variant, which represents an increase of between 20 and 30 kg over the Iriz.

The suspension setup in the BH Persona, like the Iriz, consists of MacPherson struts with stabiliser bars at the front and torsion beam axles at the rear. In comparison, the CM Persona received MacPherson struts with stabiliser bars up front and more sophisticated multi-links at the back. Additionally, the BH has electric power steering (EPS) as opposed to hydraulic power steering in the CM. The EPS system is easier to steer at low speeds and helps improve fuel efficiency, but it comes at the expense of more engaging steering feedback.

=== Passive ===
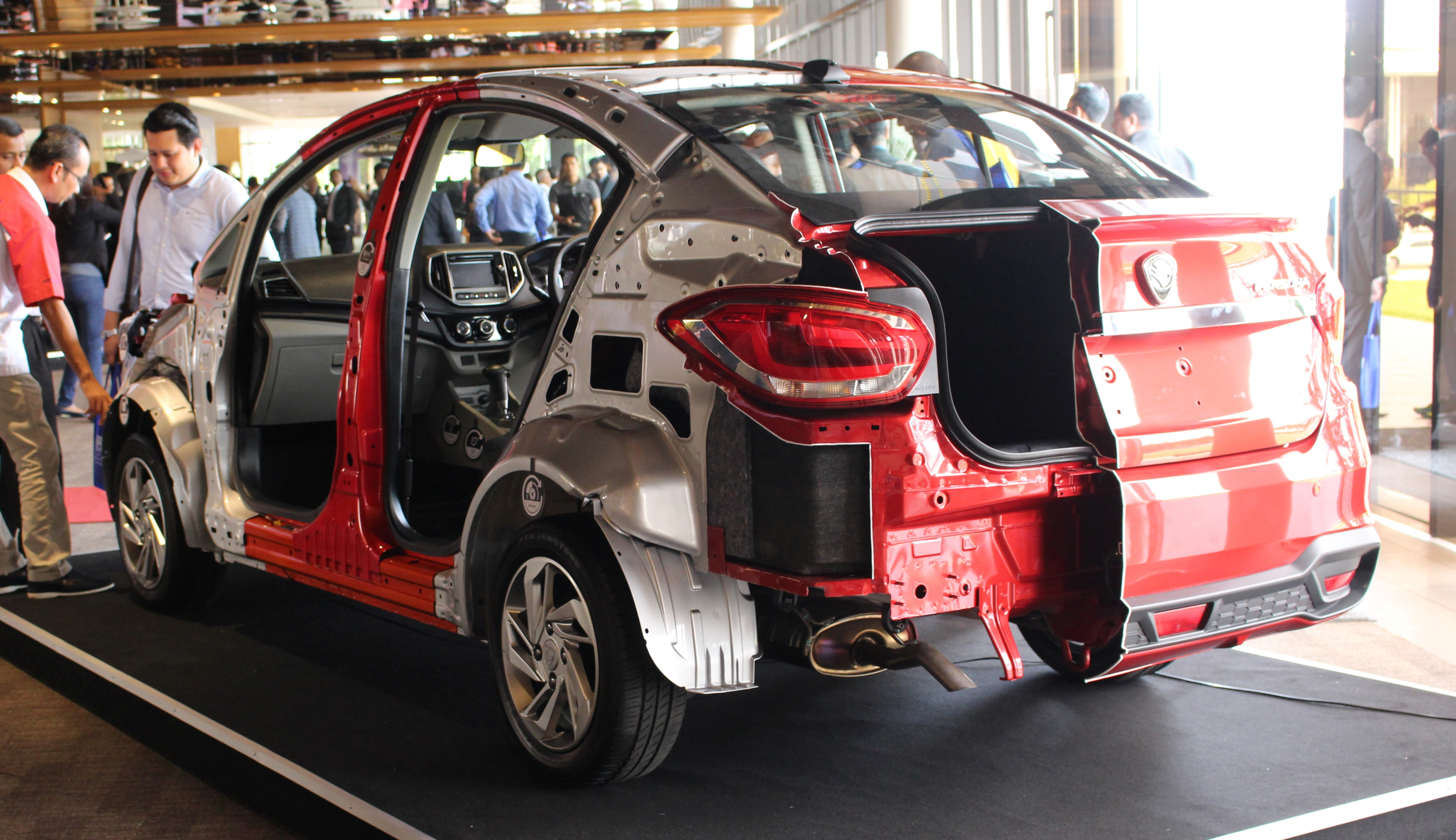
There are eight HPF components in the BH Persona.

The new Persona features Proton's hot press forming (HPF) technology. First offered in the 2012 Prevé, the new HPF manufacturing process has since found its way into the Suprima S, Iriz and BH Persona. Like the Iriz, eight HPF components have been incorporated into key points of the Persona's Reinforced Safety Structure (RESS). The main purpose of the HPF components is to reinforce and protect the passenger compartment in the event of a collision. HPF manufacturing begins with the super-heating of high strength carbon steel to 900 degrees Celsius, which is then rapidly cooled to 4 degrees Celsius and subsequently stamped into a preset mould. This quenching process makes the HPF steel five times stronger than conventional cold rolled steel. The HPF components are also lighter and more rigid, helping improve performance, handling and fuel efficiency on top of safety.

In addition to the HPF reinforced body structure, other passive safety features in the new BH Persona include SRS airbags, two ISOFIX child seat mounts with top tethers, head restraints and five three-point seat belts, with pre-tensioning for front passengers. The Standard and Executive models have seat belt reminders for both front seats, while the Premium has reminders for all five seats. In the event of a crash, the Persona's body control module (BCM) automatically unlocks all doors to facilitate an emergency exit. The Standard and Executive variants are fitted with twin front airbags, while the Premium model includes additional twin side airbags up front, and twin full-length curtain airbags for a total of six respectively. The airbag modules are supplied by Autoliv-Hirotako (AHSB). 2021 Persona adds two side airbags for both Standard and Executive variants, and also one USB port behind rearview mirror for additional safety devices, for all variants.

The various safety features in the BH Persona helped it score the full five-star rating in its ASEAN NCAP assessment. The Persona received 14.07 points out of the maximum 16 for Adult Occupant Protection, and an 82% compliance rating in the Child Occupant Protection category, exactly the same as the Iriz. This is due to the fact that ASEAN NCAP did not actually crash test the BH Persona, as they have deemed that it is a variant of the Iriz. ASEAN NCAP has nonetheless verified the crash test data from Proton's development test at the MIROS PC3 lab and compared it against their Iriz crash test data. Additionally, the BH Persona has also been crash tested at an Applus+ IDIADA facility in February 2016.

== Powertrain ==
Manufacturer's claims
| Engine | 1.6 L VVT S4PH |
|---|---|
| Format | I4 16V DOHC NA VVT |
| Total displacement (cc) | 1,597 |
| Bore x Stroke (mm x mm) | 76.0 x 88.0 |
| Maximum Output [hp(kW)/rpm] | 107 (80) / 5,750 |
| Maximum Torque (Nm/rpm) | 150 / 4,000 |
| Maximum Speed (km/h) | 170 km/h |
| Acceleration 0–100 km/h (sec) | 10.9 (CVT) |
| Fuel tank capacity (litres) | 40 |

The new BH Persona is powered by Proton's 1.6-litre VVT S4PH engine, a naturally aspirated, four-cylinder, 16-valve DOHC petrol unit with variable valve timing. The 1.6-litre VVT, the sole option in the BH Persona, is capable of 107 hp at 5,750 rpm and 150 Nm at 4,000 rpm. Although the engine appears mechanically identical to its previous application in the Iriz, Proton has made further refinements for reduced noise, vibration and harshness (NVH) and improved fuel efficiency. The 1.6 L engine in the new Persona is fitted with a three-mount configuration, as opposed to four in the Iriz. Proton claims that the improved mounting configuration has reduced transmissions of engine vibrations into the cabin, and is six decibels quieter when compared to the equivalent Iriz model. Additionally, the new exhaust system in the BH Persona has remedied exhaust drone at lower revs, and the ECU has been recalibrated for a more linear throttle response. The new VVT engine also has a longer 10,000 km service interval.

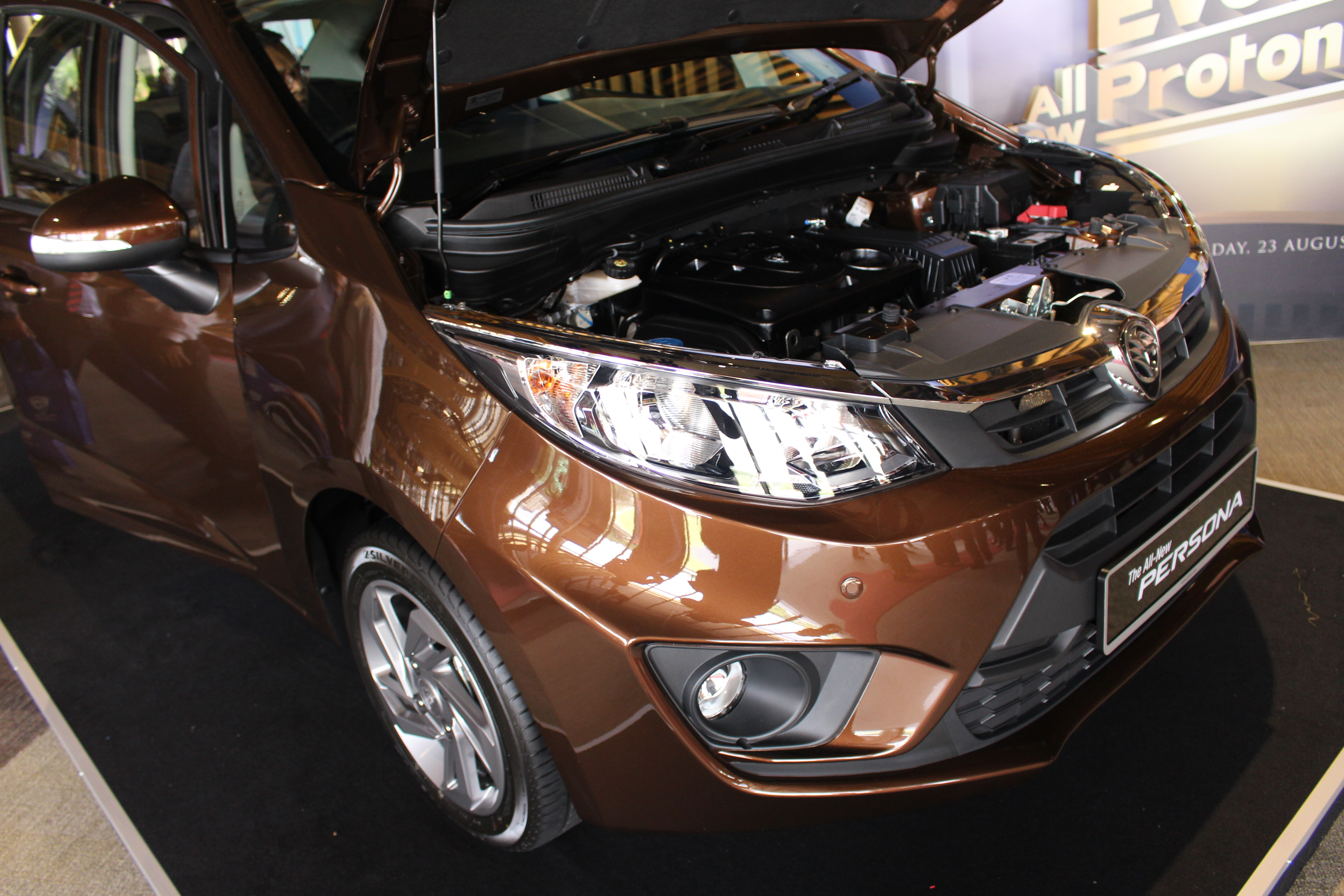
All BH Persona variants are powered by Proton's 107 hp 1.6-litre VVT S4PH engine.

Like the Iriz, the new Persona is paired to either a Getrag 5-speed manual or a Punch Powertrain VT2+ CVT. However, Proton has refined the Punch CVT for a smoother drive, and in its latest iteration is claimed to be far more responsive and has narrowed the gap to its competitors. As a result of the various refinements made to the engine and transmission combination in the BH Persona, Proton claims that fuel efficiency has improved by 13% to 5.6L/100 km with the manual, and by 10% to 6.1L/100 km with the CVT, both at a constant speed of 90 km/h. The BH Persona is the first Proton model to utilise the company's new ECO Drive Assist feature. The system assesses the driver's throttle input, and a green indicator on the instrument cluster will light up when the car is being driven in an economical manner. The engine in the new BH is also VVT-enabled, while its old CM counterpart was not. The BH has a 40-litre fuel tank, 10-litres smaller than the CM.

The new BH Persona has 3 hp less than the outgoing CM series, but the full 107 hp is accessible earlier at 5,750 rpm, compared to 6,500 rpm in the old CM. Additionally, the BH has 2 Nm more torque over the CM, while access speed is unchanged at 4,000 rpm. Acceleration has also improved, with the CVT-equipped BH taking 10.9 seconds to reach 100 km/h from a standstill, which is 3 seconds faster than the old 4-speed automatic CM. Proton has decided not to offer the Iriz's 1.3 L VVT engine in the new Persona, as they intend to prevent overlapping and cross cannibalisation by fitting it in the upcoming 2016 Proton Saga instead.

== Awards and accolades ==
- Best Compact Car - Carsifu Editor's Choice Awards 2016
- Most Improved Model in Fuel Efficiency - Malaysia Car of the Year 2016
- Compact Sedan (Bronze Winner) - Carlist.my People's Choice Awards 2018

== See also ==
- Proton Iriz, the 5-door hatchback complement
