= Proton Iriz =

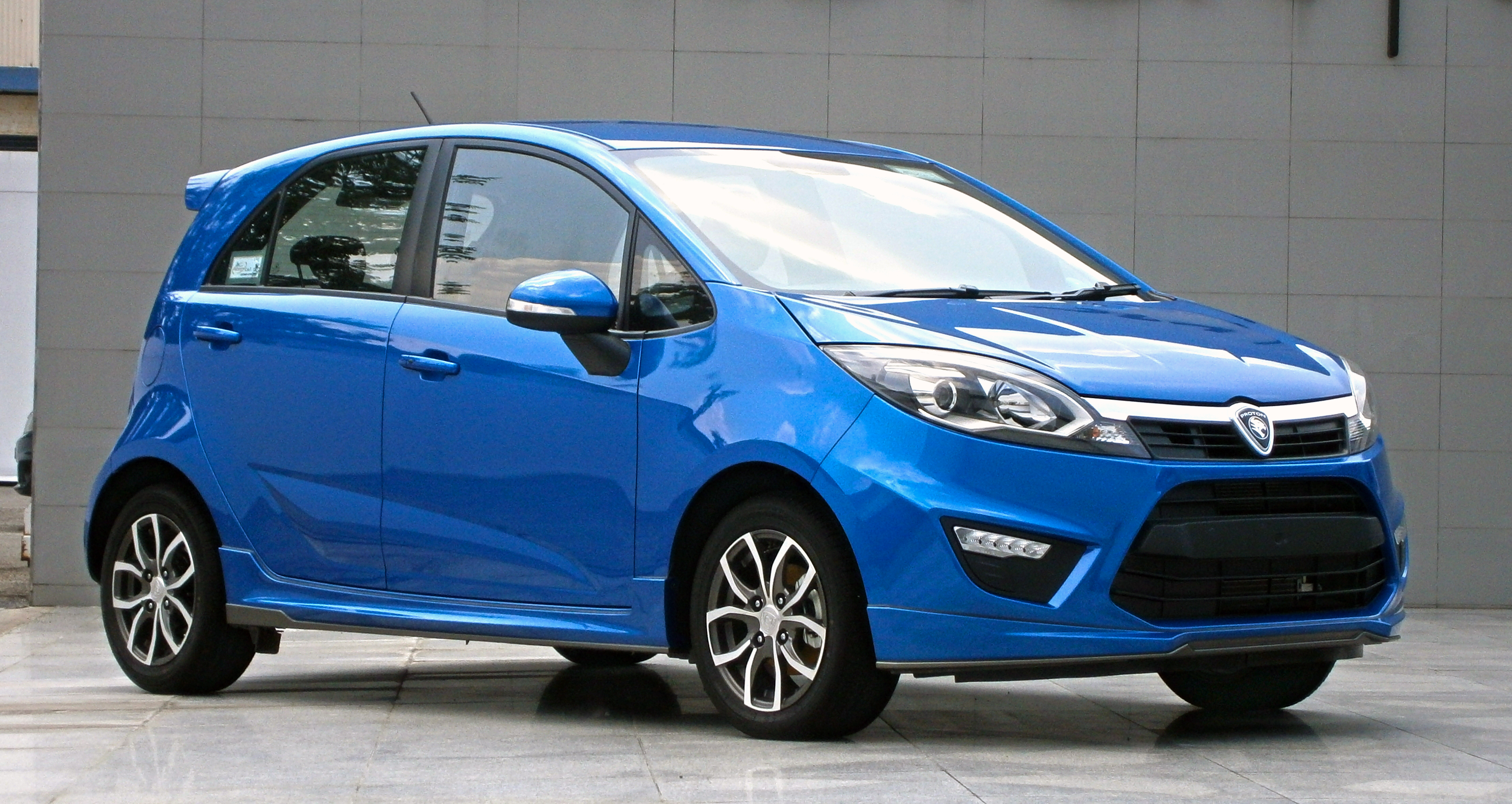

Overview
- Manufacturer: Proton
- Model code: P2-30A
- Production: September 2014 – September 2025; 97,576 built
- Assembly: Malaysia: Proton City, Perak (PTMSB)
- Designer: Azlan Othman

Body and chassis
- Class: Supermini (B)
- Body style: 5-door hatchback
- Layout: Front-engine, front-wheel drive
- Related: Proton Persona (BH)

Powertrain
- Engine: 1.3 L VVT S4PE DOHC I4; 1.6 L VVT S4PH DOHC I4
- Transmission: 5-speed manual (2014–2021); CVT (2014-2025)

Dimensions
- Wheelbase: 2,555 mm (100.6 in)
- Length: 3,945–3,965 mm (155.3–156.1 in)
- Width: 1,722–1,740 mm (67.8–68.5 in)
- Height: 1,554–1,574 mm (61.2–62.0 in)
- Kerb weight: 1,165–1,185 kg (2,568.4–2,612.5 lb)

Chronology
- Predecessor: Proton Savvy
- Successor: Proton e.MAS 5

The Proton Iriz is a supermini (B-segment) produced by Malaysian automobile manufacturer Proton from 2014 to 2025. It was unveiled on 25 September 2014 at Proton City by Malaysia’s fourth and seventh prime minister, Mahathir Mohamad. The Iriz platform is also used by its sedan equivalent, the Persona (BH) which was introduced in 2016.

The name Iriz is inspired by the anatomical term iris, responsible for sight and vision.

== Pre-launch ==
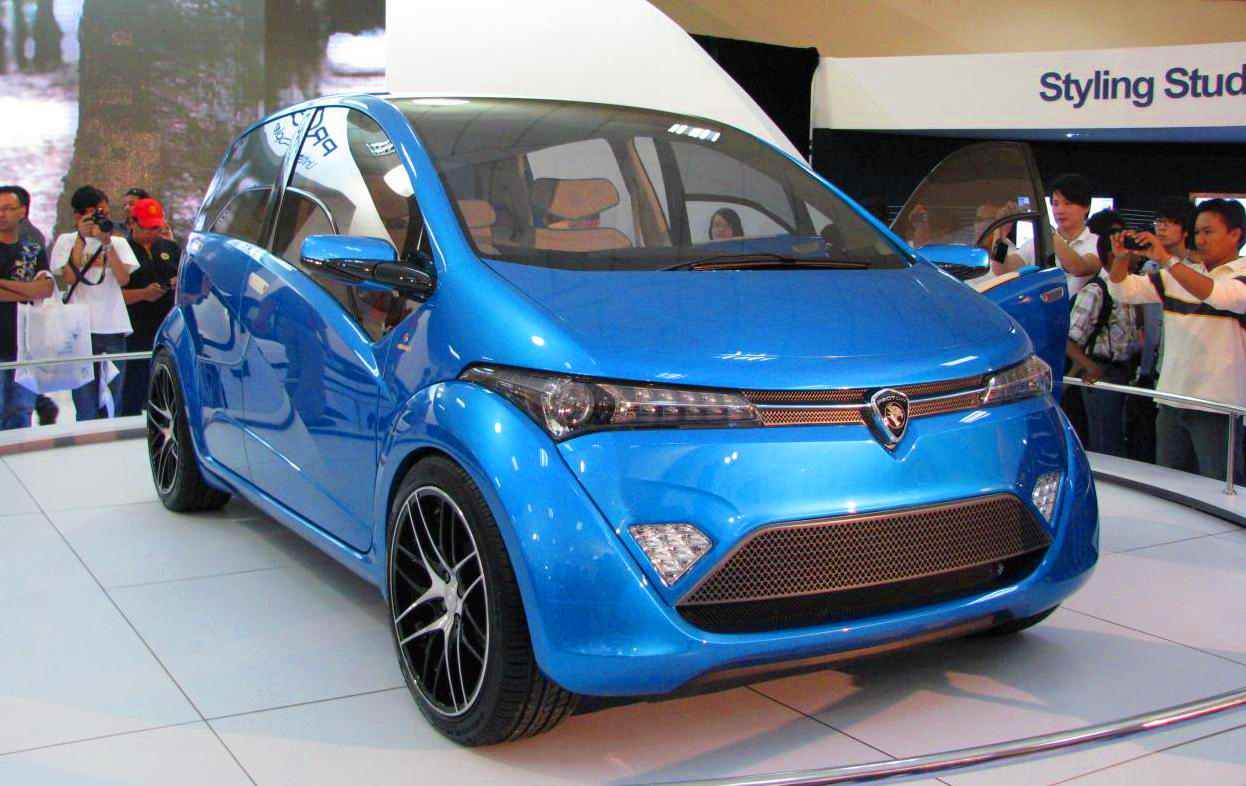
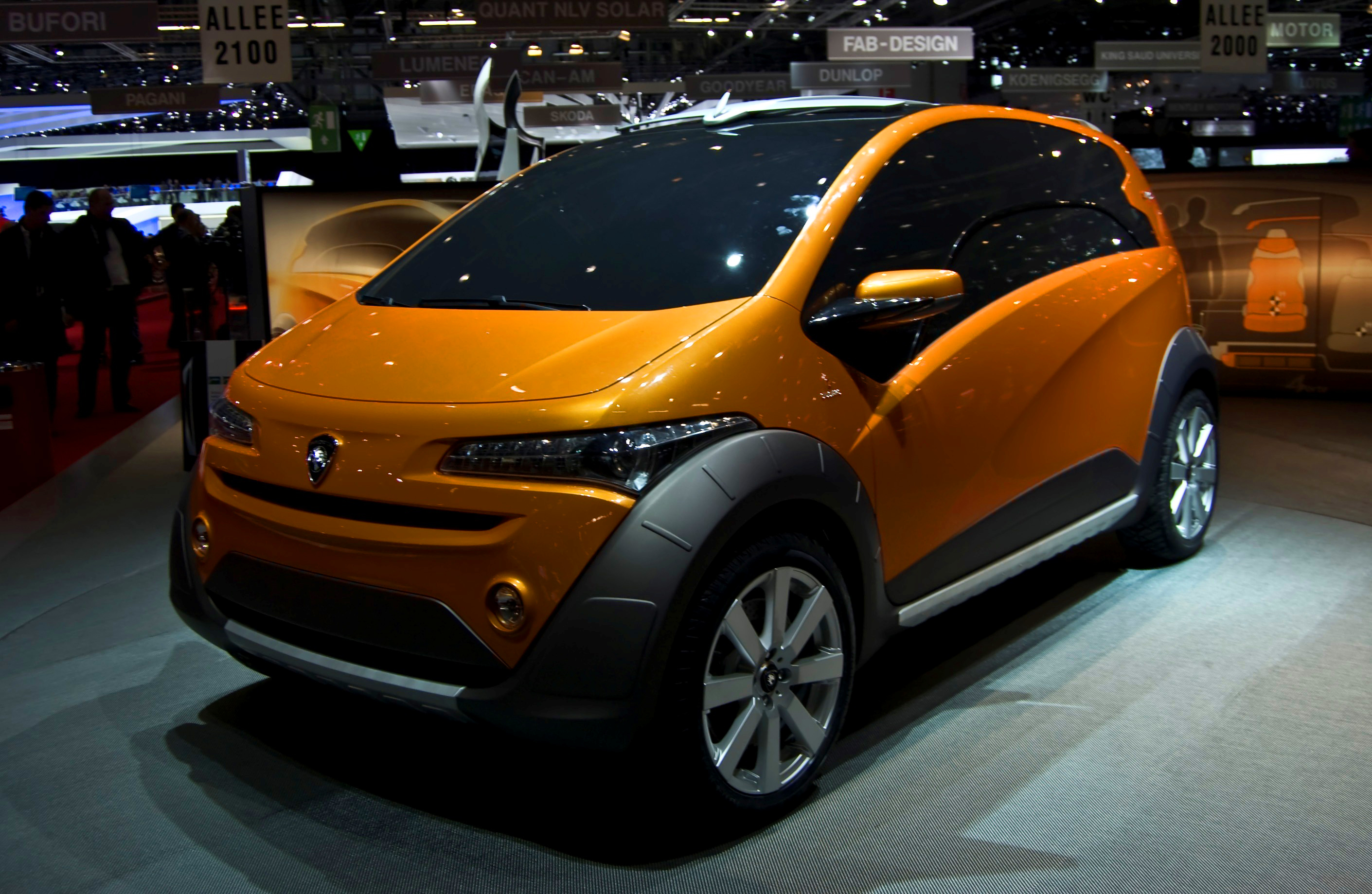
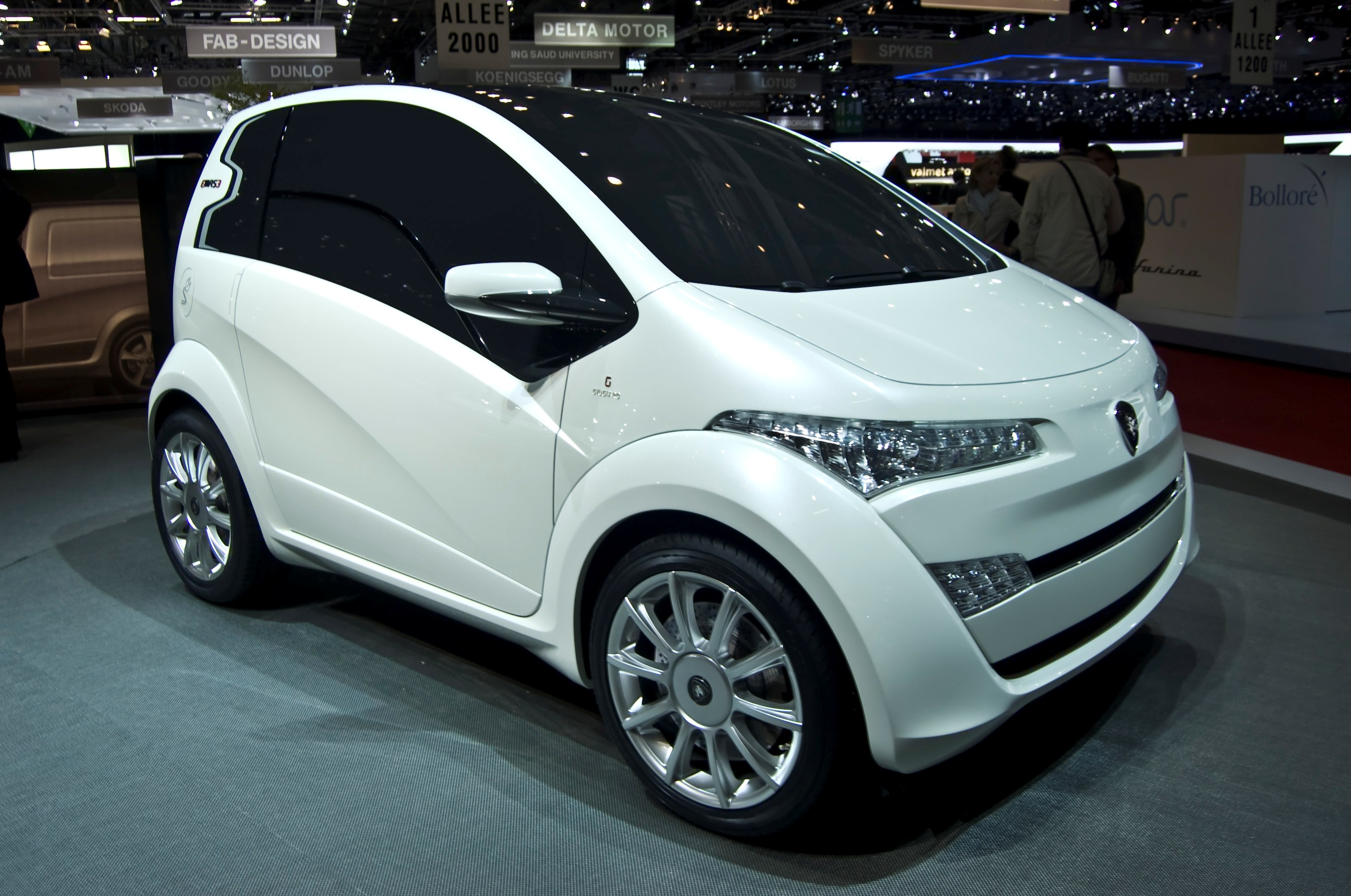
The three Proton EMAS concepts. From top to bottom; EMAS, EMAS Country, EMAS3.

Plans for a Proton Savvy replacement were first revealed with the introduction of the Proton EMAS concept cars at the 2010 Geneva Motor Show. The EMAS concept cars were designed by Italdesign Giugiaro and are related to the Lotus Ethos, a similar concept car from Proton's British subsidiary. Proton and Lotus Cars wished to jointly develop the global small car, where the Proton versions will be aimed at the budget conscious and the Lotus models on the hot hatch market. However, since the announcement, Proton has undergone a change in ownership and further details on the joint venture have not been publicized. Proton also considered a tie-up with Mitsubishi Motors in 2011 regarding the development of Proton's upcoming small car.

The first official Iriz details from Proton came in the form of a naming contest called Nama Siapa Hebat? ("Whose Name Is Greatest?" in English). The contest invited all citizens of Malaysia to help name the upcoming car. The name had to be in Malay and was to consist of no more than six letters. The contest ran for one month from 25 June till 25 July 2013. The grand prize winner was to receive a Premium variant of the car upon its launch in 2014. Proton began processing contest entries by August 2013, taking the necessary precautions to avoid trademark conflicts and language ambiguity in global markets.

On 22 August 2014, Proton Chief Technical Officer (CTO) Abdul Rashid Musa held a media briefing on the upcoming P2-30A. The briefing detailed that two new engines will be offered, a 1.3-litre and a 1.6-litre, both of which incorporate variable valve timing (VVT) technology for more power and improved fuel-efficiency. The new Proton will be able to travel from Bukit Kayu Hitam in the very north of the Malay Peninsula to Johor Bahru in the very south, a journey of around 800 kilometres (500 miles) in just a single tank of petrol. It is however worth noting that Proton's older CamPro CPS and more recent CamPro CFE also offer VVT technology. The new 1.3 and 1.6 engines will also offer reduced emissions, in line with Proton's intentions to sell the P2-30A in markets which impose taxes based on emissions such as the European Union. The car will also be offered with an electric power steering (EPS) system for ease of steering and improved fuel efficiency, along with a choice of either manual or automatic transmission. Proton claims that the new engines will be 10% more fuel-efficient in comparison to the older CamPro engines. Additionally, Azlan Othman, Proton's Head of Styling mentioned that the new GSC will maintain Proton's design philosophy of 'timeless beauty'. In his words, “We don't need to be trendy, and then forgotten. We need to be timeless, to have designs that last.” In terms of safety, the Proton GSC will launch as the safest Proton car yet, safer even than the bigger and more expensive Prevé and Suprima S. It will be equipped with no less than 10 computerised electronic systems, 6 airbags and Proton's Reinforced Safety Structure (RESS) with Hot Press Forming (HPF) technology. The P2-30A will be offered in at least 3 variants, namely 'Standard', 'Executive' and 'Premium', in a range of seven different colours. Proton also iterated that the GSC is not a direct successor or replacement to the Savvy as initially believed by the media, but is instead a separate new segment for Proton. The GSC will be a larger B-segment 5-door hatchback, unlike the much smaller A-segment Savvy.

The Iriz originally scheduled for an April, May or June 2014 launch in Malaysia. However, the launch has since been delayed to 25 September. since it has to go a 100,000 km drive cycle on road testing. The Iriz will be the first all-new model to be developed under Proton's new owner, DRB-HICOM. Dr. Mahathir Mohamad, recently appointed chairman of Proton has stated that in a bid to move upmarket, the upcoming Iriz will cost more than expected, but nonetheless still cheaper than its rivals from the same segment. The P2-30A will incorporate better quality components and a long list of standard features never before seen in a small Proton, more even than its bigger siblings, the 2012 Prevé and 2013 Suprima S. Dr. Mahathir has also promised to tackle the issue of quality control among Proton's vendors, with the aim of incorporating the highest quality components from only the best vendors in an effort to improve public confidence in Proton's below-average build quality standards. The Proton Iriz took 4 years to develop at a cost of between RM560 million. The company has also promised a 5-Star ANCAP safety rating for the P2-30A.

Introduction of the Iriz in Mauritius took place in October 2016, while Indonesian introduction occurred in February 2017.

== Post-launch ==
In 2017, Proton Iriz was updated which included various improvements from its sibling, the Persona. The 1.6L Executive variant was released to the public, and the manual transmission was only available on the base Standard model.

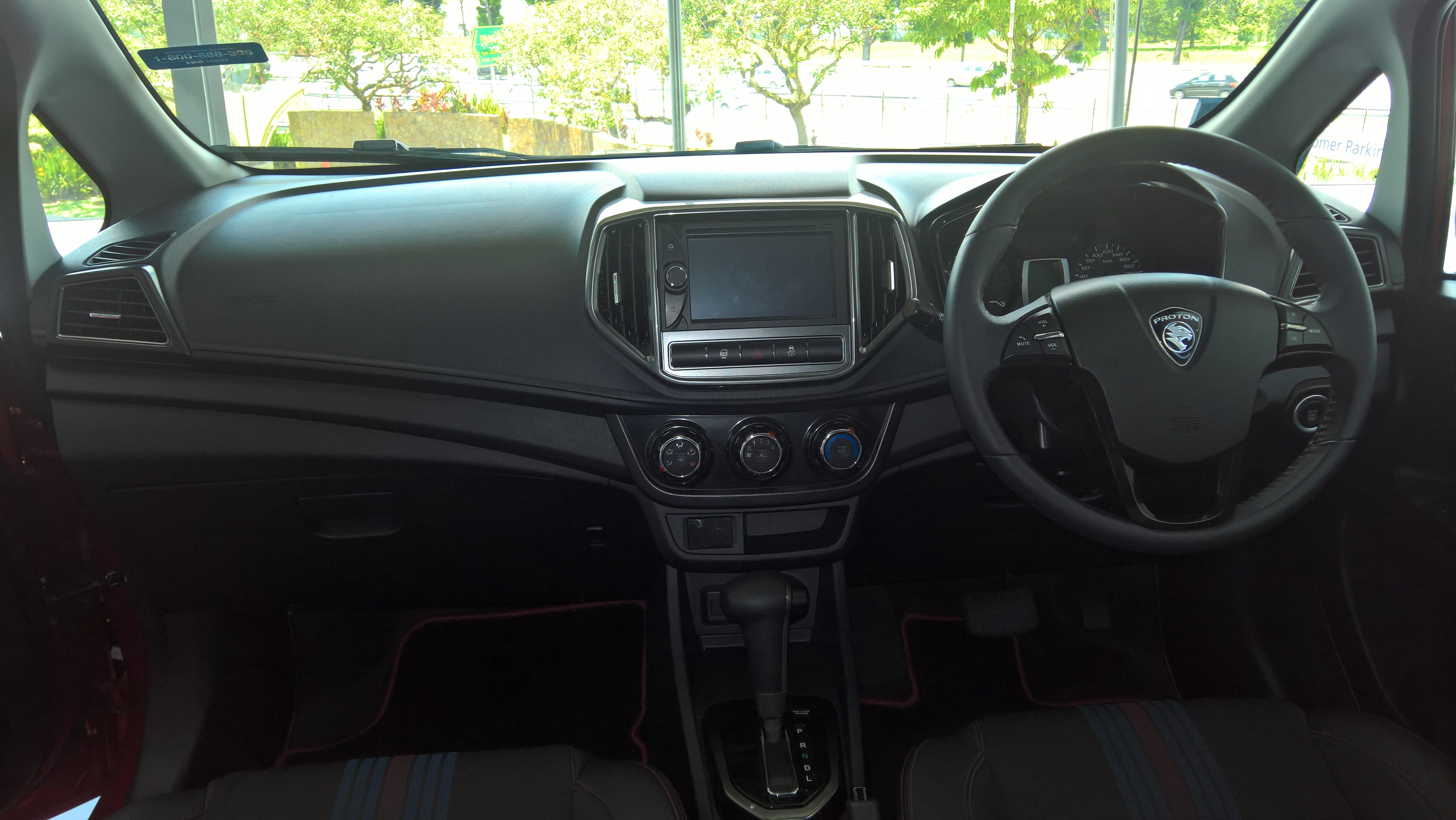
Interior of a Proton Iriz pre-facelift

In February 2019, Proton released a press release attached with official images showcasing the Proton Iriz facelift. On 28 February 2019, more specifications were revealed on the facelift Iriz during an official media preview. It was revealed that the 1.6L Executive CVT model would make a comeback while the manual transmission will only continue to be offered on the 1.3L Standard model. Automatic headlights becomes standard. On April 23, 2019, Proton officially launched the first facelifted Iriz at the Kuala Lumpur Convention Centre.

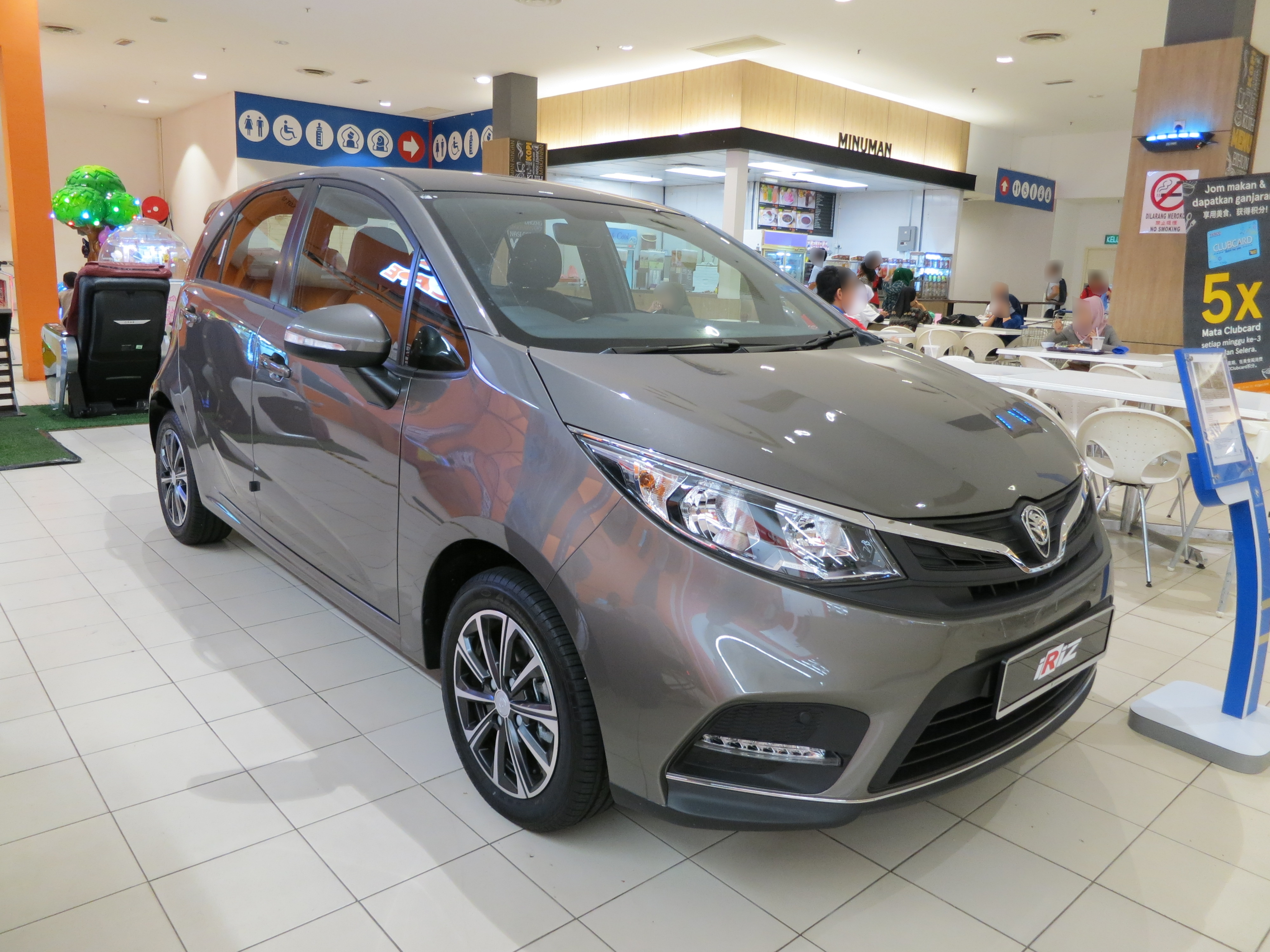
2019 Proton Iriz Premium

On February 18, 2021, Proton released the Proton Iriz R3 limited edition.

On August 5, 2021, Proton launched the second facelifted Iriz, with three new variants available. The 1.3L Standard, 1.6L Executive and 1.6L Active. Both 1.3L Standard MT and 1.6L Premium variants have been dropped. New colours include Citric Orange and Passion Red, the latter replacing the previous Ruby Red.

The 2019 Iriz sees a new seat pattern for the Standard and Executive variants, and the air conditioning controls markings are now white only. The Standard variants feature a double din like-sized head unit with capacitive buttons that are not visible without illumination. This is a similar head unit to that found in Saga, Persona and Exora Standard. The Executive and Premium variant meanwhile has a head unit that runs GKUI with the Premium variant getting Proton's Hi Proton voice recognition feature. A new gear shifter design is only to be found on the Standard MT and Premium CVT variants with a frameless rearview mirror exclusive to the Premium variant. Lastly, there are two types of instrument clusters: one for the Standard with a standard LCD and one for the Executive and Premium variants with full colour and more functionality.

The 2019 Iriz key design changes include revised front fascia with Proton's new infinite weave design language with a chrome strip dubbed ethereal bow and Proton lettering on the rear as well as redesigned front and rear bumpers. For the Executive and Premium variant, in place of the front fog lamps are now LED DRLs. Two new wheel designs are present. A 14-inch single-tone one for 1.3 Standard variant and 15-inch dual-tone wheels for Executive and Premium variants.

On 5 August 2021, Proton launched its second facelift of the Proton Iriz which brought about more changes to its exterior and interior. Gaining an all-new face that's shared with the 2022 Proton Persona for the first time. This includes new bumpers with the top-spec Active variant gaining a rugged crossover look, aimed towards the younger crowd. New 16-inch alloys finish off the exterior, while the interior gains a new look and feel. The dashboard and centre console are new with red highlights found throughout.

The Proton Iriz production was discontinued in September 2025 to make a way new upcoming Proton e.MAS 5 electric hatchback successor to the Iriz that occupies the same segment.

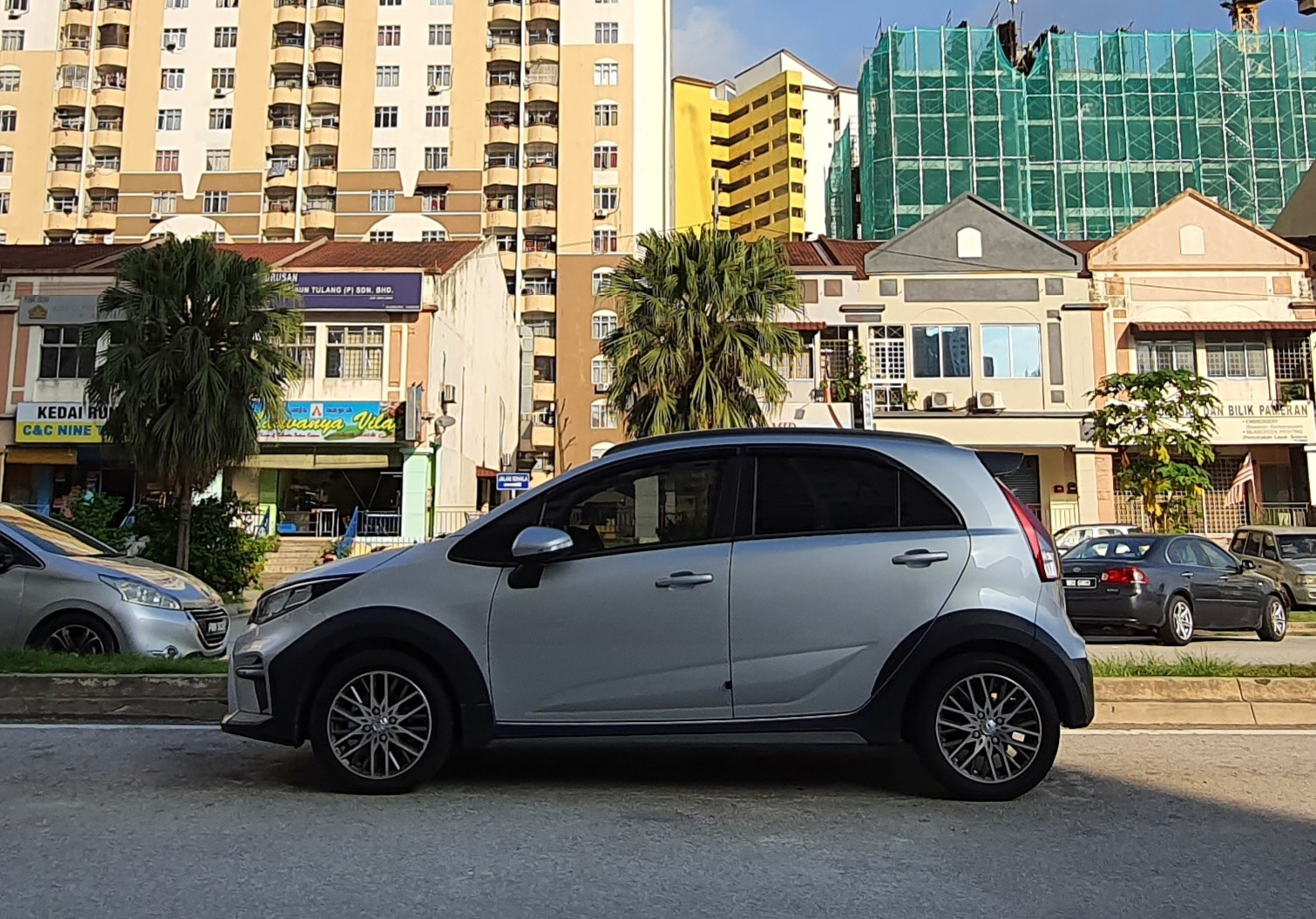
Side profile of the 2022 Proton Iriz (1.6 Active variant).

== Specification ==
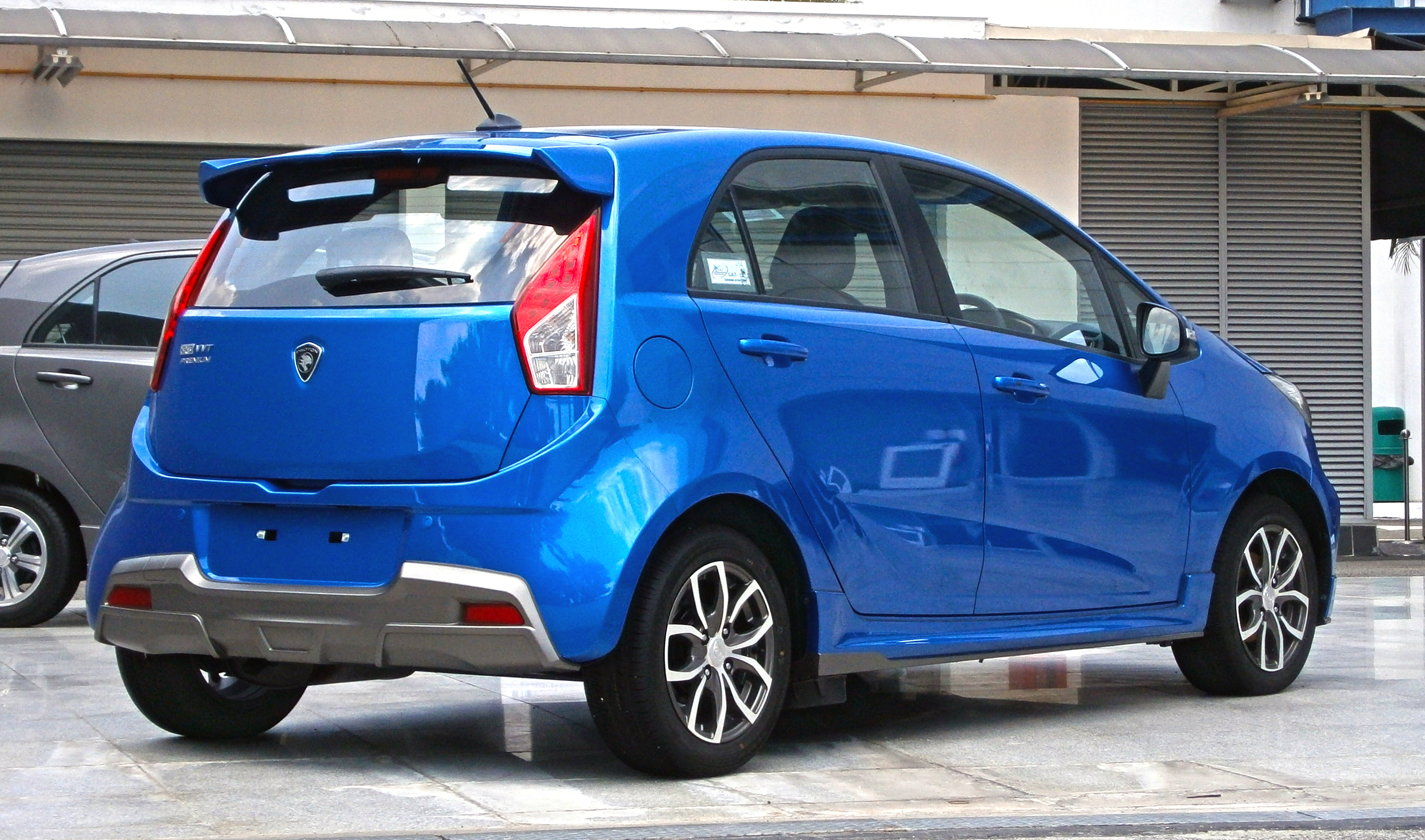
View of the back of the Proton Iriz

The Iriz measures 3,905mm (12 ft, 8in) in length versus the Myvi's 3,690mm (12 ft, 1in); it is also wider at 1,720mm (5 ft, 7in) (Myvi: 1,665mm (5 ft, 5.6in)), and is 5mm (0.2 in) higher than the Myvi (1,550mm (5 ft, 1in) for Iriz versus 1,545mm for Myvi). The Iriz has a longer wheelbase of 2,555mm (8 ft, 4.6in) versus the Myvi at 2,440mm. The 1.3 litre Iriz is rated at 70 kW (95 PS) at 5,750 rpm, and 120 Nm of torque at 4,000 rpm, while the Myvi 1.3 litre equivalent has lower power (67 kW at 6,000 rpm and 117 Nm torque at 4,400 rpm). Proton uses a 1.6 litre engine pulling 109PS at 5,750 rpm and 150 Nm (111 ft lbs) of torque, which is also higher than the Myvi 1.5 litre engine which pulls 104PS at 6,000 rpm and 136 Nm (100 ft lbs) of torque at 4,000 rpm.

The Proton Iriz is powered by either a 1.3-litre or 1.6-litre four-cylinder engine. Both units are capable of variable valve timing (VVT) and have new blocks, pistons and valves. The new VVT engines are also Euro 5 compliant, but were nonetheless detuned to Euro 4 standards for the domestic market. Proton had announced plans to license a turbo diesel engine from a foreign manufacturer, to better compete in European markets.

Manufacturer's claims
Engine	1.3L VVT	1.6L VVT
Format	I4 DOHC 16V	I4 DOHC 16V
Total displacement (cc)	1,332	1,597
Bore x stroke (mm x mm)	76 x 73.4	76 x 88
Maximum output [kW(ps)/rpm]	70(95) / 5,750	80(109) / 5,750
Maximum torque (Nm/rpm)	120 / 4,000	150 / 4,000
Maximum speed (km/h)	175 (peak force:185) (MT) / 170 (peak force:180) (CVT)	190 (peak force:215) (MT) / 185 (peak force:200) (CVT)
Acceleration 0–100 km/h (sec)	12.1 (MT) / 13.1 (CVT)	11.1 (MT) / 10.1 (CVT)
Fuel tank capacity (litres)	40	40

== Safety ==
ASEAN NCAP test results Proton Persona/Iriz (2020)
Test	Points
Overall:	5 /5 stars
Adult occupant:	44.88
Child occupant:	21.90
Safety assist:	17.36

Safety (Note: Legend Blue : Standard across all trim levels. Green : Available on selected trim level(s) only, full package. Yellow : Available on selected trim level(s) only, but is not the full package. Red : Not available on selected trim level(s), or is the no-frills package.)
Variant	Standard				Executive			Premium		
Market	(Malaysia)	(Mauritius)	(Brunei)	(Indonesia)	(Malaysia)	(Mauritius)	(Brunei)	(Malaysia)	(Mauritius)	(Brunei)
Vehicle Dynamic Control (Note: Vehicle Dynamic Control consists of ABS - Anti-lock braking system EBD - Electronic brakeforce distribution BA - Emergency brake assist HHA - Hill-hold assist ESS - Emergency stop signal TCS - Traction control system ESC - Electronic Stability Control) (ABS, EBD, BA, HHA, ESS, TCS, ESC)	✔									
Hot press forming (HPF)	✔ (8 components)									
Airbags	2 (front)							6 (front, side, curtain)		

All Iriz variants get Proton's VDC (Vehicle Dynamic Control) active safety net which consists of ESC, TCS, ABS, EBD, BA and HHA. Vehicle Dynamic Control aims to prevent or minimize the risks of a potential accident. It monitors the driver's steering and braking input, and if a loss of traction is detected, VDC automatically reduces engine speed and applies braking pressure, ensuring that the driver remains in control. As for safety, the Iriz was tested again in 2020 and scored a maximum of five stars in the ASEAN NCAP crash test. This is done under the newly revised and restructured protocols of the 2020 ASEAN NCAP guidelines which has a different testing regime over its previous system.

The critical sections of the Iriz's body structure incorporates Proton's RESS hot press forming (HPF) technology, which is five times stronger than normal cold rolled galvanized steel. Proton is one of the earliest adopters of HPF technology, and the company's efforts helped rank Malaysia as the sixth country in the world to adopt HPF manufacturing. In the event of an accident, the Iriz's body control module automatically unlocks all doors to facilitate an emergency exit. The Head Restraint reduces the risk of whiplash by preventing the driver's head from tilting backwards during a rear-end collision. All five seats come with 3-point seat belts, and ISOFIX anchors are also fitted in anticipation of the Iriz's launch in more safety-conscious markets.

== Sales ==
Year	Malaysia (Note: Figures based on registration)
2014	2,991
2015	27,714
2016	11,757
2017	5,799
2018	3,359
2019	6,673
2020	7,568
2021	6,700
2022	5,639
2023	7,600

== Reception ==
Proton Iriz sales & production between 2014 and Q2 2016
Country	Total	Q2 2016	Q1 2016	2015	2014
Malaysia		3,555	4,377	17,048	
Total produced	43,129	4,825	3,239	26,793	8,272
Notes: Q1 2016 applies for the months of January, February & March 2016 respectively. Q2 2016 applies for the months of April, May & June 2016 respectively. Total applies for units sold in the specified country between sales inception and June 2016 respectively. Total global sales applies for combined units sold in all active markets. Total produced applies for all units produced between September 2014 and June 2016 respectively.

== Awards and accolades ==
- Compact Hatchback - NST-Maybank Car of the Year Awards 2014
- People's Choice - NST-Maybank Car of the Year Awards 2014
- Malaysia Good Design Mark Award 2014
- Best Industrial Design 2015 - the Intellectual Property Corporation
- Most Affordable 5-Star Asean NCAP Car in Malaysia - Asean NCAP Grand Prix Award 2016
- Budget Car of the Year - 2016 ASEAN Car of the Year
- Best Compact Hatch - Carsifu Editor's Choice Award 2017
- Best NVH (Noise, Vibration and Harshness) - Malaysia Car of the Year (COTY) Awards 2017
- Best 3 Compact Hatch of Malaysia‍‍‍ - Aurizn Awards 2018 'Cars of Malaysia'
- Best 3 City Cars - 2019 'Cars of Malaysia'
- Best Compact Hatch (below RM70K) - CarSifu Editors' Choice Awards 2019
