= Active safety =

The term active safety (or primary safety) is used in two distinct ways.

The first, mainly in the United States, refers to automobile safety systems that help avoid accidents, such as good steering and brakes. In this context, passive safety refers to features that help reduce the effects of an accident, such as seat belts, airbags and strong body structures. This use is essentially interchangeable with the terms primary and secondary safety that tend to be used worldwide in standard UK English. The correct ISO term is "primary safety" (ISO 12353-1).

However, active safety is increasingly being used to describe systems that use an understanding of the state of the vehicle to both avoid and minimise the effects of a crash. These include braking systems, like brake assist, traction control systems and electronic stability control systems, that interpret signals from various sensors to help the driver control the vehicle. Additionally, forward-looking, sensor-based systems such as advanced driver-assistance systems including adaptive cruise control and collision warning/avoidance/mitigation systems are also considered as active safety systems under this definition.

These forward-looking technologies are expected to play an increasing role in collision avoidance and mitigation in the future. Most major component suppliers, such as Aptiv, TRW and Bosch, are developing such systems. However, as they become more sophisticated, questions will need to be addressed regarding driver autonomy and at what point these systems should intervene if they believe a crash is likely.

In engineering, active safety systems are systems activated in response to a safety problem or abnormal event. Such systems may be activated by a human operator, automatically by a computer driven system, or even mechanically. In nuclear engineering, active safety contrasts to passive safety in that it relies on operator or computer automated intervention, whereas passive safety systems rely on the laws of nature to make the reactor respond to dangerous events in a favourable manner.

== Examples ==
- The computer operated control rods in a nuclear power station provide an active safety system, whereas a fuel that produces less heat at abnormally high temperatures constitutes a passive safety feature
- Collision avoidance systems in a modern car
- Many buildings have interconnected fire alarms that can be triggered manually by pushing a button or breaking a glass plate attached to sensors

== Automotive sector ==
In the automotive sector the term active safety (or primary safety) refers to safety systems that are active prior to an accident. This has traditionally referred to non-complex systems such as good visibility from the vehicle and low interior noise levels. Nowadays, however, this area contains highly advanced systems such as anti-lock braking system, electronic stability control and collision warning/avoidance through automatic braking. This compares with passive safety (or secondary safety), which are active during an accident. To this category belong seat belts, deformation zones and air-bags, etc.

Advancement in passive safety systems has progressed very far over the years, and the automotive industry has shifted its attention to active safety where there are still a lot of new unexplored areas. Research today focuses primarily on collision avoidance (with other vehicles, pedestrians and wild animals) and vehicle platooning.

=== Examples of active safety ===
- Good visibility from driver's seat,
- Low noise level in interior,
- Legibility of instrumentation and warning symbols,
- Early warning of severe braking ahead,
- Head up displays,
- Good chassis balance and handling,
- Good grip,
- Anti-lock braking system,
- Electronic Stability Control,
- Chassis assist,
- Intelligent speed adaptation,
- Brake assist,
- Traction control,
- Collision warning/avoidance,
- Adaptive or autonomous cruise control system.
- Electronic brakeforce distribution
- front & rear wiper

=== Examples of passive safety ===
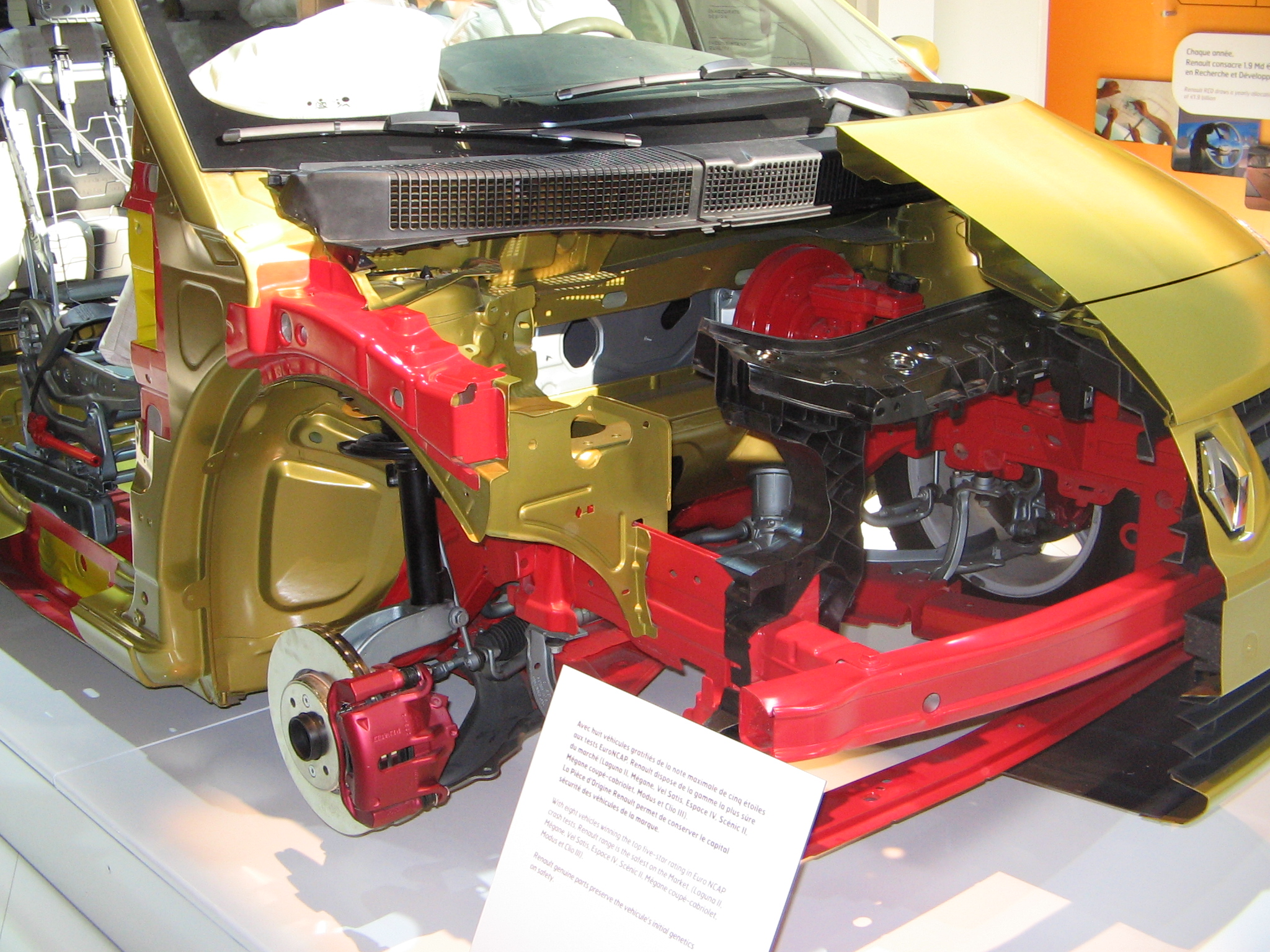
Front structure of a Renault Scénic showing crumple zones.

- Passenger safety cell,
- Crumple zones,
- Seat belts,
- Loadspace barrier-nets,
- Air bags,
- Laminated glass,
- Correctly positioned fuel tanks,
- Fuel pump kill switches

== See also ==
- Passively safe
- Intelligent Speed Adaptation (ISA)
- Electronic Stability Control
