= Proton CamPro engine =

Proton CamPro
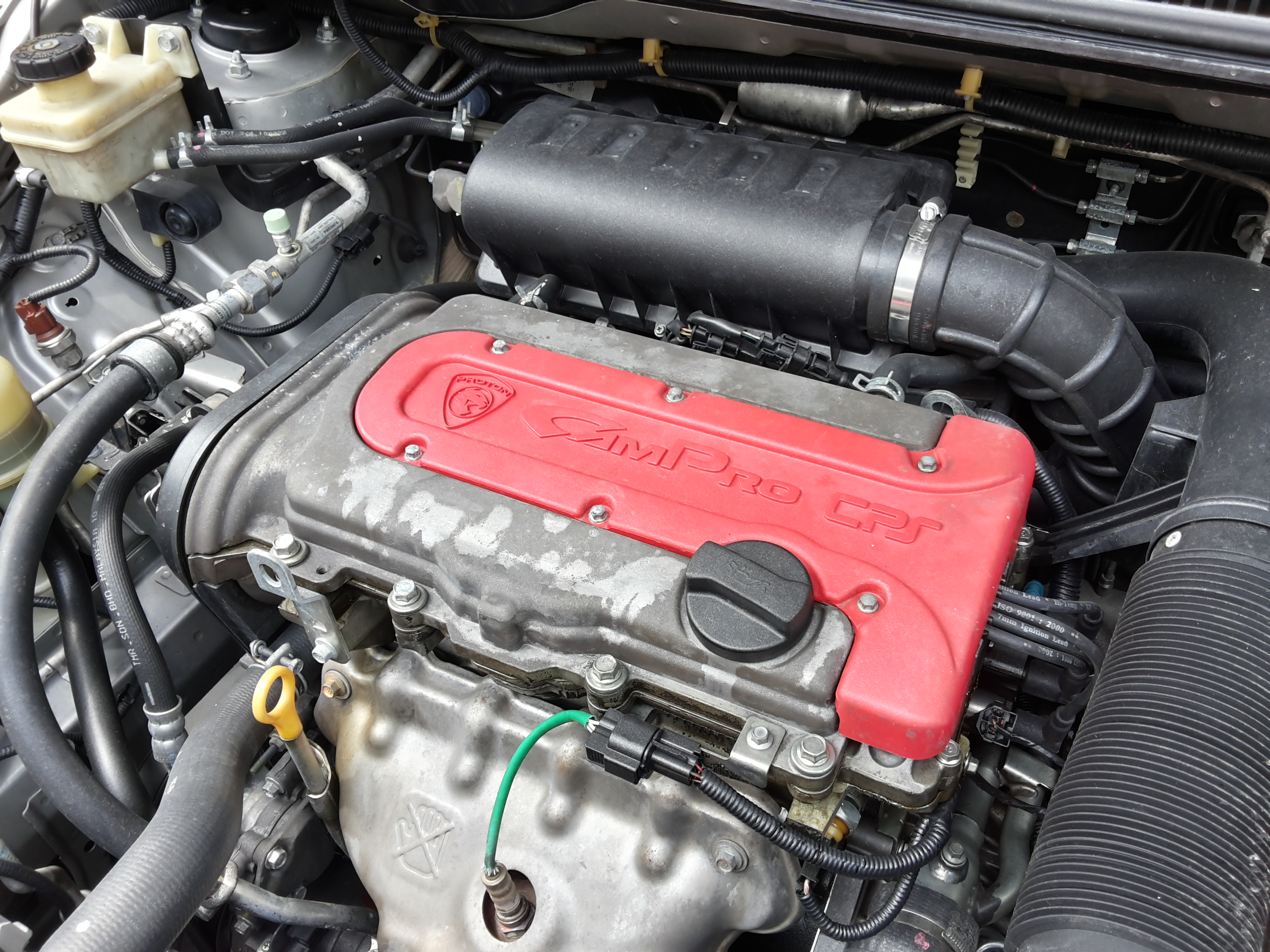

Overview
- Manufacturer: PROTON Holdings
- Production: 2004–2026

Layout
- Configuration: Straight-4
- Displacement: 1.3 and 1.6
- Valvetrain: DOHC

Combustion
- Turbocharger: BorgWarner KP39 (On Campro CFE)
- Fuel system: Fuel Injection
- Fuel type: Petrol
- Cooling system: Water-cooled

The Proton CamPro engine is an internal combustion engine manufactured by Malaysian automobile company Proton Holdings. It is the first engine model to be developed in-house by Proton.

The name CamPro is short for "cam profiling". This engine powers the Proton Gen-2, Proton Satria Neo, Proton Waja Campro, Proton Persona, Proton Saga, Proton Exora, Proton Preve, Proton Suprima S and Proton Iriz.

The CamPro engine was created to show Proton's ability to make its own engines that produce good power output and meet newer emission standards. The engine prototype was first unveiled on 6 October 2000 at the Lotus factory in UK before it debuted in the 2004 Proton Gen•2.

All CamPro engines incorporate drive-by-wire technology (specifically electronic throttle control) for better response, eliminating the need for friction-generating mechanical linkages and cables.

== CamPro technical specifications ==
	1.3 L CamPro	1.6 L CamPro	1.3 L CamPro IAFM	1.6 L CamPro IAFM	1.3 L CamPro IAFM+	1.6 L CamPro IAFM+	1.6 L CamPro CPS	1.6 L CamPro CFE	1.3 L VVT	1.6 L VVT
Valve mechanism	16-Valve MPFI DOHC	16-Valve MPFI DOHC	16-Valve MPFI DOHC	16-Valve MPFI DOHC	16-Valve MPFI DOHC	16-Valve MPFI DOHC	16-Valve VVL/MPFI DOHC	16-Valve VVT Turbo Charged DOHC	16-Valve VVT DOHC	16-Valve VVT DOHC
Total displacement	1,332 cc	1,597 cc	1,332 cc	1,597 cc	1,332 cc	1,597 cc	1,597 cc	1,561 cc	1,332 cc	1,597 cc
Bore	76 mm (3.0 in)	76 mm (3.0 in)	76 mm (3.0 in)	76 mm (3.0 in)	76 mm (3.0 in)	76 mm (3.0 in)	76 mm (3.0 in)	76 mm (3.0 in)	76 mm (3.0 in)	76 mm (3.0 in)
Stroke	73.4 mm (2.9 in)	88 mm (3.5 in)	73.4 mm (2.9 in)	88 mm (3.5 in)	73.4 mm (2.9 in)	88 mm (3.5 in)	88 mm (3.5 in)	86 mm (3.4 in)	73.4 mm (2.9 in)	88 mm (3.5 in)
Max output (/rpm)	70 kW (95 PS; 94 hp) /6000	82 kW (111 PS; 110 hp) /6000	73 kW (99 PS; 98 hp) /6500	81 kW (110 PS; 109 hp) /6500	70 kW (95 PS; 94 hp) /5750	81 kW (110 PS; 109 hp) /5750	93 kW (126 PS; 125 hp) /6500	103 kW (140 PS; 138 hp) /5000	70 kW (95 PS; 94 hp) /5750	80 kW (109 PS; 107 hp) /5750
Max torque (/rpm)	120 N⋅m (89 lb⋅ft) /4000	148 N⋅m (109 lb⋅ft) /4000	113.2 N⋅m (83 lb⋅ft) /4000	148 N⋅m (109 lb⋅ft) /4000	120 N⋅m (89 lb⋅ft) /4000	150 N⋅m (111 lb⋅ft) /4000	150 N⋅m (111 lb⋅ft) /4500	205 N⋅m (151 lb⋅ft) /2000-4000	120 N⋅m (89 lb⋅ft) /4000	150 N⋅m (111 lb⋅ft) /4000
Fuel type	Petrol									

== Variants ==
=== Original CamPro engine ===
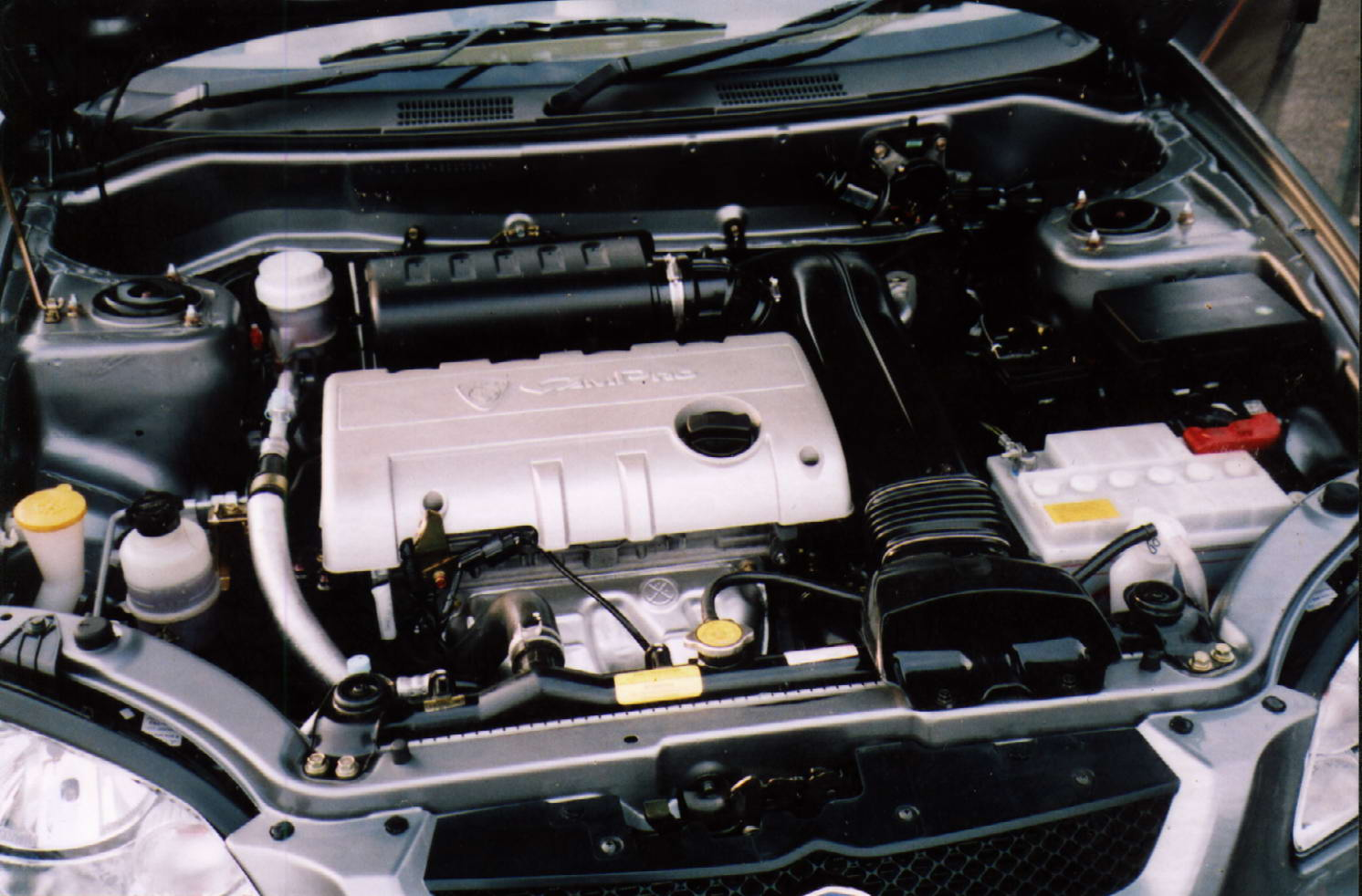
The first CamPro engine used in older Gen-2 models

The first CamPro engine made its debut in 2004 fitted to the newly released Gen•2 models. It was codenamed S4PH and was a DOHC 16-valve 1.6-litre engine that produced 110 bhp (82 kW) of power at 6,000 rpm and 148 N⋅m (109 ft⋅lbf) of torque at 4,000 rpm. The S4PH engine was ironically not equipped with Cam Profile Switching (CPS) even though its Campro designation was an abbreviation of Cam Profile Switching. It also lacked the Variable Inlet Manifold (VIM) technology of later CamPro engines. Proton also produced a 1.3-litre version of this original CamPro engine and codenamed it S4PE.

Even though the S4PH engine had contemporary maximum power and torque outputs, its performance was reportedly sluggish in real world driving. This performance deficiency was attributed to a pronounced torque dip in the crucial 2,500 to 3,500 rpm mid engine speed range where torque actually decreased before picking up back to the maximum torque level at 4,000 rpm. This torque characteristic could also clearly be seen in manufacturer published engine performance curves.

The original Campro 1.3-litre variant produced 94 bhp (70 kW; 95 PS) of power at 6,000 rpm and 120 N⋅m (89 lb⋅ft) of torque at 4,000 rpm, again contemporary outputs for a 1.3-litre passenger car engine of the time. This engine also displayed a torque dip in the mid engine speed range, similar to the one in the larger variant.

The bore x stroke dimensions for both engines are as follows:-

- S4PH (1.6L): 76 mm (3.0 in) x 88 mm (3.5 in), resulting the displacement of 1,598 cc.
- S4PE (1.3L): 76 mm (3.0 in) x 73.4 mm (2.9 in), resulting the displacement of 1,332 cc.

Applications:

- 2004–2008 Proton Gen-2
- 2006–2008 Proton Waja
- 2006–2009 Proton Satria Neo (Lite & M-Line)
- 2007–2008 Proton Persona
- 2010–2015 Youngman Lotus L5

=== CamPro CPS and VIM engine ===
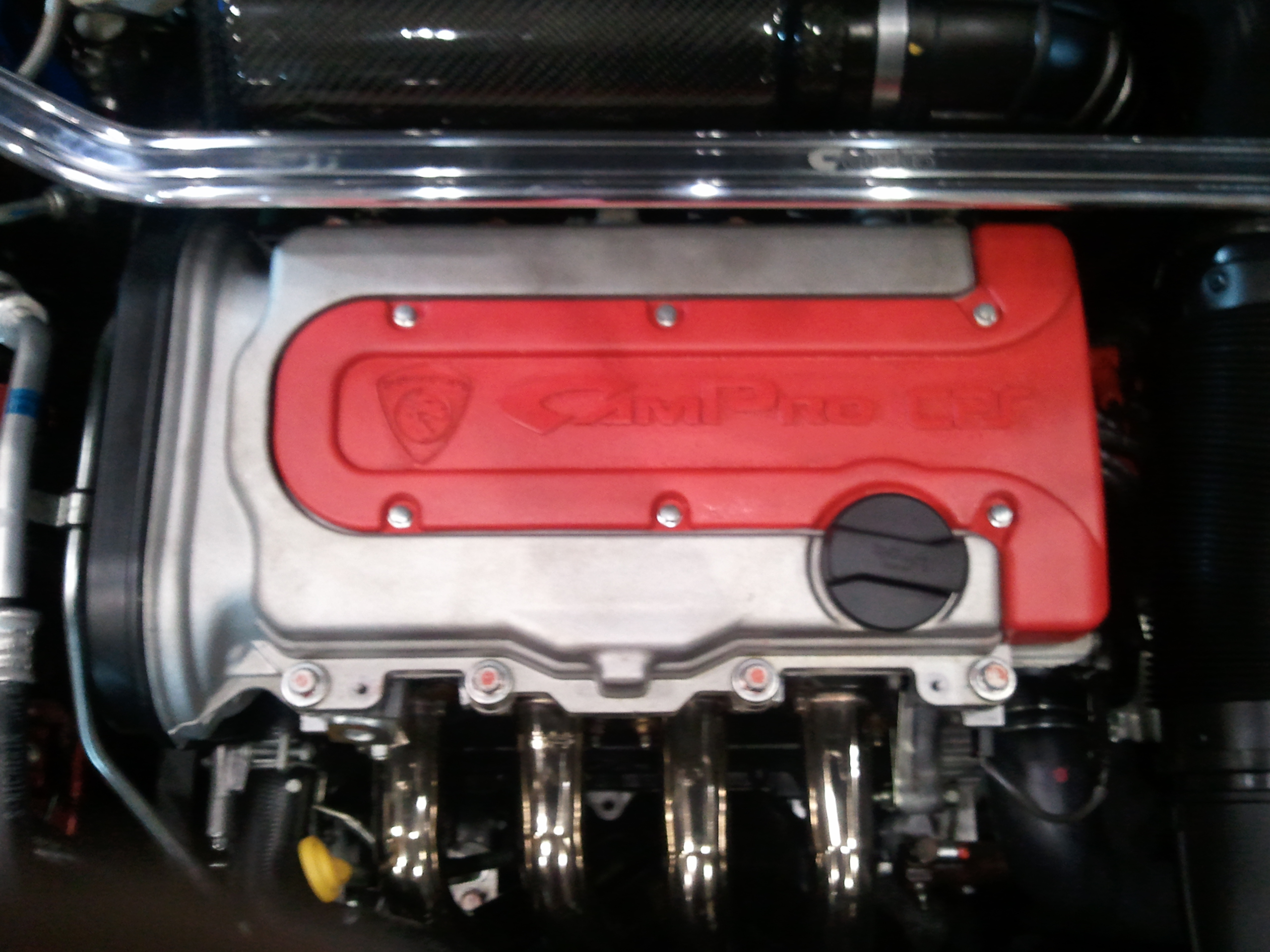
The Campro CPS 1.6L engine inside the Proton Satria Neo CPS R3 engine bay

The CamPro CPS engine uses a variable valve lift system (Cam Profile Switching system) and a variable length intake manifold (VIM; not to be confused with the stand-alone IAFM used in the 2008 Proton Saga) to boost maximum power and improve the CPS engine's torque curve over the original CamPro engine.

The engine's Variable-length Intake Manifold (VIM) switches between a long intake manifold at low engine speeds and a short intake manifold at higher engine speeds. Proton cars use a longer intake manifold to achieve slower air flow; as it was found that promotes better mixing with fuel. The short intake manifold allows more air in faster. This is beneficial at high RPMs.

The Cam Profile Switching (CPS) system uses a tri-lobe camshaft to switch between two different cam profiles. One cam profile provides low valve lift, while the other cam profile has a high valve lift. The low valve lift cam profile is used at low to mid engine speeds to maintain idling quality and reduce emissions, while the high lift cam profile is used when the engine is spinning at mid to high engine speeds improve peak horsepower and torque. Unlike the other similar variable valve timing systems such as the Honda VTEC, the Toyota VVT-i and the Mitsubishi MIVEC which use rocker arm locking pins to change the valve timing, the CPS system uses direct-acting tappets with locking pins to change the valve timing and lift profile.

VIM switches from the long to short runner at 4,800 rpm, while the CPS system switches over at 3,800 rpm (4,400 rpm in the Proton Satria Neo CPS). The result is 125 bhp (93 kW; 127 PS) at 6,500 rpm and 150 N⋅m (110 ft⋅lbf) of torque at 4,500 rpm compared to the non-CPS CamPro's 110 bhp (82 kW; 112 PS) at 6,000 rpm and 148 N⋅m (109 ft⋅lbf) of torque at 4,000 rpm. Proton claims that there is better response and torque at low engine speeds of between 2000 - 2500 rpm.

The new CPS engine first made its debut in the face-lifted Proton Gen•2 launched in Thailand in 2008, and made its first Malaysian debut in the Proton Waja CamPro 1.6 Premium (CPS). Applications:

- 2008–2010 Proton Gen-2 (H-line)
- 2008–2011 Proton Waja
- 2009–2015 Proton Satria Neo (H-Line)
- 2009–2016 Proton Exora
- 2010–2012 Proton Gen-2 Facelift (M-Line)

=== CamPro IAFM engine ===
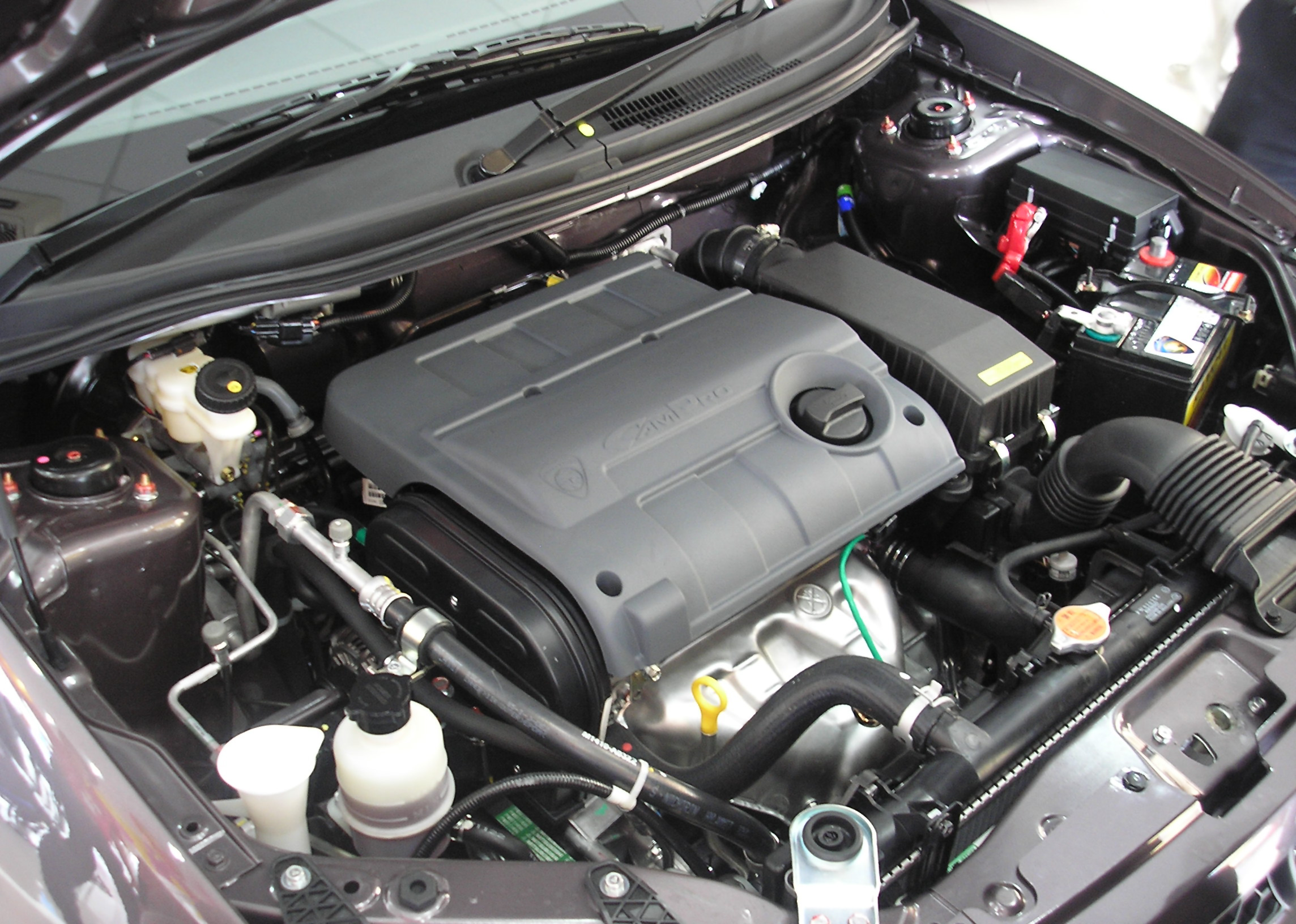
A Campro 1.3L IAFM mounted in a second generation Proton Saga

The CamPro IAFM (Intake Air-Fuel Module) is essentially an original CamPro engine equipped with a variable-length intake manifold, developed under a joint fast track programme that began in April 2005 by EPMB, Bosch and Proton. However, the IAFM differs from the VIM (Variable Inlet Manifold) for the CamPro CPS engine as follows:

1. The IAFM is a stand-alone module that can be fitted with an original CamPro engine whereas the VIM needs to work in conjunction with the CPS system in a CamPro CPS engine.
2. The IAFM is operated by the engine vacuum, while the VIM uses an ECU-controlled solenoid.

The Intake Air-Fuel Module for Proton's CamPro engine debuted in the second-generation Proton Saga, which was launched on 18 January 2008. It was first made known to the public in October 2006, when it was still in its advanced tooling stages.

With the IAFM, the 1.3L engine used in the Proton Saga now produces 98 bhp (73 kW) @ 6,500rpm. The maximum torque is slightly reduced to 113.2 N⋅m (83.5 ft⋅lbf); however, the engine has broader torque range and the noticeable torque dip in the original CamPro engine has been eliminated. The official brochure is only published with the familiar 94 bhp (70 kW; 95 PS) at 6,000 rpm power and 120 N⋅m (89 lb⋅ft) at 4,000 rpm torque for consistency with other 1.3-litre Proton models.

Meanwhile, the output of the 1.6-litre version of the IAFM engine which debuted in the 2008 Proton Gen-2 M-Line produces 110 bhp (82 kW) @ 6,500 rpm of power and 148 N⋅m (109 ft⋅lbf) of torque, and the torque dip around 2,500-3,500 rpm has been eliminated. While the IAFM works great when it was new, the quality of parts are not durable over long term. When the solenoid breaks, the flap can no longer be functional to direct air in the manifold and causes it to produce the infamous 'tak, tak, tak' sound, similar to the noise of tappets while also making it a major vacuum leak to the engine.

== CamPro IAFM+ engine ==
The second-generation Campro IAFM engine, known as IAFM+ engine, debuted in the 2011 Proton Saga FLX. The new IAFM+ engine is tweaked to be paired with the new CVT gearbox by Punch Powertrain that requires the maximum operating engine speed to be reduced from the previous 6,500 rpm in the first-generation IAFM engine to only 6,000 rpm. As a result, the 1.3L IAFM+ engine produces 94 bhp (70 kW) @ 5,750 rpm of horsepower and 120 N⋅m (89 ft⋅lbf) of torque, while the 1.6L IAFM+ engine produces 108 bhp (81 kW) @ 5,750 rpm of horsepower and 150 N⋅m (110 ft⋅lbf) of torque. The combination of the new Campro IAFM+ engine with the CVT gearbox results 4% and 10% reduction on fuel consumption for urban and highway driving respectively.

Applications:

- 2008–2016 Proton Saga
- 2008–2010 Proton Gen-2 (M-line)
- 2008–2016 Proton Persona
- 2012–2018 Proton Preve

=== Hybrid CamPro engine ===
In March 2007, Proton and Lotus have announced their concept model of a Proton Gen-2 powered by a hybrid powerplant that uses the CamPro engine. The concept model was revealed during the 2007 Geneva Motor Show from 8 ~ 18 March 2007.

The hybrid power-plant system, which is known as EVE system (Efficient, Viable, Environmental) will be using the same S4PH engine as the one that powers the present gasoline version of the Gen•2, combined with a 30 kW, 144V electric motor. The main purpose of the hybrid powerplant system is to provide a hybrid system that can be retrofitted to existing models, retaining the same power-plant and also eliminating the need to develop a completely different platform, like the Honda Civic Hybrid. Unlike the IMA (Integrated Motor Assist) technology in the Civic Hybrid that uses a bulky Ni-MH battery pack, the EVE Hybrid system will use a Li-ion battery pack inside the engine bay.

The EVE Hybrid System will have 3 key technologies:

1. "Micro-hybrid" start-stop system - An integrated starter-alternator system is installed to switch off the engine automatically when the engine stops, for example at a traffic light. The engine will automatically restart when the gas pedal is depressed.
2. Full parallel hybrid technology - Combines the existing S4PH engine with a 30 kW, 144V electric motor, resulting in higher power (141 bhp combined), higher torque (233 N-m combined), lower emission (up to 22% carbon dioxide reduction) and better fuel economy (up to 4.6 L/100 km). The system also includes regenerative braking system.
3. Continuously Variable Transmission (CVT) - The CVT system provides an infinite number of gear ratios for better efficiency.

The combined power and torque for the power-plant system are as follows:

- Max power (gasoline engine only): 110 bhp (82 kW; 112 PS) @ 6,000 rpm
- Max torque (gasoline engine only): 148 N⋅m (109 lb⋅ft) @ 4,000 rpm
- Max power (combined): 141 bhp (105 kW; 143 PS) @ 5,500 rpm
- Max torque (combined): 233 N⋅m (172 lb⋅ft) @ 1,500rpm (limited to 180 N⋅m (133 lb⋅ft) continuous)

Proton will start commercialising their upcoming hybrid vehicles equipped with the EVE Hybrid System in the future.

== CamPro CFE & VVT engine ==
The CamPro CFE engine is the light-pressure intercooled turbocharged version of the 1.6-litre CamPro engine, with the maximum boost pressure of 0.75 bar (75 kPa; 10.9 psi). The CFE is the acronym of "Charged Fuel Efficiency".

The idea of the production was first revealed by Proton Managing Director Datuk Syed Zainal Abidin on 13 December 2008, due to the new market trend of having small displacement engine but forced-aspirated to produce the power output equivalent to a larger motor, a similar concept as the Volkswagen TSI twincharger technology and the Ford EcoBoost engine. The finalised engine was debuted during the KLIMS 2010.

The engine is capable of producing 138 bhp (103 kW; 140 PS) at 5,000 rpm of power and 205 N⋅m (151 lb⋅ft) at 2,000-4,000 rpm of torque. To accommodate the increase of engine power, several changes to the technical specification have been done. While the engine bore remains at 76 mm (3.0 in), the stroke is shortened to 86 mm (3.4 in) compared with 88 mm (3.5 in) as in other 1.6L Campro engine variants, resulting the engine displacement of 1561 cc. A variable valve timing mechanism is also added for the intake valves, but it alters the cam phasing and valve opening timing continuously rather than altering the valve lift at a preset engine speed as in the CPS mechanism. In 2016, a public recall affecting more than 90,000 CamPro CFE equipped vehicles took place for the oil cooler hose. Together with the recall, service intervals for oil cooler hose replacement were lowered to every 40,000 kilometres. The intervals was increased to every 80,000 kilometres following the availability of a higher quality oil cooler hose in 2018 replacing an all rubber component from before with a part rubber, part metal component.

Applications:

- 2011–2023 Proton Exora
- 2012–2018 Proton Preve
- 2013–2019 Proton Suprima S

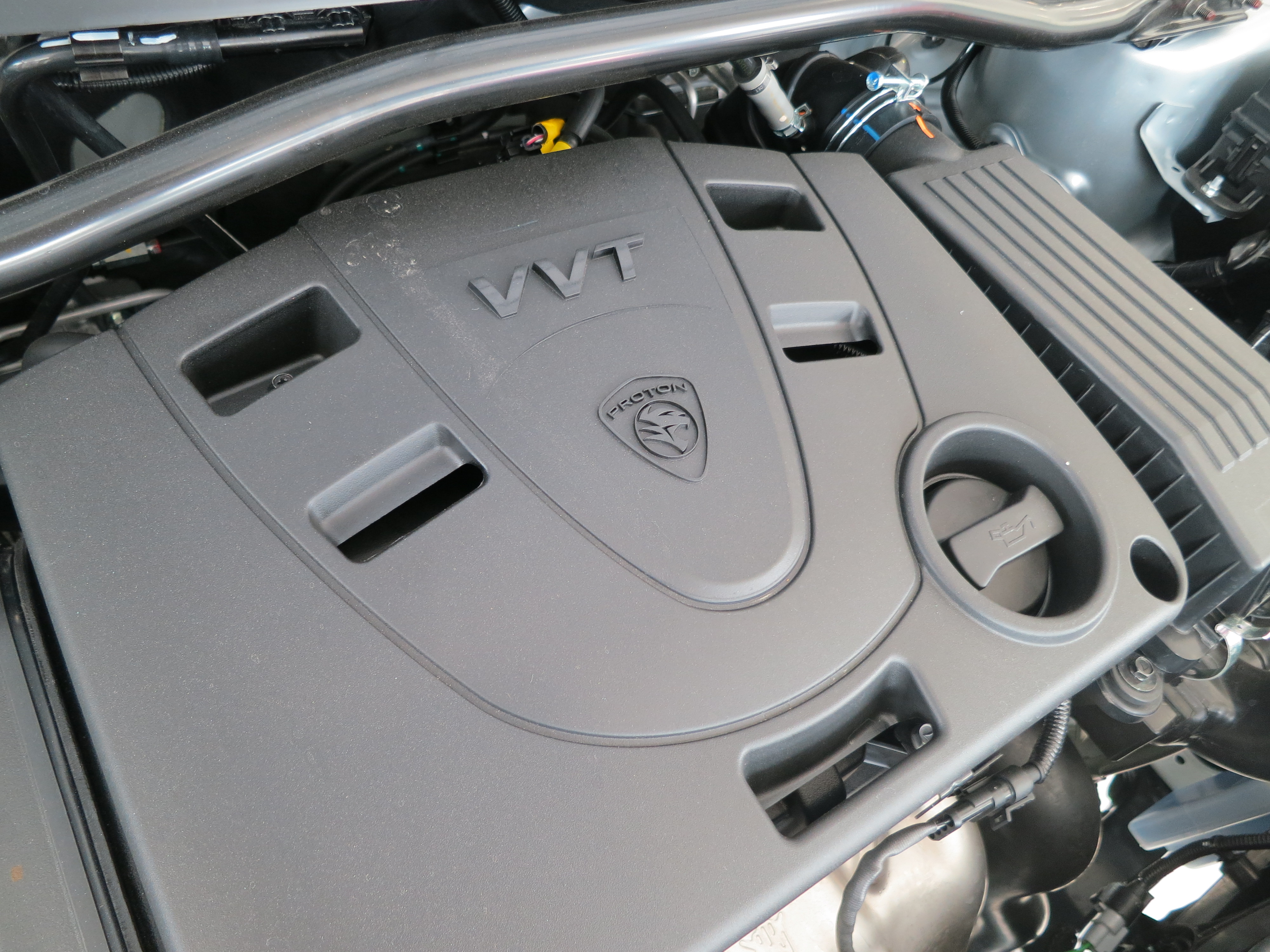
A Campro 1.3L VVT mounted in a third generation Proton Saga

=== VVT engine ===
The VVT (Variable Valve Timing) engine was unveiled in September 2014 with its first application in the Proton Iriz. The VVT engine has a new block, new pistons and new valves, and incorporates variable valve timing (VVT). However, some technology in the new VVT family is shared with the old CamPro, but due to the various changes and modifications made to the CamPro family over the past decade, Proton has decided not to use the 'CamPro' nameplate after its 2014 revision. However, older models like the Exora, Prevé and Suprima S will continue to use the old 'CamPro' name until it is eventually retired in favour of the upcoming GDi engines.

The latest application of the VVT engine in the 2016 Proton Persona, 2017 Proton Iriz and Proton Saga features Proton's ECO Drive Assist program. The system assesses the driver's throttle input, and a green indicator on the instrument cluster will light up when the car is being driven in an economical manner.

The engine is capable to produce 94 bhp (70 kW; 95 PS) at 5,750 rpm of power and 120 N⋅m (89 lb⋅ft) at 4,000 rpm of torque for the 1.3 variant compared to the 1.6 variant which delivers 107 bhp (80 kW; 108 PS) at 5,750 rpm of power and 150 N⋅m (111 lb⋅ft) at 4,000 rpm of torque. While the engine bore for the 1.3 variant is 76 mm (3.0 in), the stroke is 73.4 mm (2.9 in) compared with the 1.6 variant which is 88 mm (3.5 in).

The VVT engines are like the CFE engines with the VVT for the intake valves.

Applications:

- 2014–2025 Proton Iriz
- 2016–2026 Proton Persona (equipped only with 1.6 variant)
- 2016–2025 Proton Saga (equipped only with 1.3 variant)

== Future plans ==
Currently, Proton is planning to develop a new engine known as the code name "GDi/TGDi engine" with option of displacement between 1.0/1.2L three cylinders,1.3/1.5 naturally aspirated and turbocharged and progressively 2.0 L, 2.3 L all in the variant of either natural aspirated or in force induction type. The existing CamPro engines which are limited to 1.3-litre and 1.6-litre engine options only will be EOL (End of Life) soon after. The 1.3 and 1.5 turbo slated to churns out 140 hp/210 nm & 180 hp/250 nm respectively.
