= Electronic brakeforce distribution =

Automotive braking technology

typical braking system for cars with brakeforce distribution: FAD: Brake disc front FPD: Brake disc rear FPT: Rear brake drum CF: Brake control SF: servo brake PF: Brake Pump SLF: Brake Fluid Reservoir RF: Splitter braking FS: Parking Brake

Electronic brakeforce distribution (EBD or EBFD) or electronic brakeforce limitation (EBL) is an automobile brake technology that automatically varies the amount of force applied to each of a vehicle's wheels, based on road conditions, speed, loading, etc, thus providing intelligent control of both brake balance and overall brake force. Always coupled with anti-lock braking systems (ABS), EBD can apply more or less braking pressure to each wheel in order to maximize stopping power whilst maintaining vehicular control. Typically, the front end carries more weight and EBD distributes less braking pressure to the rear brakes so the rear brakes do not lock up and cause a skid. In some systems, EBD distributes more braking pressure at the rear brakes during initial brake application before the effects of weight transfer become apparent.

== ABS ==
Vehicle wheels may lock-up due to excessive wheel torque over tire–road friction forces available, caused by too much hydraulic line pressure. The ABS monitors wheel speeds and releases pressure on individual wheel brake lines, rapidly pulsing individual brakes to prevent lock-up. During heavy braking, preventing wheel lock-up helps the driver maintain steering control. Four channel ABS systems have an individual brake line for each of the four wheels, enabling different braking pressure on different road surfaces. Three channel systems are equipped with a sensor for each wheel, but control the rear brakes as a single unit. For example, less braking pressure is needed to lock a wheel on ice than a wheel that is on bare asphalt. If the left wheels are on asphalt and the right wheels are on ice, during an emergency stop, ABS detects the right wheels are about to lock and reduces braking force on the right front wheel. Four channel systems also reduce brake force on the right rear wheel, while a three channel system would also reduce force on both back wheels. Both systems help avoid lock-up and loss of vehicle control.

== EBD ==
As per the technical paper published by Buschmann et al., "The job of the EBD as a subsystem of the ABS system is to control the effective adhesion utilization by the rear wheels. The pressure of the rear wheels are approximated to the ideal brake force distribution in a partial braking operation. To do so, the conventional brake design is modified in the direction of rear axle overbraking, and the components of the ABS are used. EBD reduces the strain on the hydraulic brake force proportioning valve in the vehicle. EBD optimizes the brake design with regard to: adhesion utilization; driving stability; wear; temperature stress; and pedal force."

EBD may work in conjunction with ABS and electronic stability control (ESC) to minimize yaw accelerations during turns. ESC compares the steering wheel angle to vehicle turning rate using a yaw rate sensor. "Yaw" is the vehicle's rotation around its vertical center of gravity (turning left or right). If the yaw sensor detects less(more) yaw than the steering wheel angle should create, the car is understeering(oversteering) and ESC activates one of the front or rear brakes to rotate the car back onto its intended course. For example, if a car is making a left turn and begins to understeer (the car plows forward to the outside of the turn) ESC activates the left rear brake, which will help turn the car left. The sensors are so sensitive and the actuation is so quick that the system may correct direction before the driver reacts. ABS helps prevent wheel lock-up and EBD helps apply appropriate brake force to make ESC work effectively and easily.

== See also ==
- Brake assist
- Cornering brake control
- Automobile safety
