= Proton Tiara =

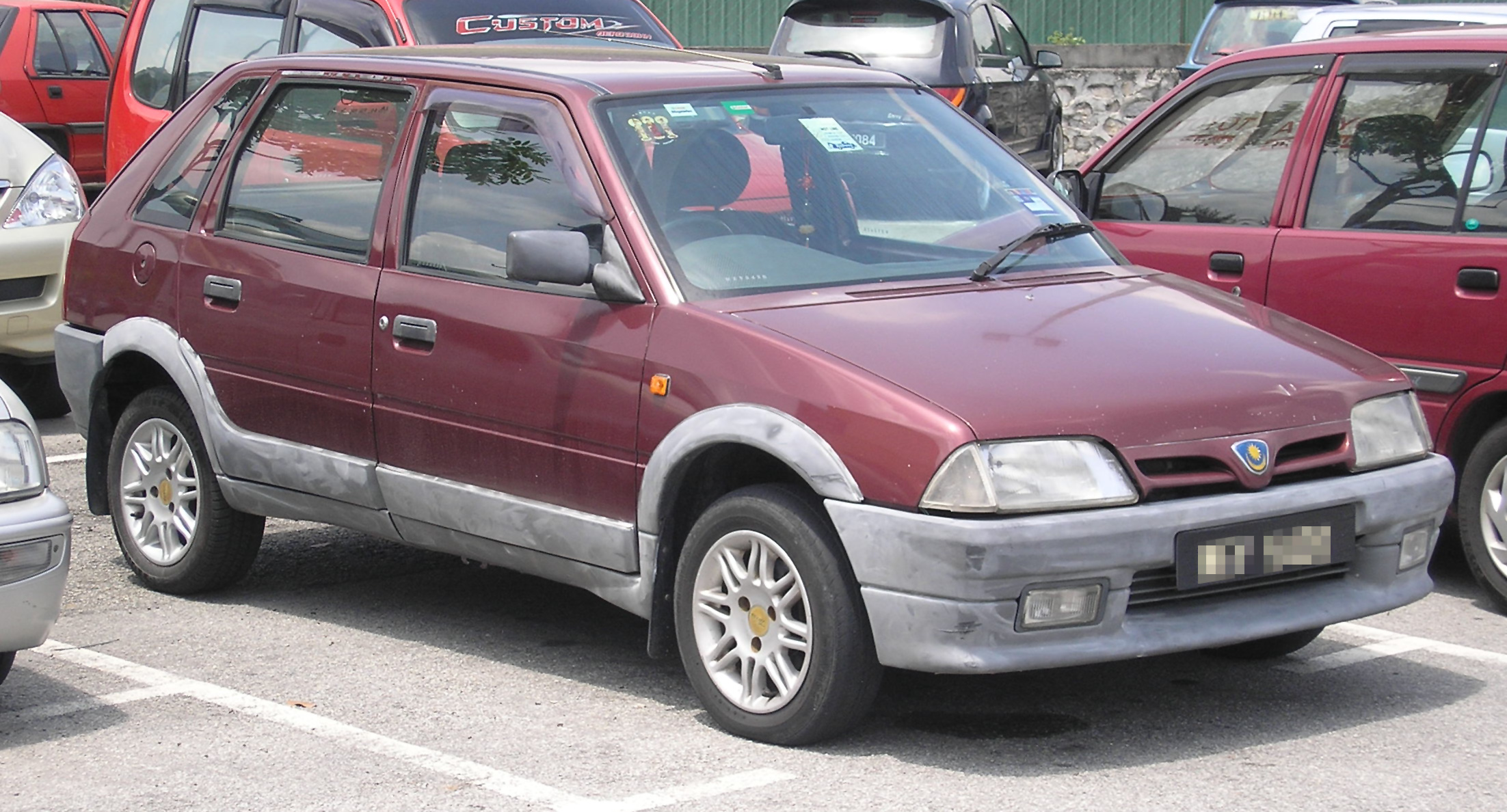

Overview
- Manufacturer: Proton
- Also called: Citroën AX
- Production: 1996–2000
- Assembly: Malaysia: Pekan, Pahang (AMM)

Body and chassis
- Class: Supermini
- Body style: 5-door hatchback
- Layout: Front-engine, front-wheel-drive

Powertrain
- Engine: 1.1 L TU1 I4
- Transmission: 5-speed manual

Dimensions
- Wheelbase: 2,290 mm (90.2 in)
- Length: 3,525 mm (138.8 in)
- Width: 1,555 mm (61.2 in)
- Height: 1,355 mm (53.3 in)
- Kerb weight: 780 kg (1,719.6 lb)

Chronology
- Successor: Proton Savvy

The Proton Tiara is a Malaysian supermini produced from 1996 to 2000 by Proton, built under licence from Citroën and based on the Citroën AX.

== History ==
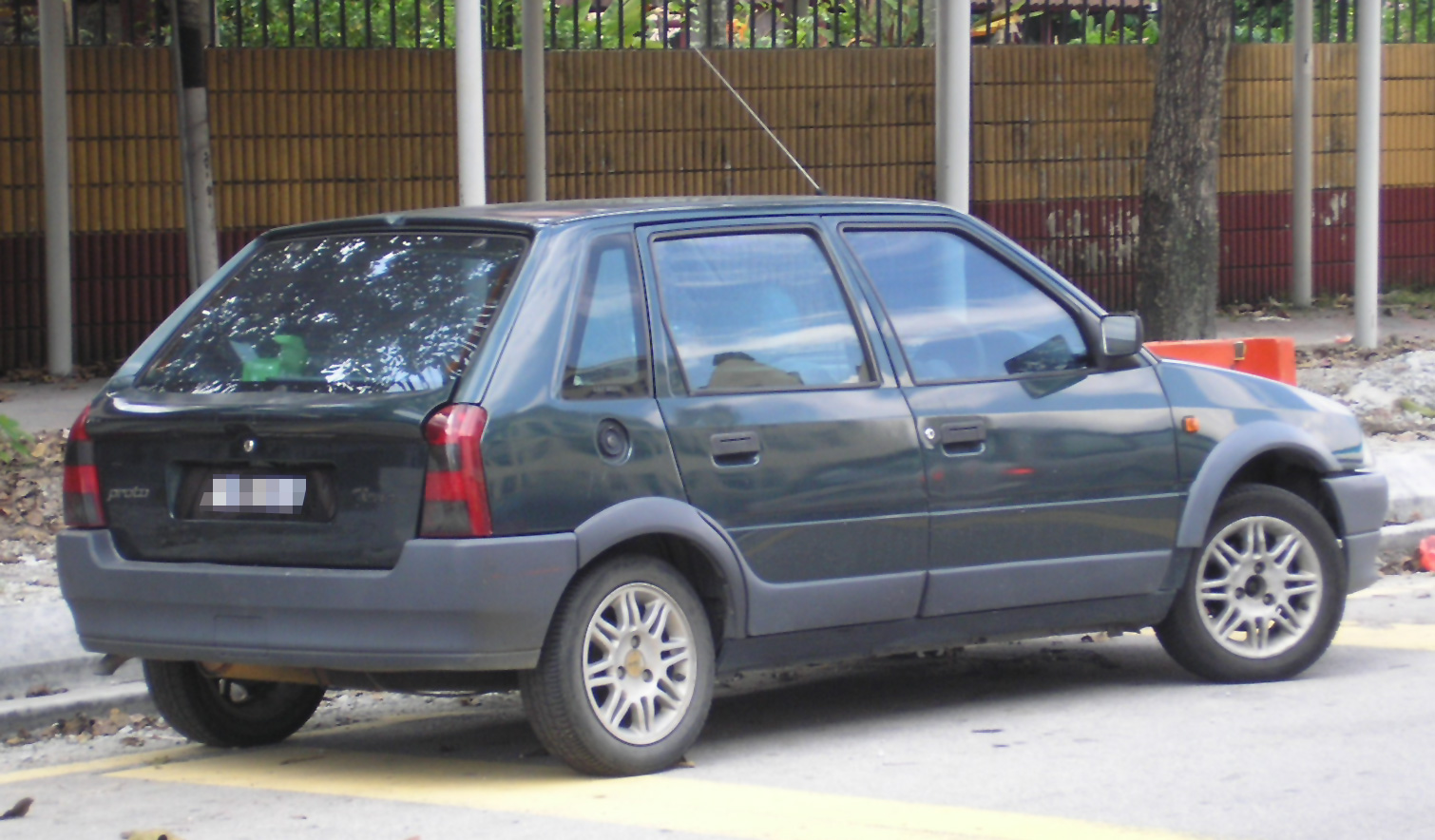
Proton Tiara rear

The genesis of the Tiara was the result of an agreement during the mid 1990s, between Proton's then CEO, Yahaya Ahmad, and PSA Peugeot Citroën, a producer of Citroën and Peugeot vehicles. Yahaya had expressed wishes that Proton did not use Mitsubishi platforms, and that Proton cooperated with PSA Peugeot Citroën for access to its diesel engines.

In April 1996, Proton began a separate joint venture with PSA to build the Tiara called USPD (Usahasama Proton DRB Sdn. Bhd.).

Yahaya Ahmad was killed in a helicopter crash in 1997, and Proton returned to using recycled Mitsubishi based platforms and parts and developed in-house designed models later. Production of the Tiara ceased in 2000, due to low sales volume; in June 2005, the Proton Savvy was launched, as an indirect successor to the Proton Tiara or Citroën AX.

== Design and market ==
The appearance of the Tiara mimicked that of more powerful Citroën AXs, such as the AX GT, but the grille was restyled to match the existing Saga and Wira models. Other cosmetic differences included different bumpers and taillight clusters. It was only available with a 1.1 litre 45 kW (60 hp) engine, paired with a five speed manual.

The Tiara sold in two variants, the material coloured bumper 1.1 GL and full body paint 1.1 GLi, and came with six colour options; silver, red, royal blue, dark green, greenish blue and grey. The Proton Tiara was sold only in the Malaysian market, as the license restricted Proton from exporting the car.

== Sales ==
Year	Malaysia (Note: Figures based on registration)
2000	1,779
2001	11
2002	4
