= Proton Savvy =

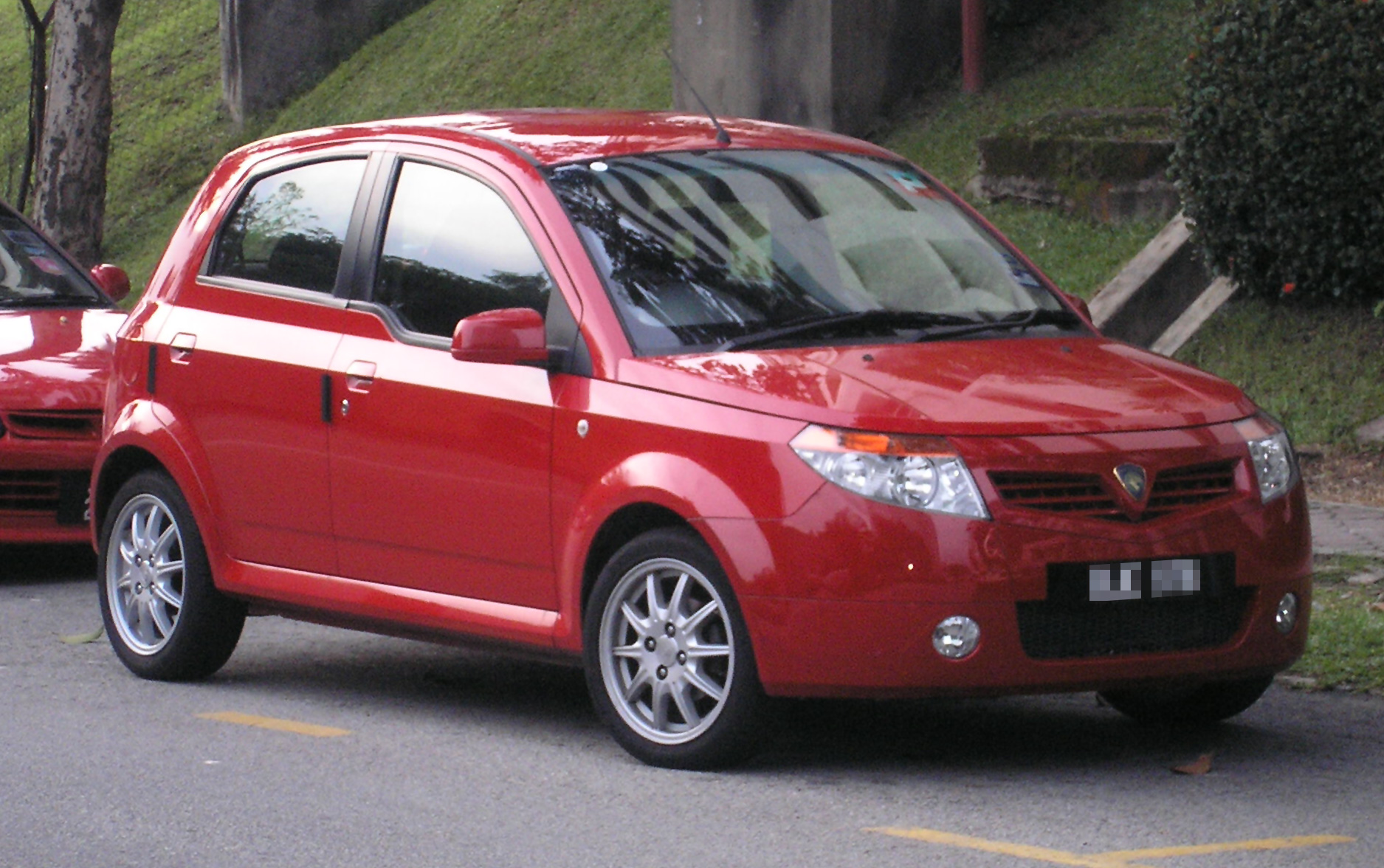
- Proton Savvy (Malaysia)

Overview
- Manufacturer: Proton
- Production: 2005–2011
- Assembly: Malaysia: Proton City, Perak

Body and chassis
- Class: Subcompact car
- Body style: 5-door hatchback
- Layout: Front-engine, front-wheel-drive
- Doors: 5

Powertrain
- Engine: 1.2 L Renault D4F I4
- Power output: 75 PS (55 kW; 74 hp) at 5500 rpm 105 N·m (77 lb·ft) at 3500 rpm
- Transmission: 5-speed manual 5-speed Magneti Marelli Quickshift 5 AMT

Dimensions
- Wheelbase: 2,395 mm (94.3 in)
- Length: 3,710 mm (146.1 in)
- Width: 1,643 mm (64.7 in)
- Height: 1,480 mm (58.3 in)
- Kerb weight: 957 kg (2,110 lb)

Chronology
- Predecessor: Proton Tiara
- Successor: Proton Iriz

The Proton Savvy is a supermini hatchback produced by Malaysian carmaker Proton. The car was introduced in June 2005, as an indirect successor to Proton Tiara. It was discontinued in 2011 due to slow sales compared to the Perodua Myvi.

== History ==
Following Proton's decision to discontinue the Citroën AX based Tiara in 2000, a replacement model was required in order for Proton to reenter the supermini market. The replacement, originally codenamed the Tiara Replacement Model (TRM) was partially designed in house by Proton, but is powered by a Renault D-Type engine.

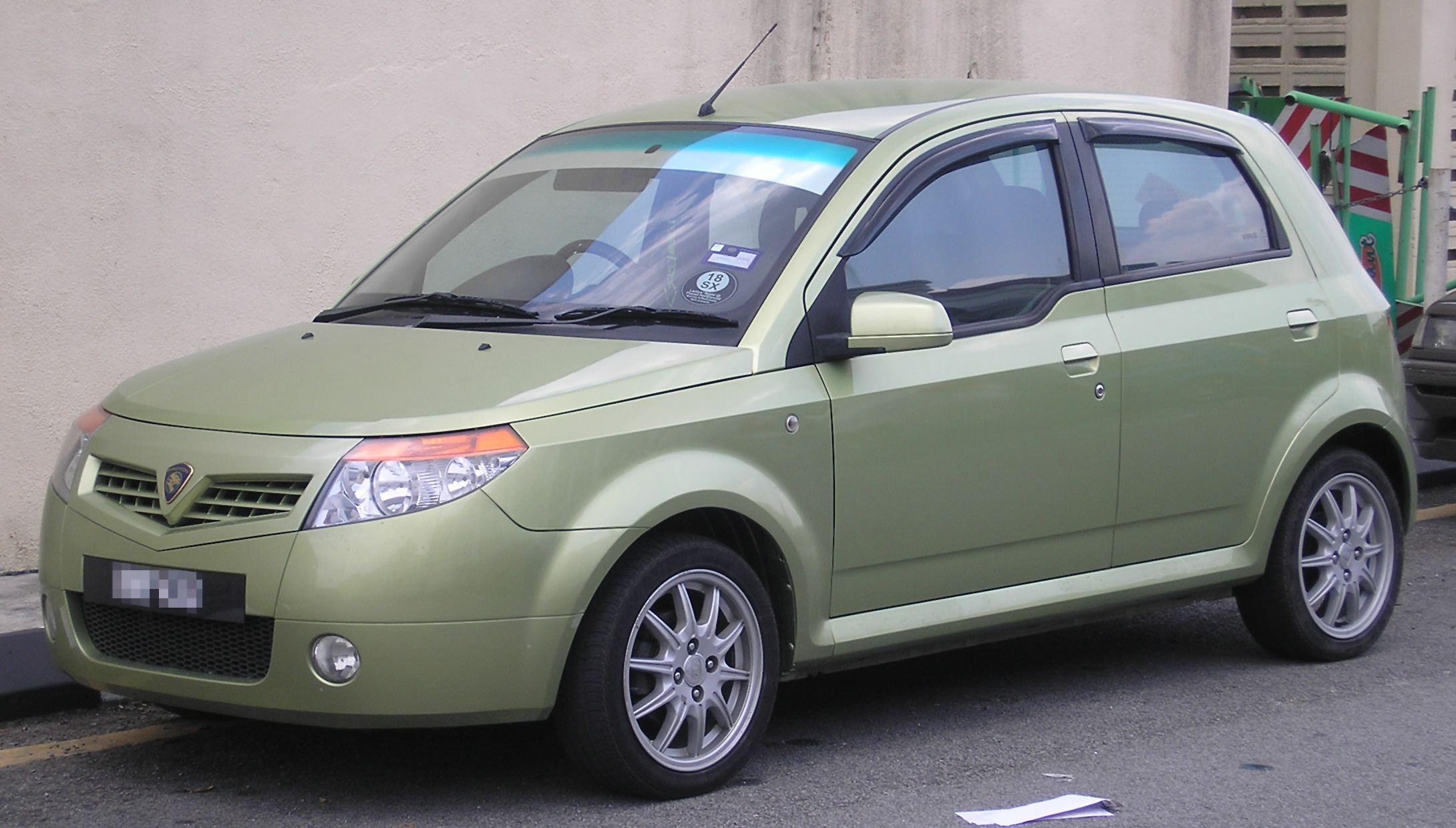
Proton Savvy pre-facelift front

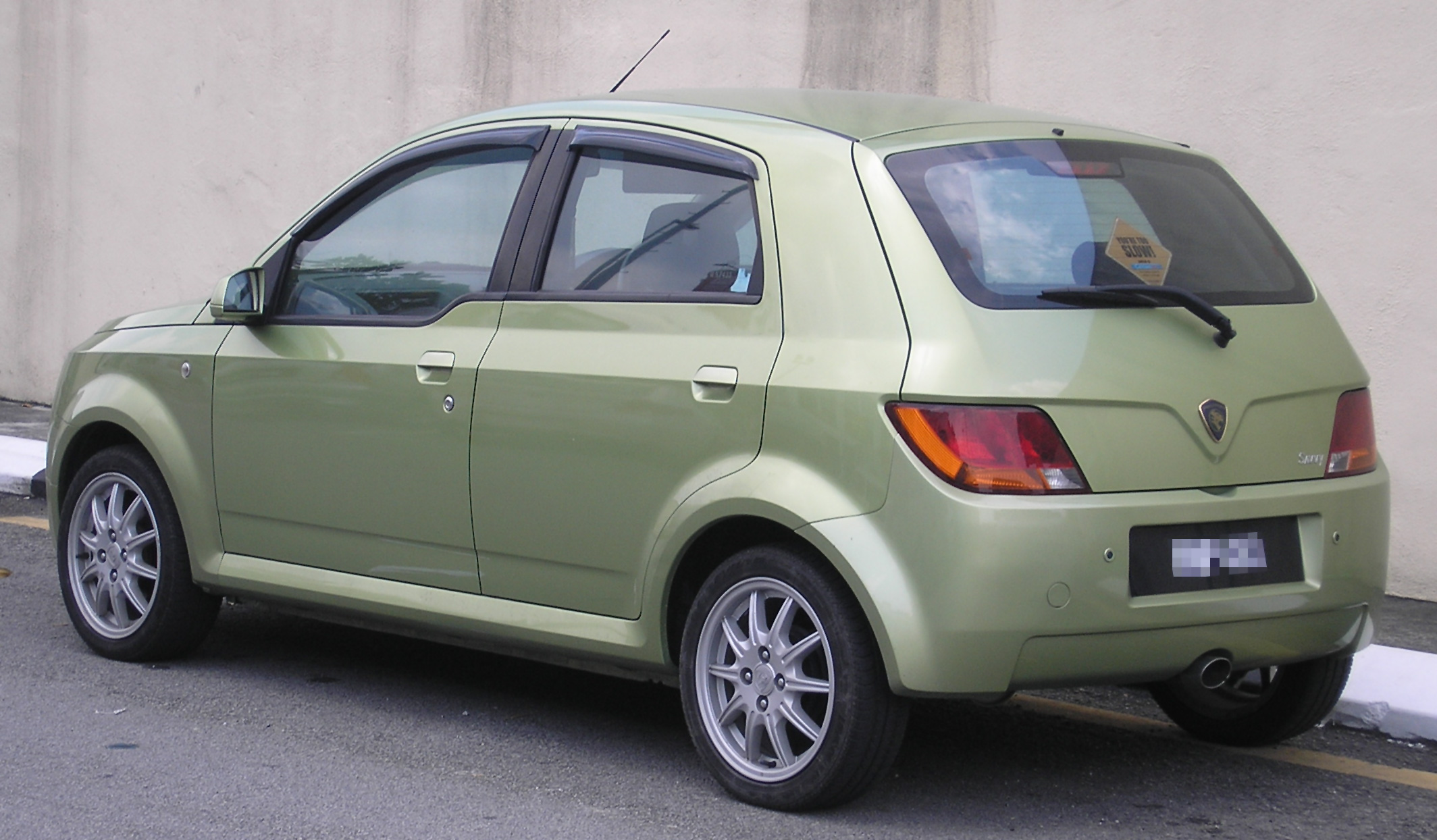
Proton Savvy pre-facelift rear

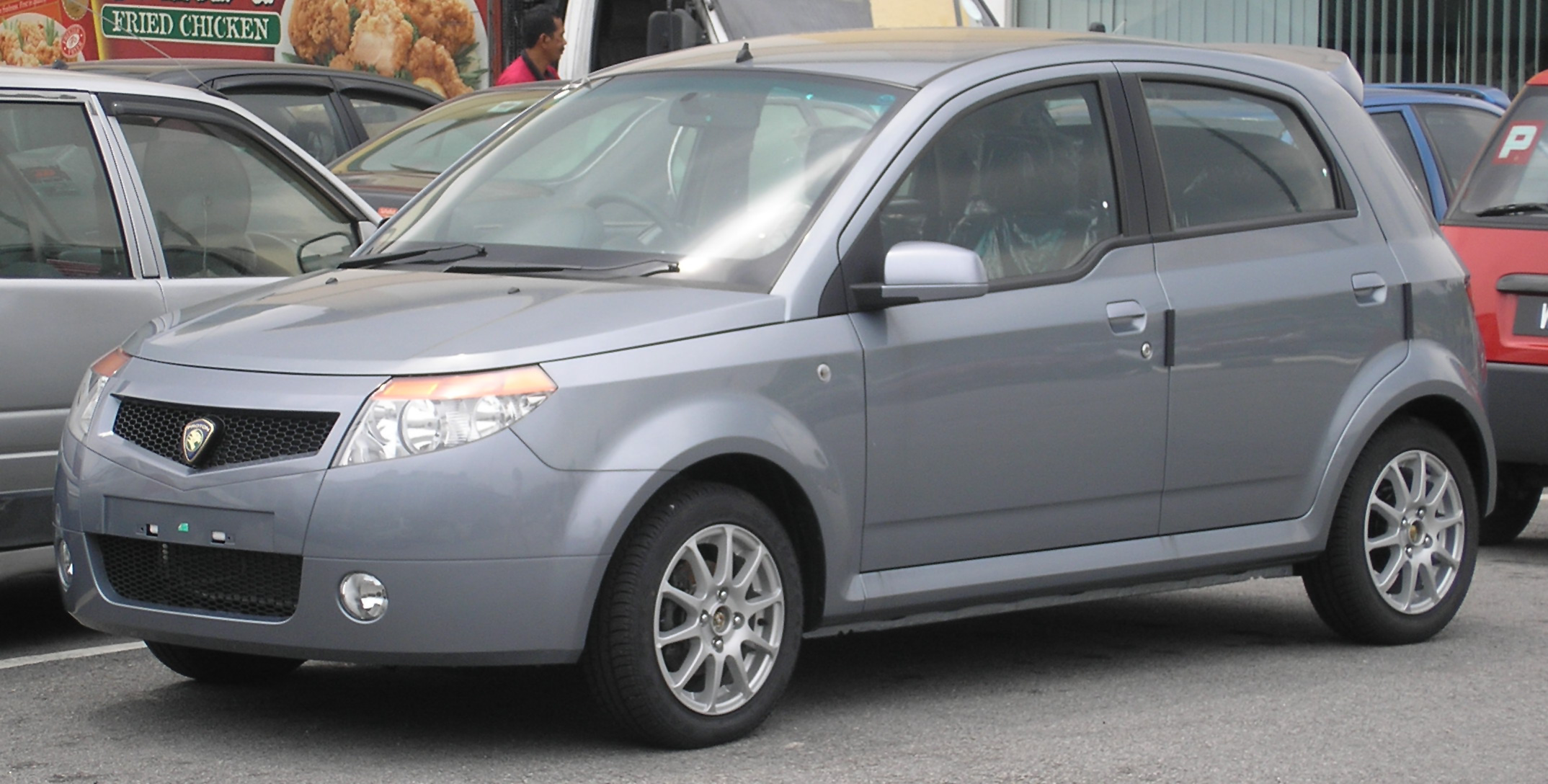
Proton Savvy post-facelift front

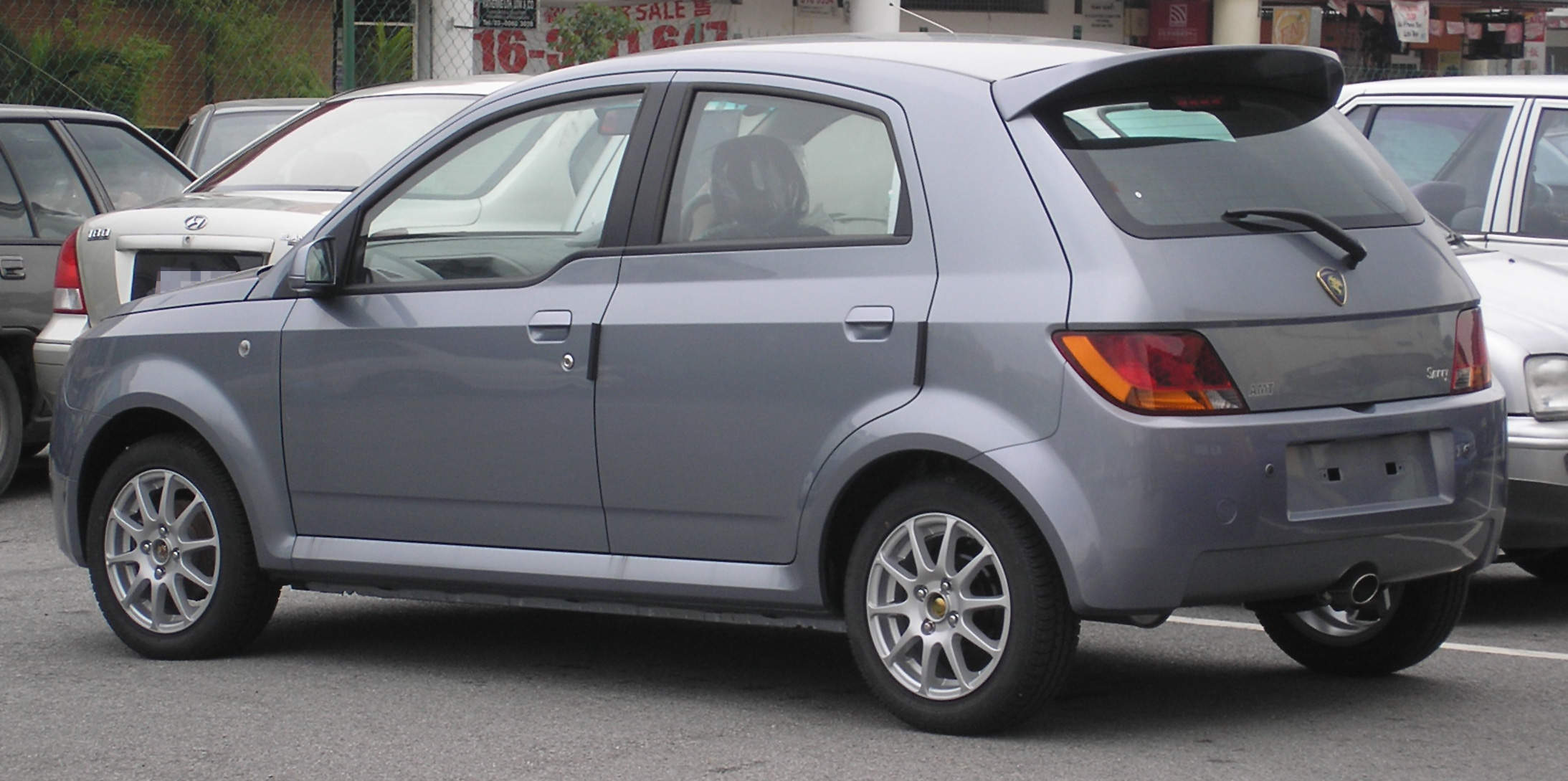
Proton Savvy post-facelift rear

The Savvy was launched in June 2005 in Malaysia as a manual transmission only model, followed by the introduction of an automated manual transmission (AMT) model in November 2005. Export models of the Savvy were introduced to the United Kingdom in September 2005.

The Savvy was also among two models (alongside the Proton Gen-2) the now-defunct MG Rover was seeking to rebadge when it entered talks with Proton's parent company during 2004.

In March 2006, Proton introduced a "Savvy Zerokit" variant developed in conjunction with the Proton's motorsports division, R3 (Race Rally Research), that included an all round bodykit and rear spoiler made from fibre-reinforced plastic, and 15-inch (380 mm) JRD 155 wheels. Additional options included "dark titanium" headlights, performance suspension and a performance rear exhaust muffler that increased the power output up by 4 hp (3 kW) to 78 hp (57 kW).

On 3 January 2007, Proton launched the Savvy facelift in left-hand drive in Taiwan. It featured an infotainment system with an integrated LCD, DVD video and audio playing capabilities.

Two weeks later on 19 January, Proton launched the Savvy facelift in Malaysia. It added two more colors — Energy Orange and Genetic Silver. The front and rear of the pre-facelift models look similar in that both have a "V" design for the logo, whereas the facelift models feature a straight horizontal grille in the front and two horizontal lines in the rear.

In July 2007, Proton announced a basic variant called Savvy Lite, of which this model has more manually controlled mechanical parts and without "expensive" features such as remote control, power windows and alarm system.

The second generation Proton Saga, launched in January 2008, based its chassis on that of the Savvy, albeit elongated to support sedan bodywork.

The Savvy is also notable for being the first Proton car to undergo a publicly announced recall. On April 1, 2008, Proton Edar ordered the recall of all 34,000 Savvys on Malaysian roads (of which their production dates were before December 17, 2007) for an inspection and replacement of the rear wheel bearings, based on a parts defect found during random checks. The announcement was a precautionary measure over potential water ingress into the Savvy's rear wheel bearing set, causing malfunction of its components.

In 2011, production of the Savvy was stopped and the car was discontinued due to very slow sales compared to the Perodua Myvi.

== Design ==
Unlike the Tiara, the Savvy's exterior design was largely developed in-house by Proton, prominently featuring a clamshell bonnet design. The Savvy is powered by a 1.2 litre D-Type SOHC 16 valve engine sourced from Renault, similar to the one used in the Renault Clio and Twingo.

The reverse gear for the manual transmission model is placed at the top left which is the position of a normal first gear position for conventional manual transmission cars. A locking mechanism is equipped to prevent the driver from accidentally shifting to reverse when shifting to the first gear, which can be unlocked by pulling up the black ring at the gear knob while shifting to reverse. This is a similar mechanism in many European cars, including Volvo and Renault cars from the mid-1990s.

The Savvy, along with other in house designed Protons such as the Gen-2, Persona, Satria Neo, Waja, Waja Chancellor, and second-generation Saga, feature turn indicator switches placed at the left-hand side, unlike models introduced earlier, such as the first generation Saga, Wira and Perdana.

== Export markets ==
The Savvy was exported to Australia, United Kingdom, South Africa, Singapore, Thailand, Taiwan, India and Indonesia.

=== Indonesia ===
The facelifted Savvy was available in two variants in Indonesia: MT and AMT.

== Electric vehicle conversion ==
During the Periklindo Electric Vehicle Show (PEVS) in 2022, the Savvy was converted into an electric car by Vixmo as the Vixmo Zero. The car's interior was modified and was equipped with autonomous driving system.

== Awards ==
The Savvy has received two known "Car of the Year" awards from two ASEAN countries, including the Cars, Bikes & Trucks's "New Straits Times/AmBank Group 2006 Car of the Year" Award in the Supermini category, and the "Best City Car" award at the 6th Indonesian Car of the Year 2007 awards. The car is also the only Proton model so far to be TÜV (Technischer Überwachungsverein) Certified.

The Savvy was voted among Thailand's Top 10 Cars in 2008, by The Nation Daily.

== Specifications ==
Powertrain Engine & Performance
Engine	4-cylinder 16-valve D4F (Engine Code:722)
Maximum Speed (km/h)	170 km/h
Acceleration 0–100 km/h (sec)	14 seconds (AMT)/ 12.2 seconds (MT)
Maximum Output hp(kW)/rpm	75 PS (55 kW) at 5500 rpm
Maximum Torque (Nm/rpm)	105 N⋅m (77 lb⋅ft) at 3500 rpm
Full tank capacity (Litre)	40
Tyres & Rims	165/60R14 75H & Alloy 14" x 5.5J or 175/50R15 75H & Alloy 15" x 5.5J
Chassis
Power Steering	Hydraulic
Suspension (Front/Rear)	MacPherson Strut Coil Spring & Stabiliser Bar/ Torsion Beam Axle
Brake (Front/Rear)	Ventilated Disc/ Drum

== Sales ==
Year	Malaysia (Note: Figures based on registration)
2005	6,881
2006	7,963
2007	5,370
2008	3,157
2009	1,763
2010	1,491
2011	472
2012	279
2013	5
2014	1
