= Proton Saga =

Model series produced by Proton

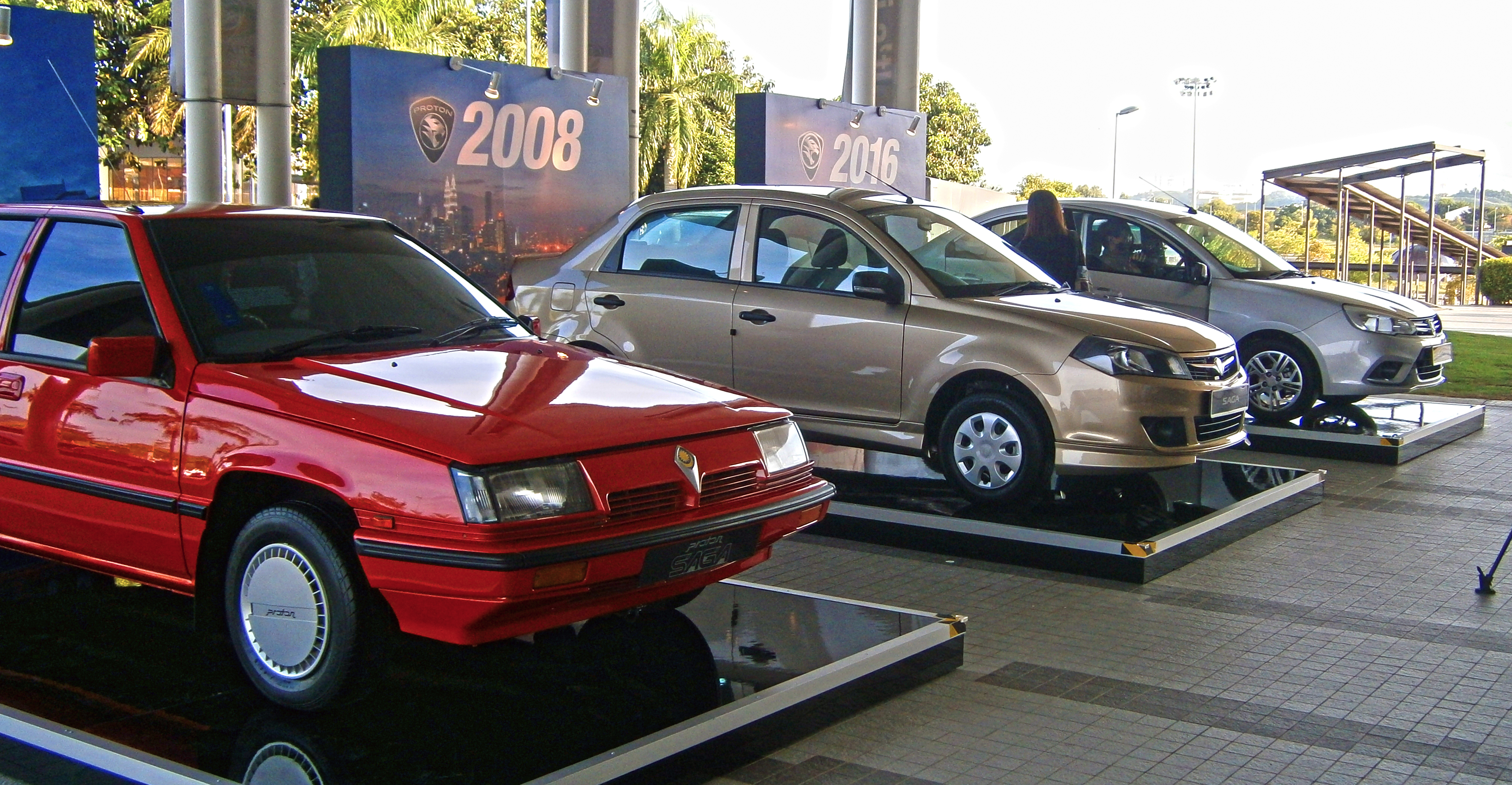
- The generations of the Proton Saga

Overview
- Manufacturer: Proton
- Production: 1985–present
- Assembly: Malaysia: Shah Alam, Selangor (Proton Hicom Factory); Bangladesh: Chittagong (PHP Automoblies); Pakistan: Karachi (Al Haj Automotive Private limited)

The Proton Saga is a series of subcompact cars and currently city cars produced by Malaysian automobile manufacturer Proton. Introduced in 1985, the Proton Saga became the first Malaysian car and a major milestone in the Malaysian automotive industry. The Saga is Proton's longest-running and best-selling nameplate, with over 2.2 million units sold worldwide over 41 years (1985 to 2026).

The first generation Saga was developed as the result of a joint venture between HICOM and Mitsubishi Motors. It is based on the second generation Mitsubishi Lancer Fiore, and was available in 4-door saloon and 5-door hatchback guises. The second generation Proton Saga was unveiled on 18 January 2008. It is based on a stretched Proton Savvy platform and was developed in-house by Proton. The third generation Proton Saga was launched on 28 September 2016. It is based on the outgoing Saga FLX platform, and is powered by the Iriz's 1.3-litre VVT engine. An updated Proton Saga was launched on 27 November 2025 based on Advanced Modular Architecture (AMA) platform, and powered by 1.5-litre Intelligent Green Technology (i-GT) inline-four engine.

The name 'Saga' is an acronym for 'Safety, Achievement, Greatness, and Ability'. In Malay, 'Saga' refers to the hard red seed (abrus precatorius) of the Saga tree. The Proton Saga is also a well-known national symbol of Malaysia.

== First generation (C21A, C22A; 1985) ==
=== Proton Saga (1985–1992) ===
Proton Saga (C20, Mk1)
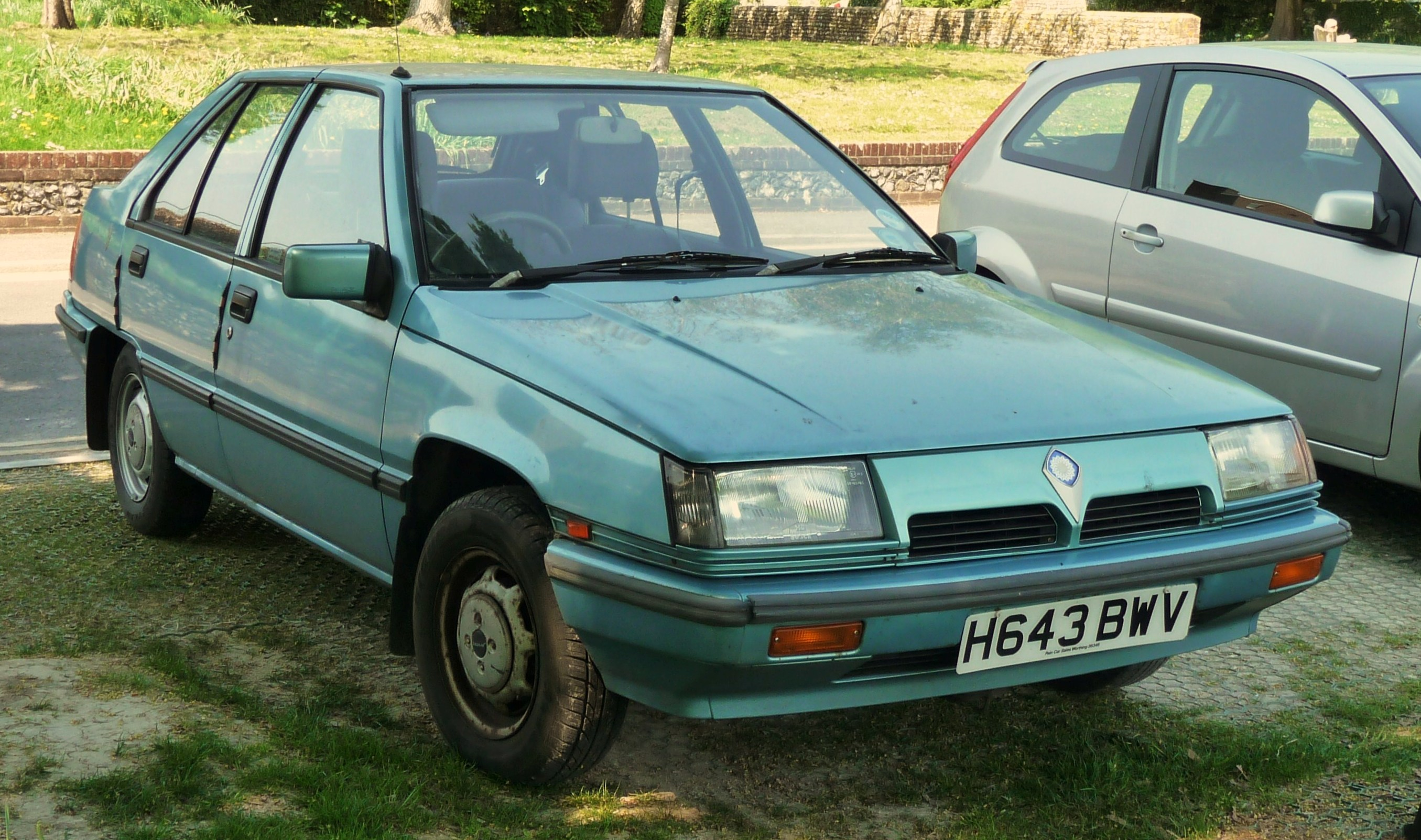

Overview
- Production: 1985–1992

Body and chassis
- Class: B-segment
- Body style: 4-door saloon 5-door hatchback
- Layout: FF layout

Powertrain
- Engine: 1.3 L 4G13 Orion II I4; 1.3 L 4G13 Magma I4; 1.3 L 4G13P Megavalve 12V I4; 1.5 L 4G15 Orion II I4; 1.5 L 4G15 Magma I4; 1.5 L 4G15P Megavalve 12V I4
- Transmission: 5-speed manual 3-speed automatic

The Proton Saga saloon was launched on 9 July 1985. It is based on the second generation Mitsubishi Lancer Fiore platform, and powered by the 1.3-litre 4G13 Orion II engine. In January 1987, Proton introduced the 1.5-litre 4G15-powered Saga saloon.

The Proton Saga Magma was introduced in mid-1987, offering mild mechanical and cosmetic upgrades. A new hatchback variant called the Proton Saga Aeroback was launched in October 1987.

On 16 March 1989, Proton launched the Saga in the United Kingdom. The saloon models were renamed Proton 1.3 and Proton 1.5, while the hatchback versions featured additional 'Aeroback' badging. Proton advertised their models with the slogan "Japanese Technology, Malaysian Style". Proton later set the record for the 'Fastest selling make of new car ever to enter the United Kingdom', exceeding their 12-month sales target within 6 months. The Saga was aimed squarely at the value end of the market, and not only took sales away from the established Eastern European marques such as Lada and Skoda, but also attracted customers who traditionally bought Japanese, as brands such as Nissan and Toyota had moved up-market to compete with European offerings.

In August 1990, the Proton Saga Megavalve was launched in Malaysia. It was fitted with a more powerful 12-valve engine, and the exterior design was altered slightly with a new grille, trim and rims along with the inclusion of rear seat belts and a third brake light as standard. Proton launched the Saga Megavalve in the United Kingdom in January 1991, where it was renamed Proton 12-Valve.

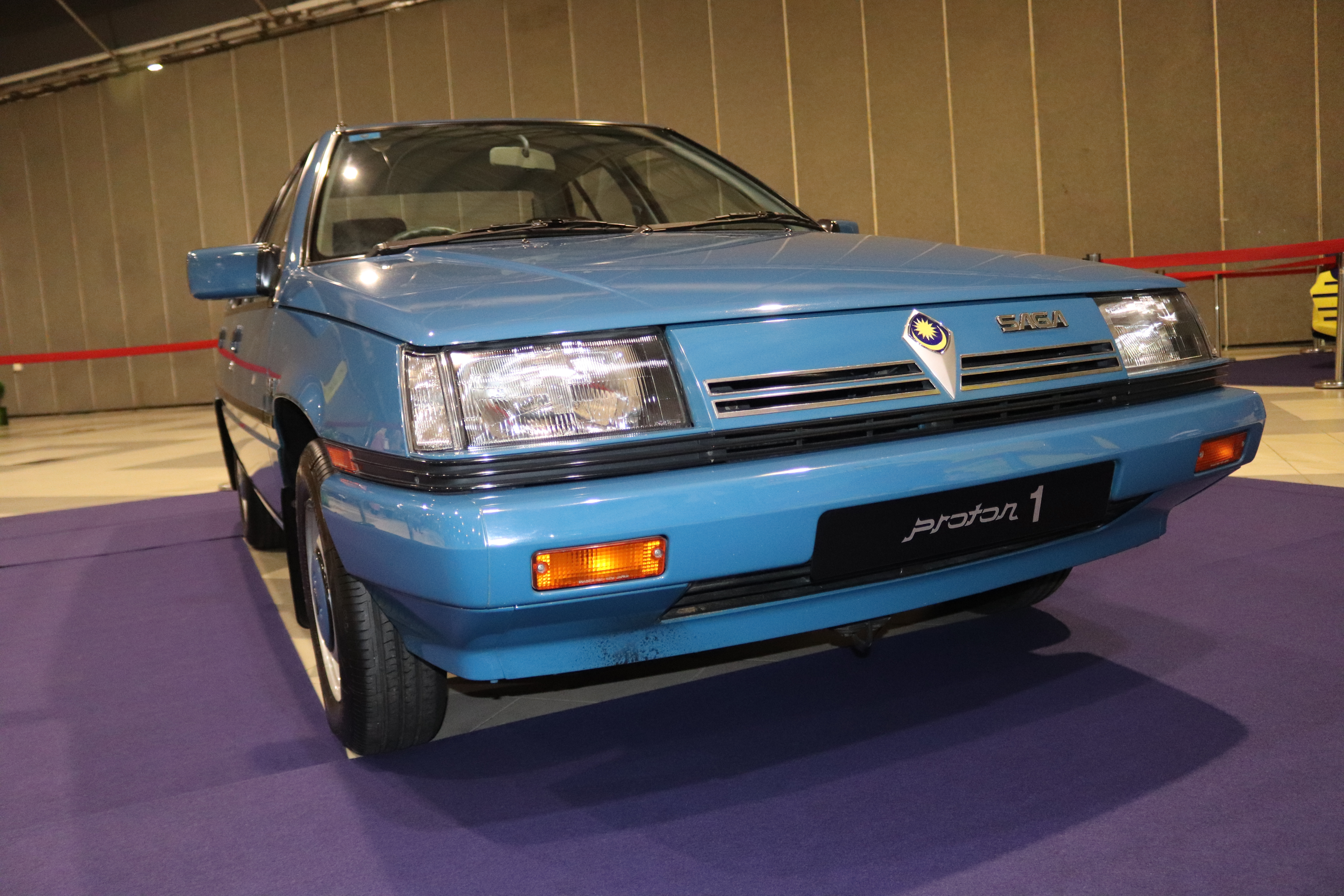
1985 Proton Saga (Orion) with "PROTON 1" registration plate

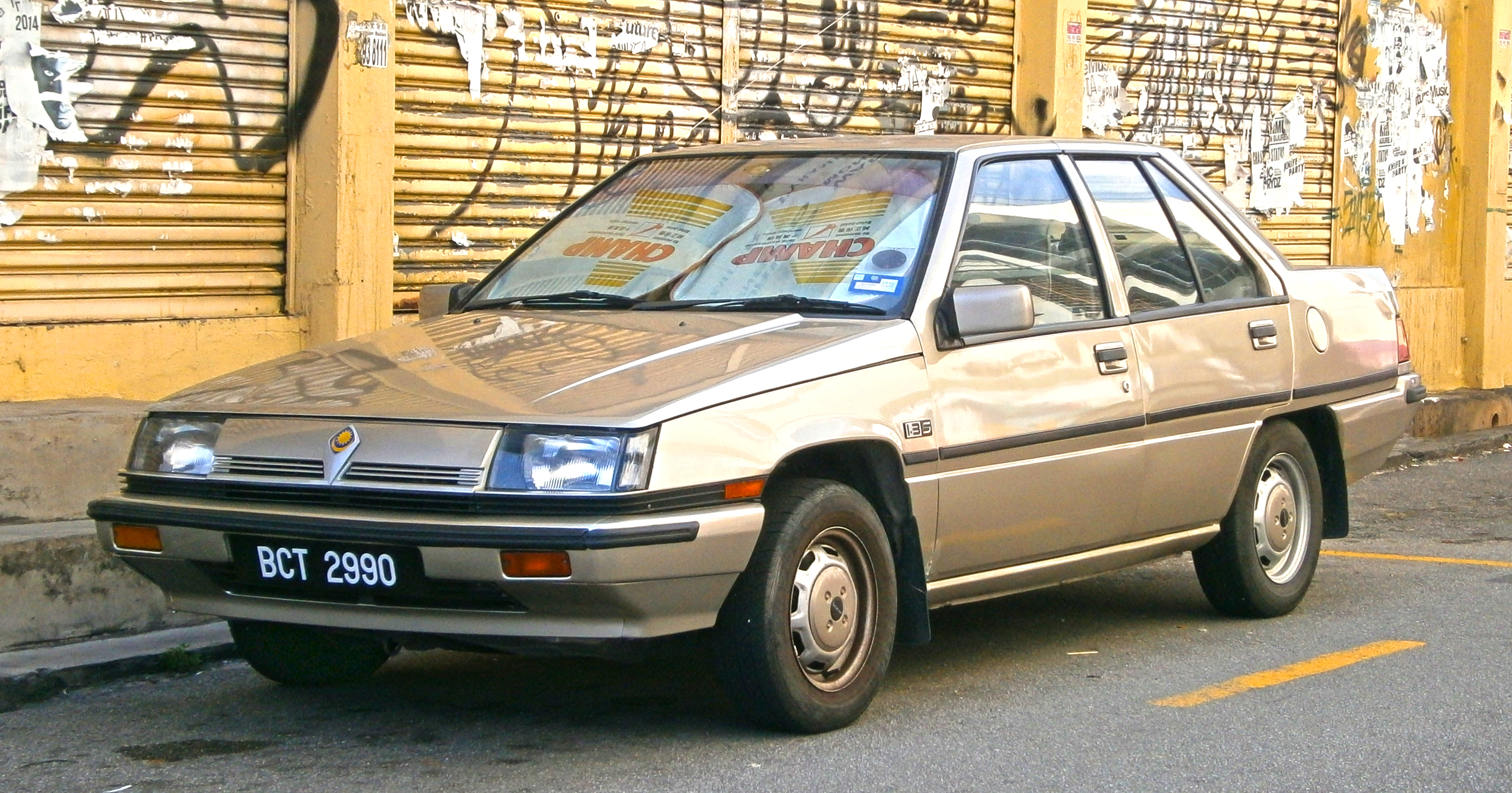
1987–1990 Proton Saga (Magma) saloon

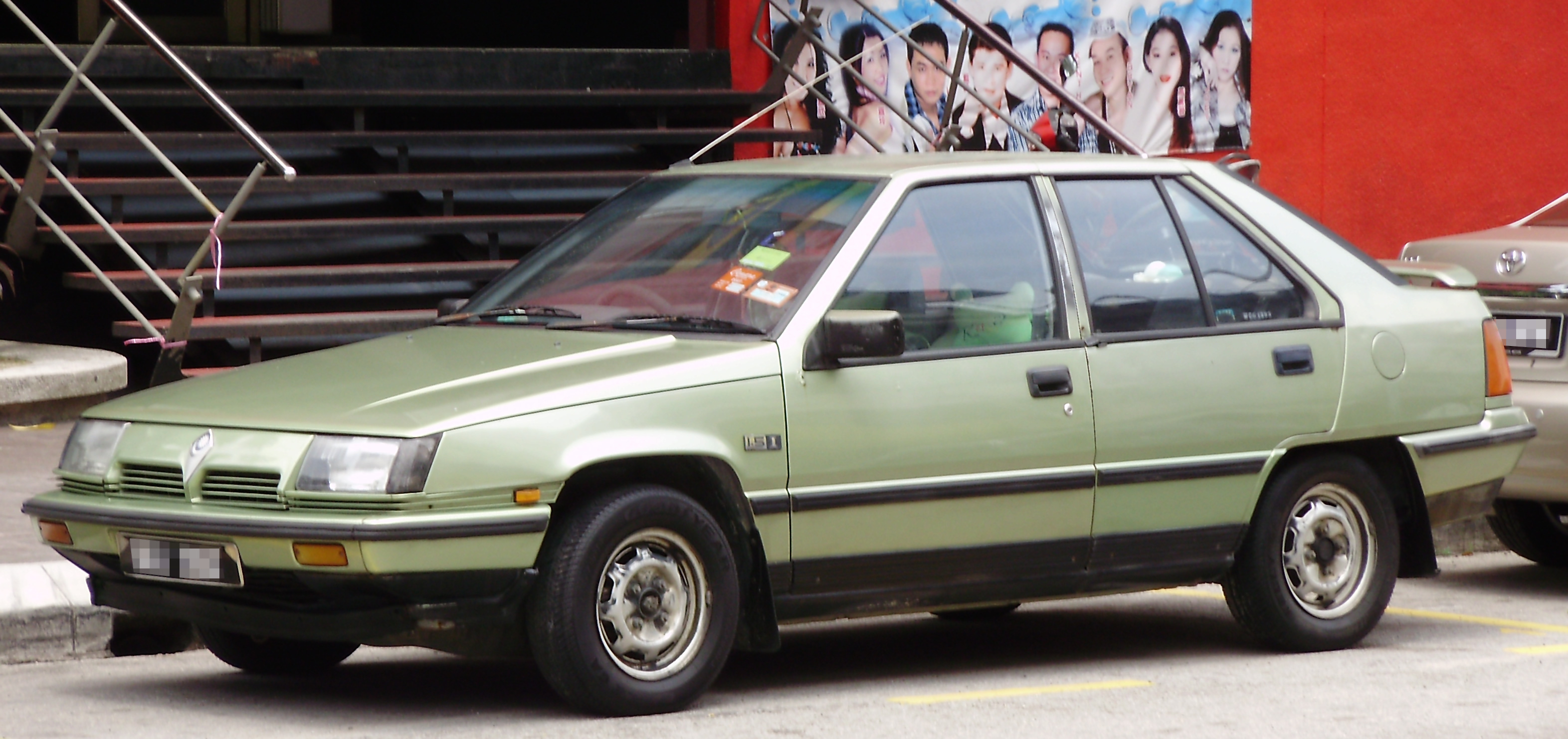
1990–1992 Proton Saga (Megavalve) Aeroback hatchback

=== Proton Saga Iswara (1992–2003) ===
Proton Saga Iswara (C20, Mk2)
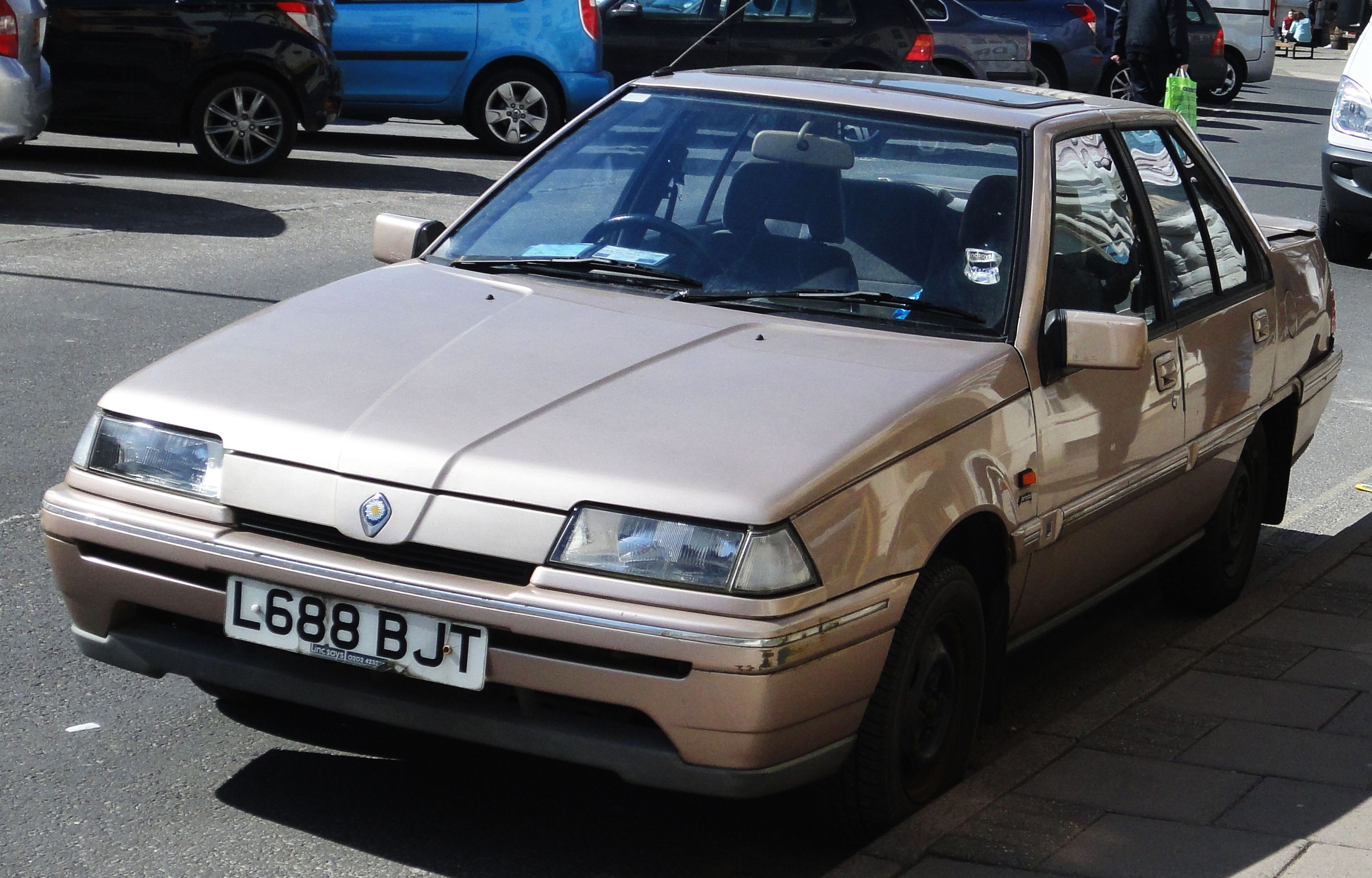

Overview
- Production: 1992–2003

Body and chassis
- Class: B-segment
- Body style: 4-door saloon 5-door hatchback

Powertrain
- Engine: 1.3 L 4G13P 12V I4; 1.5 L 4G15P 12V I4
- Transmission: 5-speed manual 3-speed automatic

On 15 August 1992, the Proton Saga Iswara (also known as the Proton Mpi or Proton Iswara in the United Kingdom) was launched. It was named after the great Helen butterfly (Papilio iswara) of Sarawak. It shared the platform found in the previous iteration, but received major exterior and interior changes. The Saga Iswara was available in four-door saloon and five-door hatchback guises and continued to be equipped with the 12-valve Mitsubishi Orion 1.3L and 1.5L engines. The saloon version of the Saga Iswara became Malaysia's preferred choice of taxi.

It continued to be exported to Europe until 1996, having been sold alongside the Persona (Wira) there since 1993.

In 2001, Proton introduced the Iswara Aeroback Special Edition. It was based on the Saga Iswara hatchback but included large exterior cosmetic changes and minor interior alterations. It was only available in silver, with manual transmission and the 1.3 litre 4G13 engine.

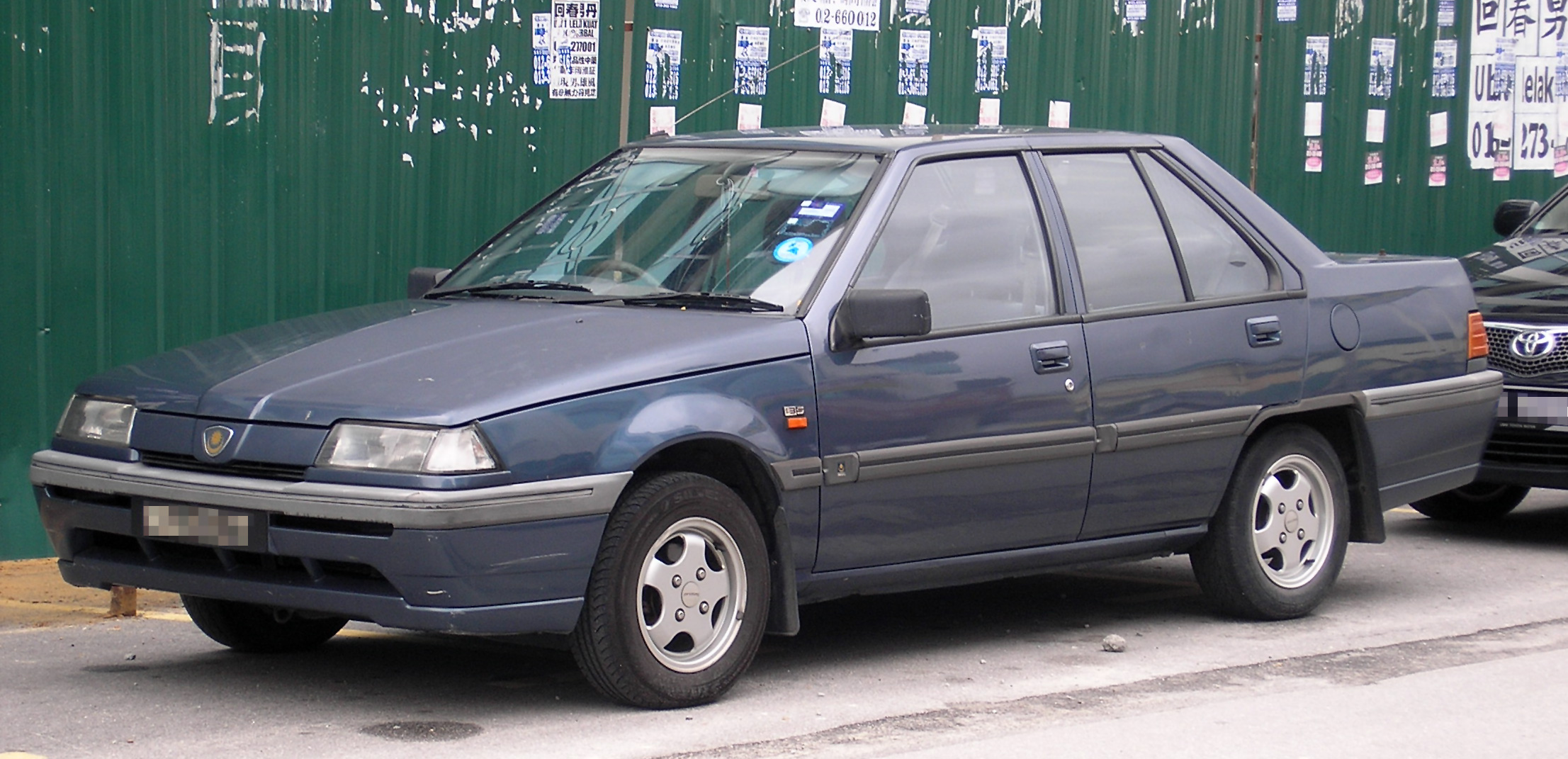
1992–2001 Proton Saga Iswara saloon

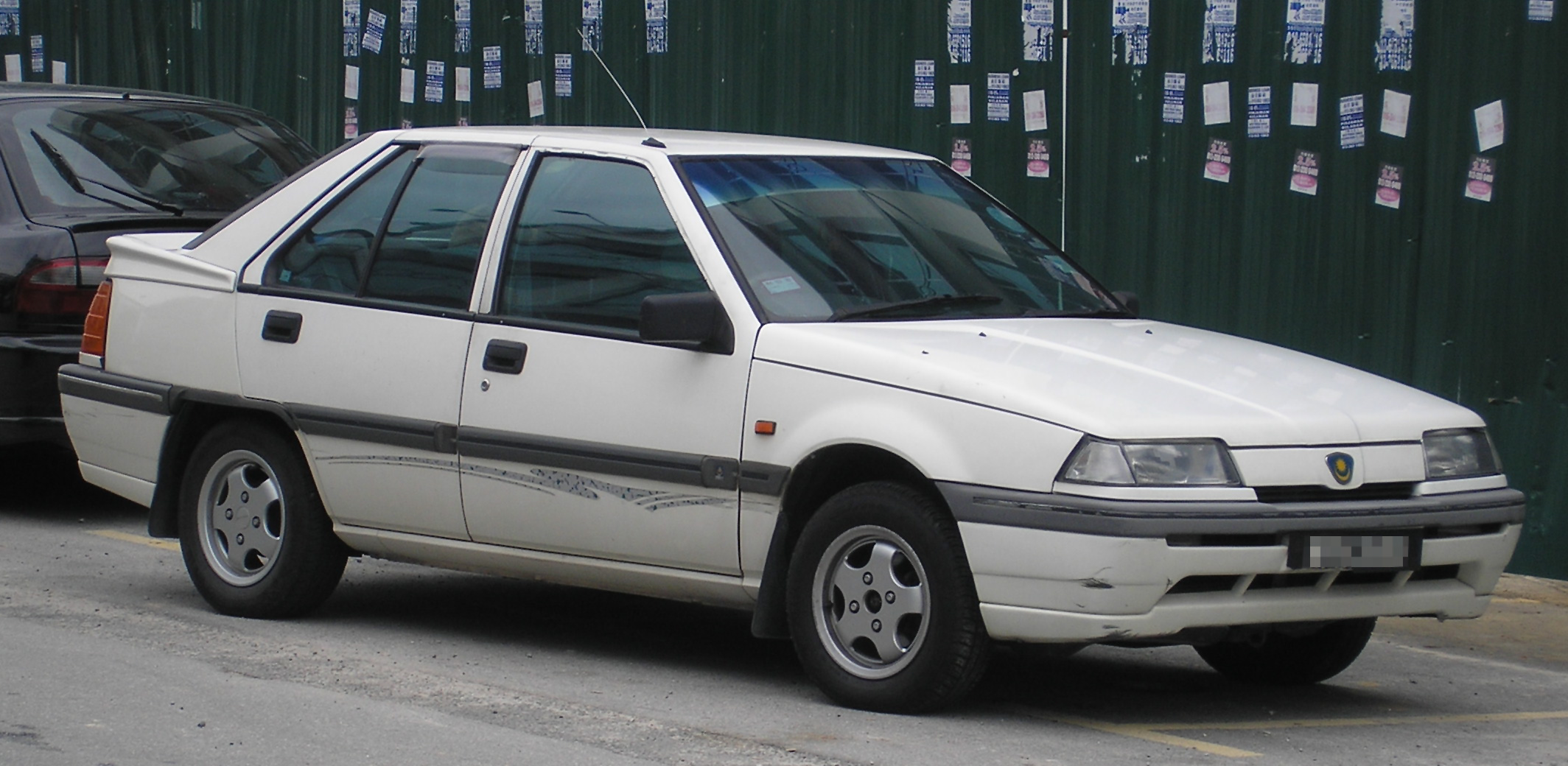
1992–2001 Proton Saga Iswara Aeroback hatchback

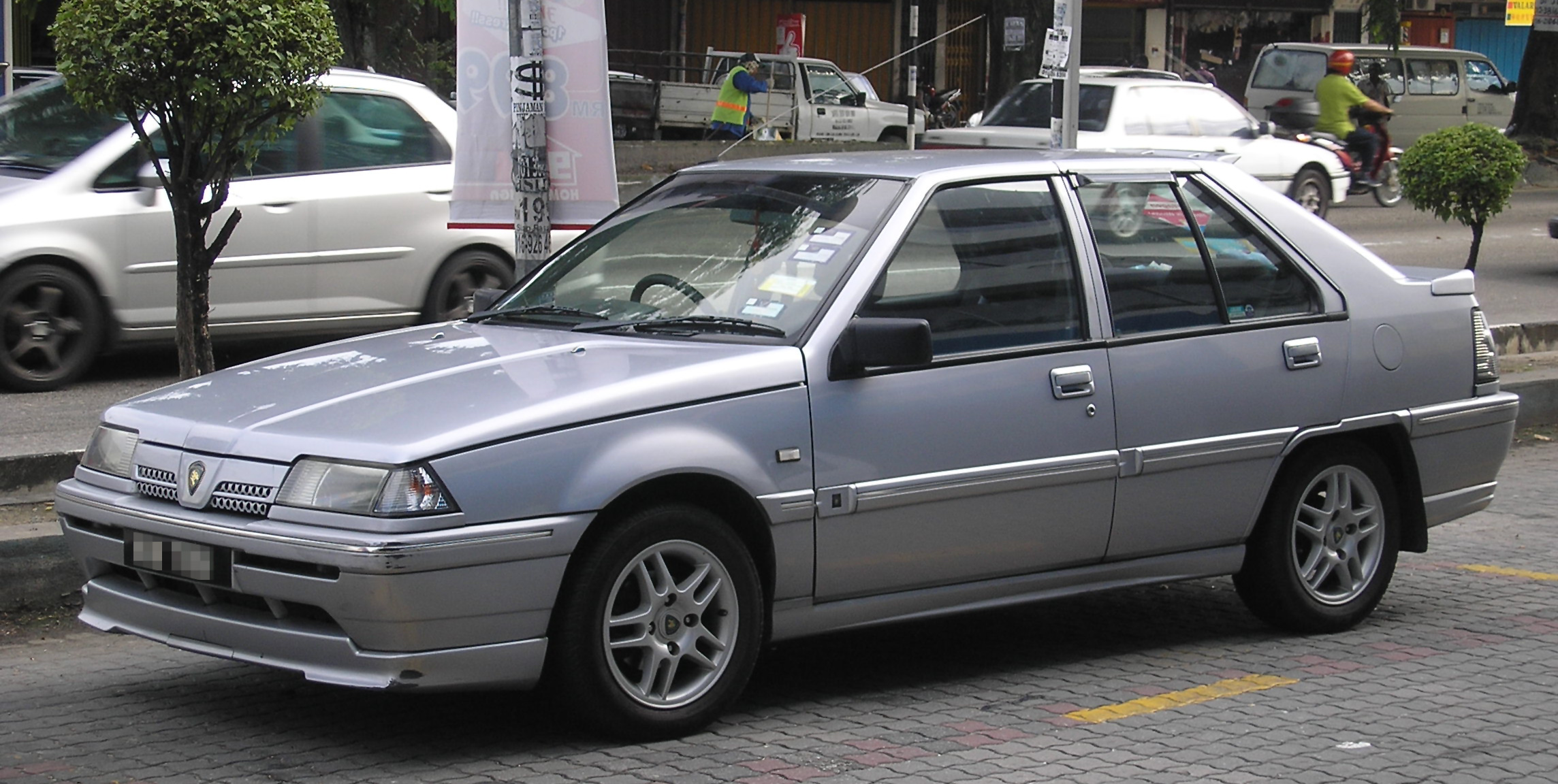
2001–2003 Proton Iswara Aeroback Special Edition hatchback

=== Proton Saga LMST (2003–2008) ===
Proton Saga LMST (C20, Mk3)
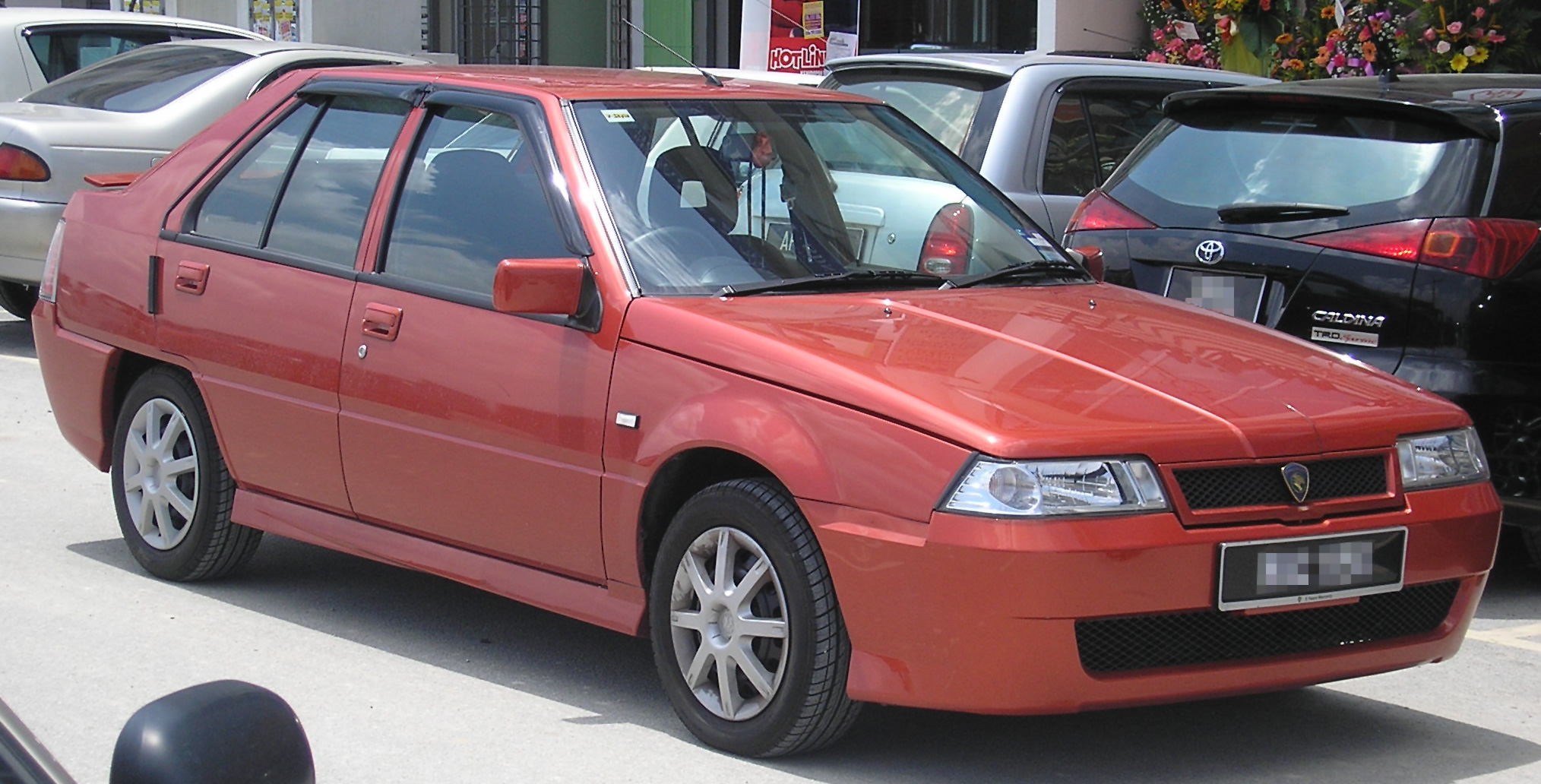

Overview
- Production: 2003 – early 2008

Body and chassis
- Class: B-segment
- Body style: 5-door hatchback
- Layout: FF layout

Powertrain
- Engine: 1.3 L 4G13P 12V I4
- Transmission: 5-speed manual

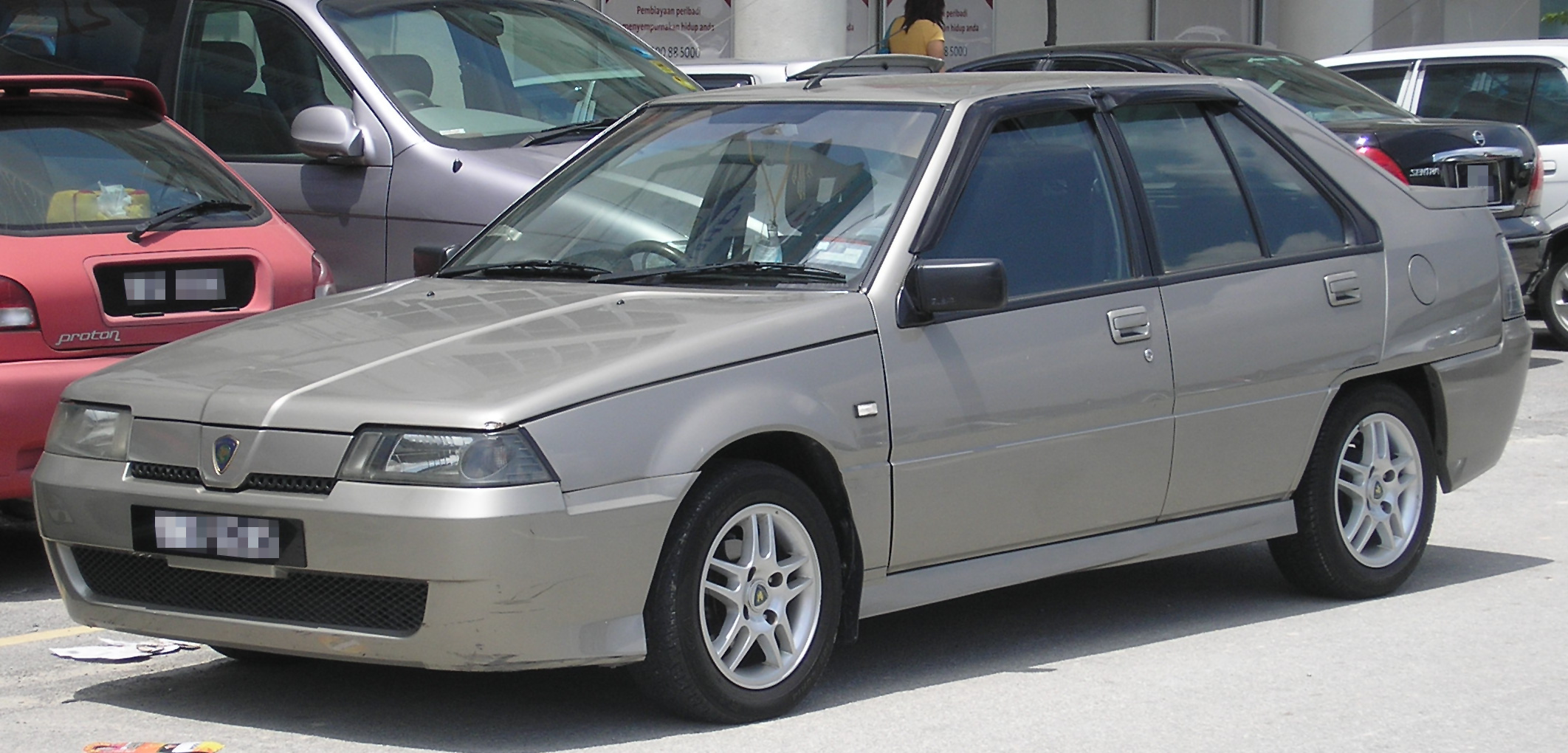
2003–2006 Proton Saga LMST hatchback

The Proton Saga LMST hatchback was launched in 2003. It was based on the same platform found in the previous models. Nonetheless, it featured a modernized interior and major exterior modifications and improvements. The carburetted 1.3-litre Mitsubishi 4G13 engine was tuned to produce 83 PS (61 kW). It was only available in two trim lines, limited to the 5-speed manual transmission.

The LMST is not equipped with airbags or ABS, and was sold in four colours; red, dark blue, grey and black.

Proton redesigned the exterior as well as the interior of the Saga LMST in favour of sportiness over practicality. The glove compartment is of the open-type, offering less storage space and the muffler produced more noise without any real gain in power. As a result, the Saga LMST became less appealing to the general population and sales plummeted significantly.

In late 2006, Proton updated the Saga LMST, offering mainly cosmetic exterior changes. It was only available in three colours, Black, Sunrise Orange and Silver, and was limited to the 4G13 1.3L engine, mated to a 5-speed manual transmission. Unlike the Black and Sunrise Orange colour, the Silver colour has non-power steering, manual wind-up windows, 13-inch steel rims and hubcaps, a cassette player instead of the CD player, no air conditioning, driver’s door mirror only, no rear brakes, no tachometer, no rear seatbelts, which is found on the Black and Sunrise Orange variants and the exhaust manifold from the 2003 Saga LMST instead. Proton introduced the Saga LMST, along with Wira, GEN•2 and Impian (Also known as Waja in Southeast Asian markets) to Pakistan on 15 September 2006.

On 4 March 2007, Proton launched the final facelift model of the first generation Proton Saga, the Proton Saga LMST 50th Merdeka Anniversary Edition. It was largely identical to the 2006 Saga LMST, but was sold at a discount price of RM26,999 as opposed to the former RM33,240 price. The promotion was made in view of Malaysia's 50th Merdeka celebrations and as a symbol of Proton's gratitude to their customers. That year, the Proton Saga became the second best selling car behind the Perodua MyVi.

=== Awards and accolades ===
- Best Value Car of the Year (Proton Saga 1.5E Aeroback) - What Car? 1991
- Best Value Popular New Cars - Auto Express 1992
- Best Buy Family Car up to £10,000 - What Car? 1993

== Second generation (BT3, BT6; 2008) ==
=== Proton Saga (2008–2010) ===
Proton Saga (BT, Mk1)
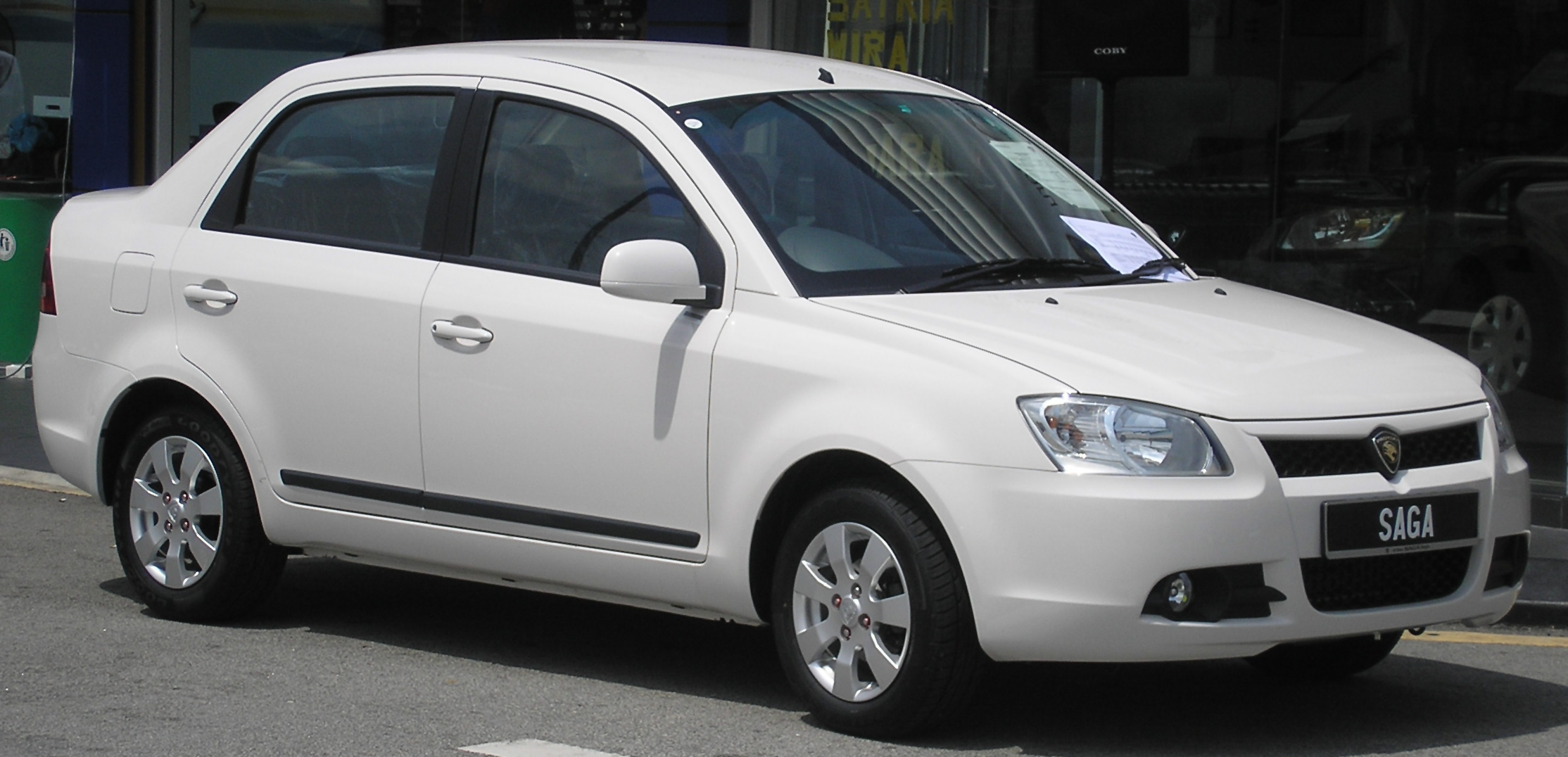

Overview
- Production: 2008–2010

Body and chassis
- Class: B-segment
- Body style: 4-door saloon
- Layout: FF layout

Powertrain
- Engine: 1.3L CamPro IAFM DOHC I4; 1.6L CamPro IAFM DOHC I4
- Transmission: 5-speed manual 4-speed automatic

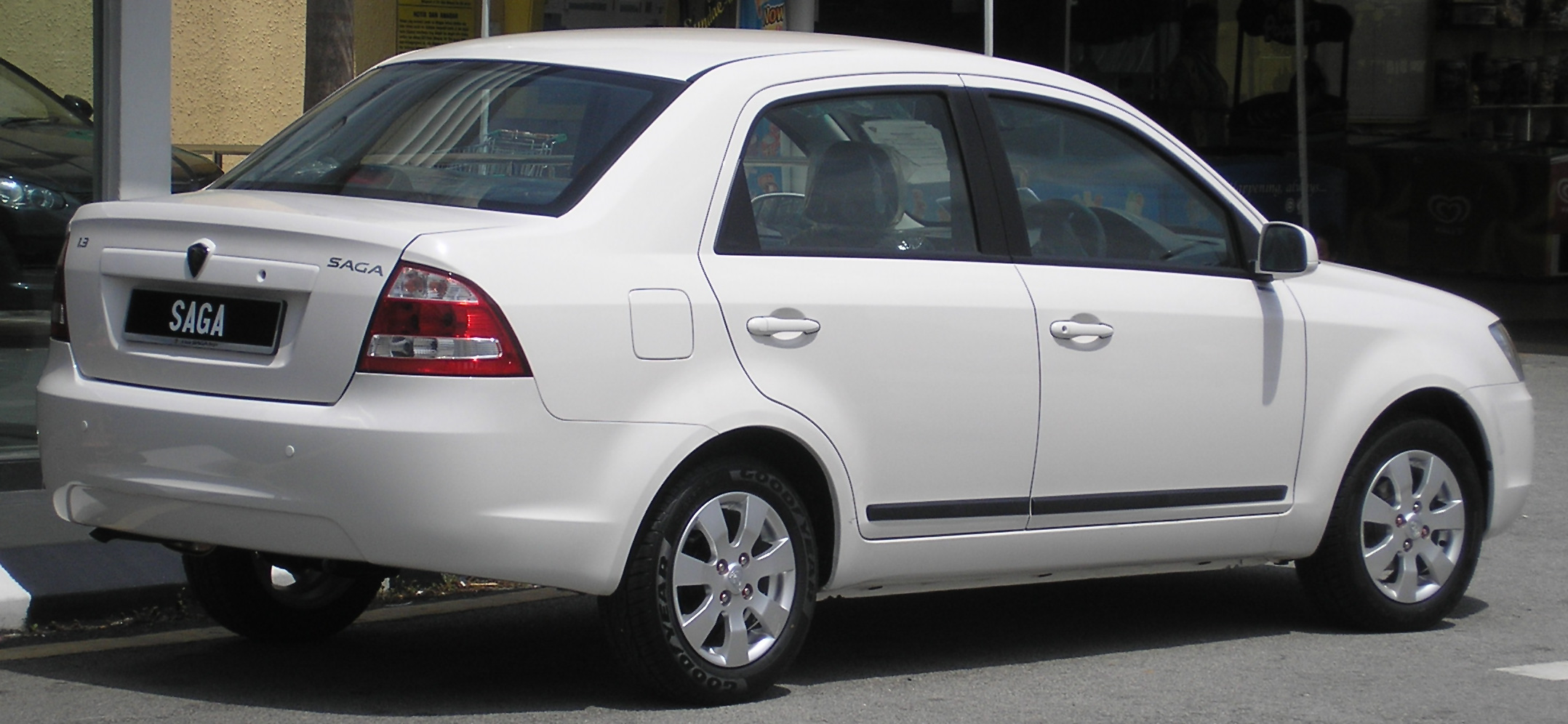
2008–2010 Proton Saga

The second generation Proton Saga, also called the Saga BLM (Base Line Model) launched on 18 January 2008. It was indigenously designed unlike the first generation and launched with 3 variants which were priced between RM31,498 and RM39,998 respectively. All variants were powered by Proton's 1.3 litre CamPro IAFM engine. The new Saga was a great sales success for Proton, having received over 23,000 bookings in less than two weeks since launch. It also replaced the older Saga Iswara as Malaysia's taxi of choice from 2008 to 2010. The taxi variants were equipped with 1.6 litre 110 bhp CamPro engines and were later converted to natural gas vehicles.

The Proton Saga SE was unveiled in July 2009. It was sold as a premium variant with just two colour options and a unique body kit, mated to the CamPro 1.3 engine found in the other models. In that same month, Proton showcased the emission-free Saga EV Concept at Universiti Putra Malaysia in Serdang. Powered by a 125 kW (168 hp) DC motor mated to a 5-speed manual transmission, it had a maximum range of 109 kilometres (68 miles) and could be charged over a standard household outlet. On 24 December 2009, Proton launched the S16 in the Australian market. The S16 was identical to the Saga, but featured the more powerful 110 bhp CamPro 1.6 engine. At the time, it retailed for AUD$11,990, making it the cheapest new car in Australia.

=== Proton Saga FL (2010–2012) ===
Proton Saga FL (BT, Mk2)
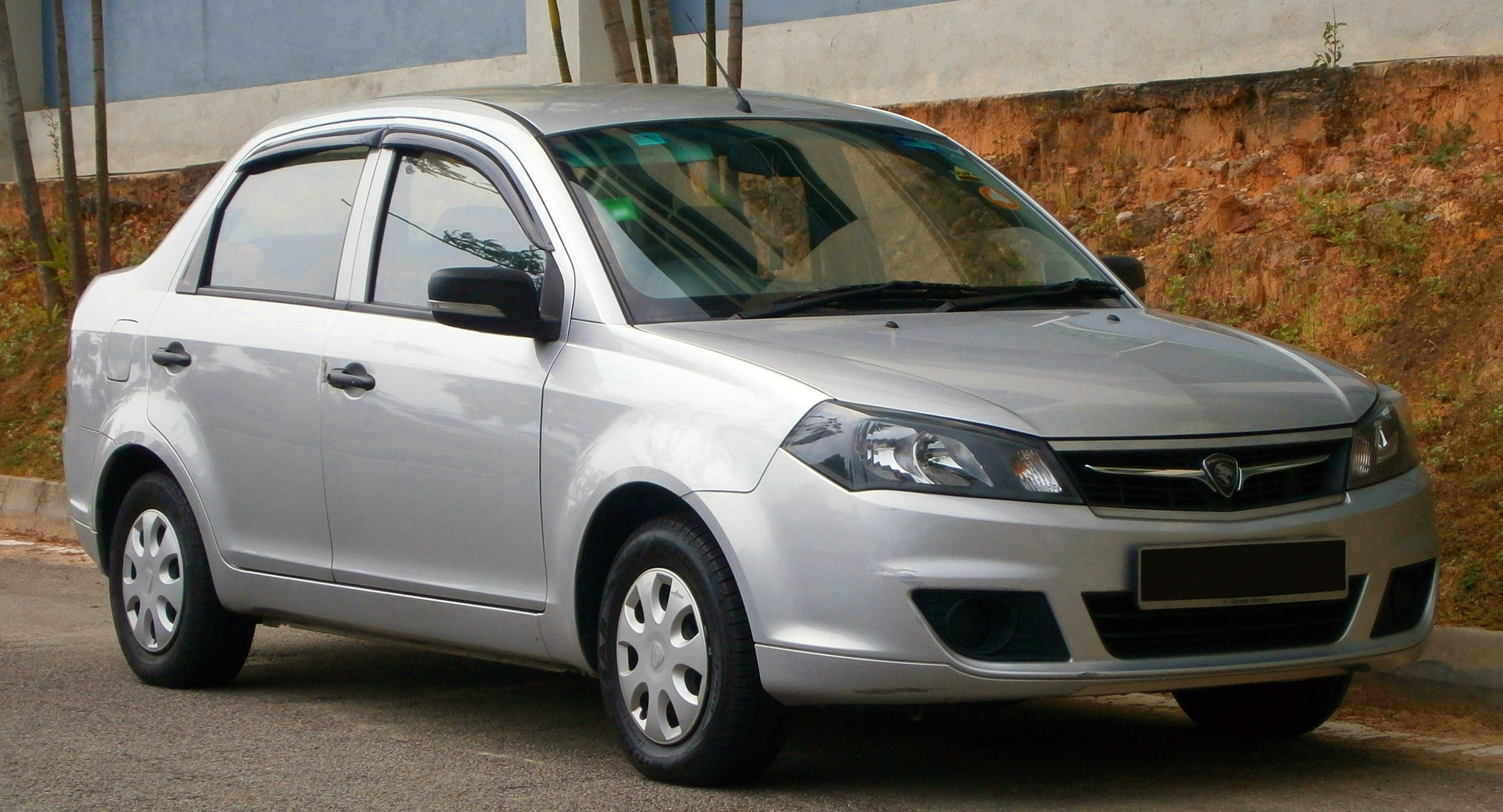

Overview
- Production: 2010–2012

Body and chassis
- Class: B-segment
- Body style: 4-door saloon
- Layout: FF layout

Powertrain
- Engine: 1.3L CamPro IAFM DOHC I4; 1.6L CamPro IAFM DOHC I4
- Transmission: 5-speed manual 4-speed automatic

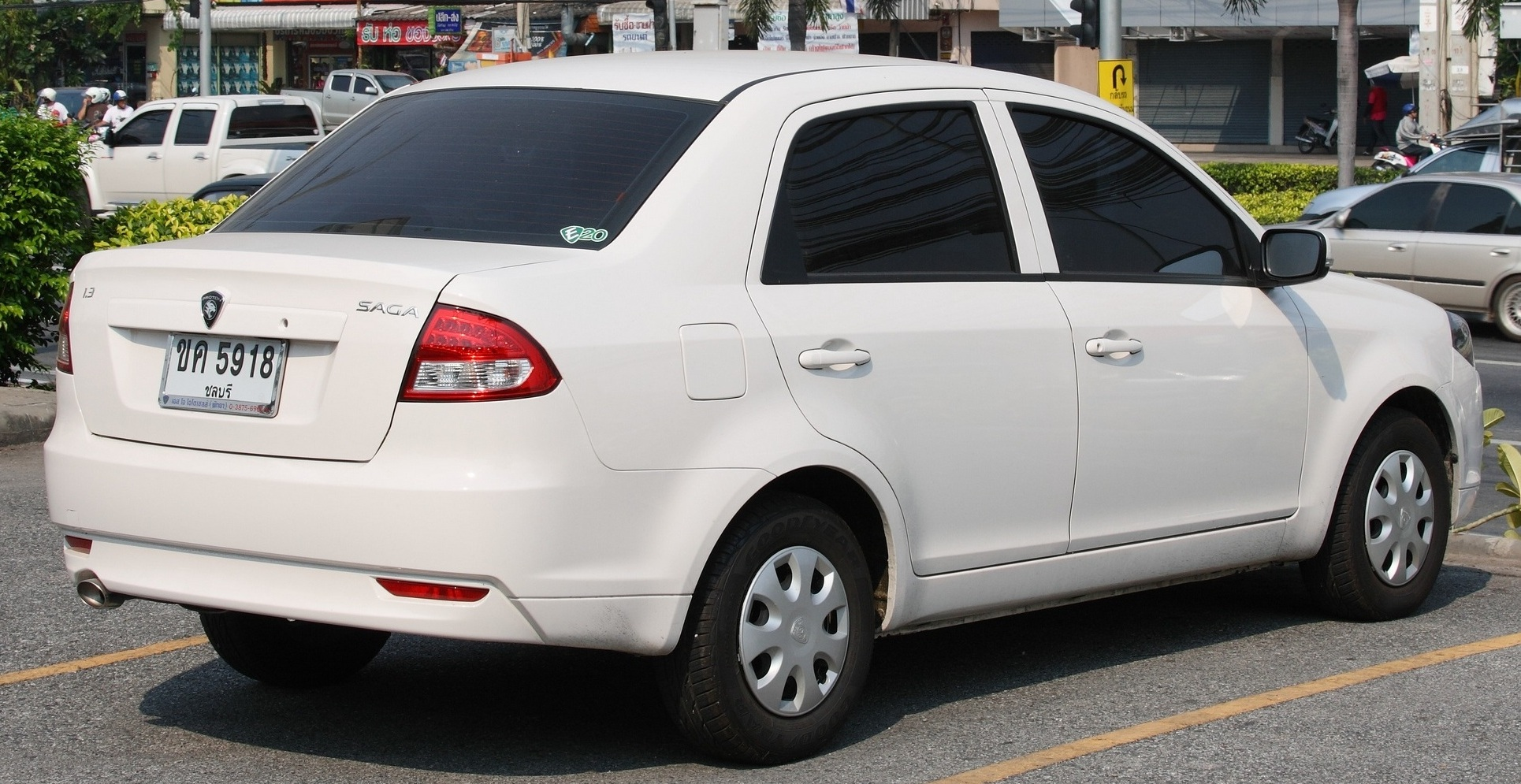
2010–2011 Proton Saga FL

On 30 November 2010, Proton unveiled the facelifted Proton Saga FL at the Thai International Motor Expo 2010. It received large exterior updates, but the technical specifications and interior remain mostly unchanged from the pre-facelift Saga.

The Saga FL was launched in Malaysia two weeks after it was unveiled in Thailand. It was sold in two trim lines and both were available with 4-speed automatic and 5-speed manual transmissions. Every Proton Saga FL came standard with 4 power windows. Later in May 2011, a more powerful model called the Proton Saga FL 1.6 Executive was launched.

=== Proton Saga FLX (2011–2016) ===
Proton Saga FLX (BT, Mk3)
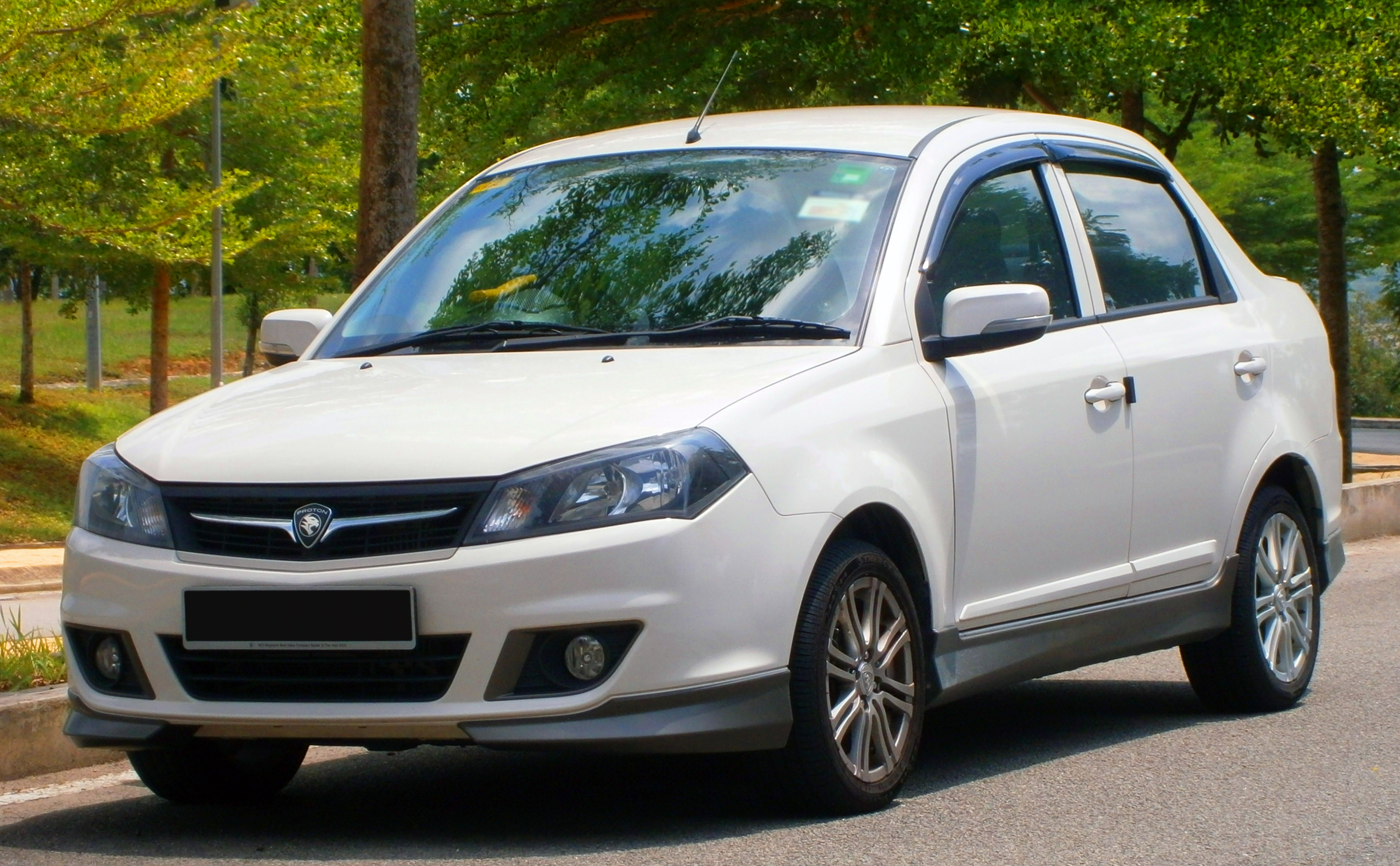

Overview
- Production: 2011–2016

Body and chassis
- Class: B-segment
- Body style: 4-door saloon

Powertrain
- Engine: 1.3L CamPro IAFM+ DOHC I4; 1.6L CamPro IAFM+ DOHC I4
- Transmission: 5-speed manual CVT automatic

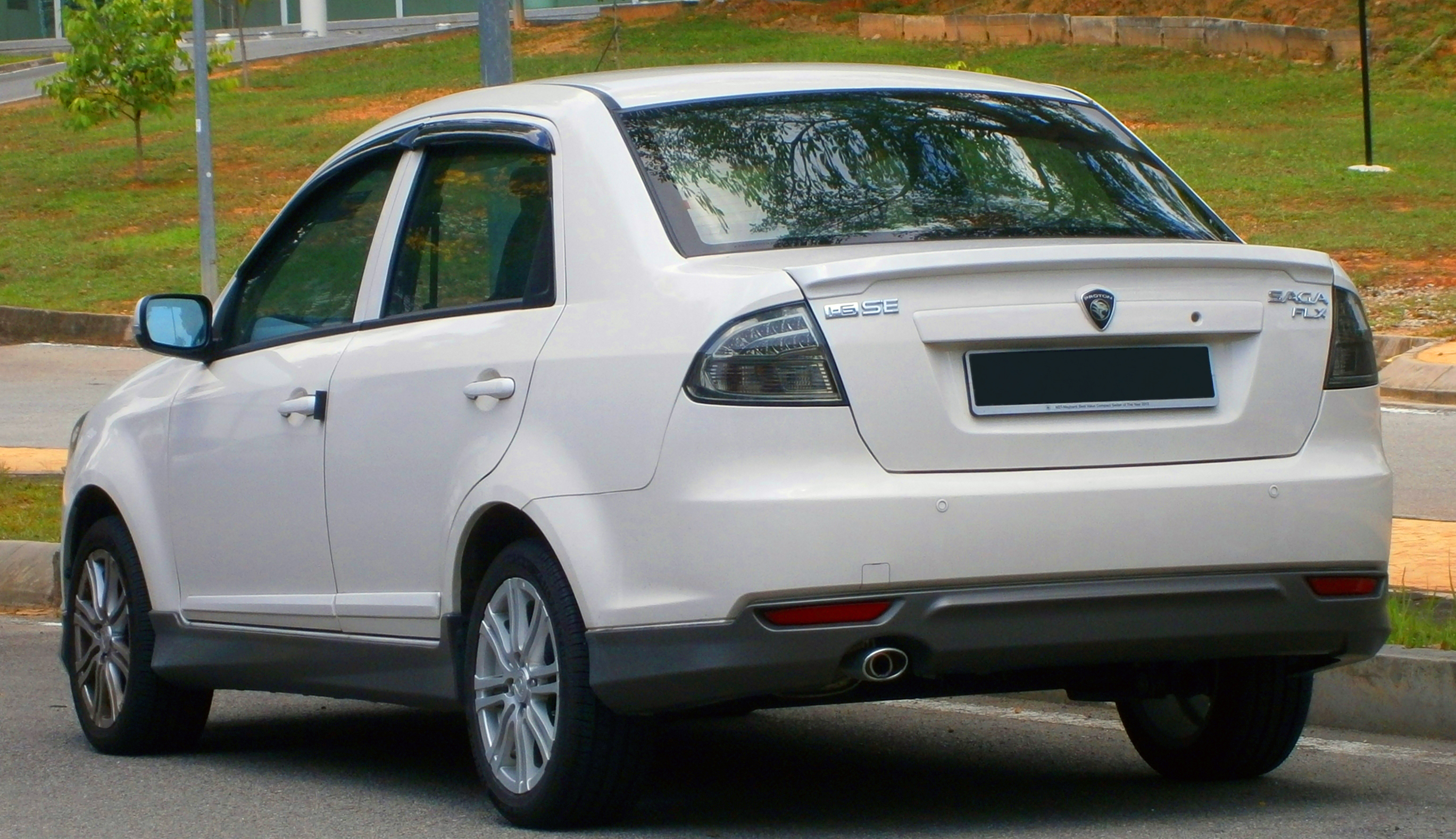
2011–2015 Proton Saga FLX SE

Eight months after the launch of the Saga FL, Proton added to its line-up the Saga FLX in which 'X' stands for extra. The FLX is available in two trim lines which can be mated to a choice of either manual or continuously variable transmission (CVT) drivetrains. The fine-tuned CamPro IAFM+ engine is utilized and there are options for dual airbags and anti lock braking (ABS) with electronic brakeforce distribution (EBD). The handling has been vastly improved with a new suspension setup which strikes a balance between ride comfort and handling performance. The exterior of the Saga FLX is identical to the Saga FL.

The Proton Saga FLX SE was launched on 30 November 2011. It is powered by a 108 hp CamPro IAFM+ 1.6 litre engine, paired to a CVT. Driver and passenger airbags as well as ABS with EBD are standard. The FLX SE is equipped with sportier kit and is only available in two colours, white and red.

The Saga FLX entered the Australian market in June 2012, where it was renamed the S16 FLX. It replaces the old S16 in Proton Australia's fleet. The S16 FLX comes in two variants, the GX and GXR, each with manual and CVT drivetrain options respectively, with dual airbags, ABS and EBD standard across the range.

On 15 June 2013, Proton introduced a new sub-variant of the Saga FLX, called the Saga SV. SV is an acronym for Super Value, with prices starting from just RM33,438 for the manual transmission variant. Despite the reduction in price, the Saga SV offers improved safety standards with dual airbags and a reinforced frame with only minimal exterior changes when compared to the Saga FLX Standard. The Saga Plus was produced in five colours, namely Tranquility Black, Fire Red, Genetic Silver, Solid White and Elegant Brown. Despite the added cosmetic upgrades, prices for the Saga Plus remained unchanged from the Saga SV, ranging from RM33,242 for the manual with solid paint to RM36,577 for the CVT with metallic paint, all of which were on-the-road prices with insurance. A three-year or 100,000 km warranty was also offered.

=== Awards and accolades ===
- Best Compact / People's car of the Year – Asian Auto-VCA Auto Industry Awards 2008
- Entry Level Category Winner – NST / Maybank COTY Awards 2008
- Best Model of the Year (Malaysia) – Frost & Sullivan Asia Pacific 2009 Automotive Awards
- Best Passenger Car Model of the Year – Frost & Sullivan Malaysia Excellence Award 2010
- Best People's Car Award – Asian Auto–Auto Industry Awards 2011
- Best Value Compact Sedan of the Year (NST/Maybank COTY Awards 2012)
- Proton Saga SV awarded Debut Model of the Year during Frost & Sullivan Awards 2014

== Third generation (BT3; 2016) ==
Proton Saga (BT, Mk4)
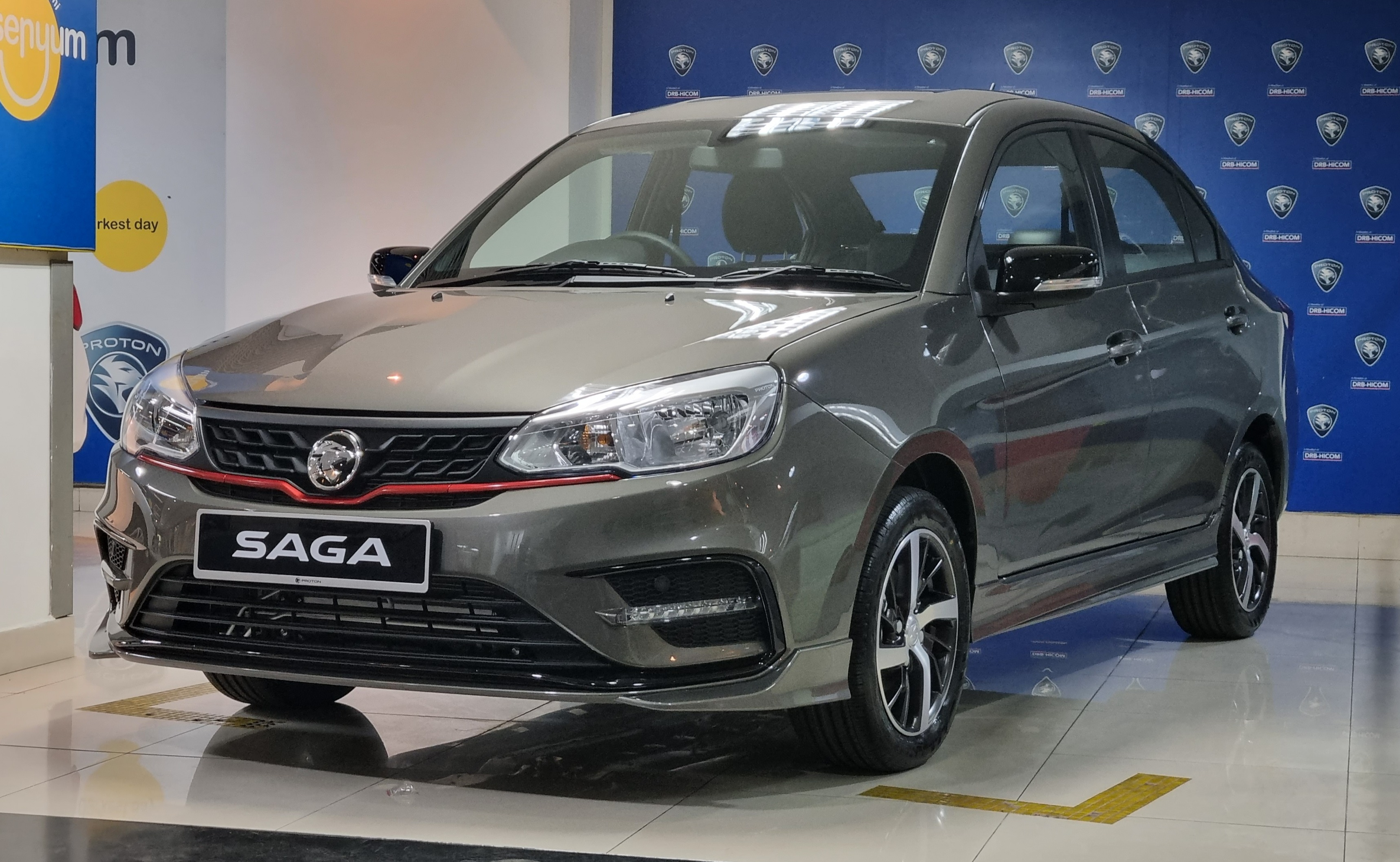

Overview
- Production: 2016−present

Body and chassis
- Class: A-segment
- Body style: 4-door saloon

Powertrain
- Engine: 1.3 L S4PE VVT DOHC I4 (2016−2025); 1.5L BHE15PFI DOHC I4 (2025-present)

The third generation Proton Saga, codenamed P2-13A is an A-segment saloon engineered by Malaysian automobile manufacturer Proton. It was launched on 28 September 2016 as the successor to the second generation Proton Saga.

The third generation Saga is based on the outgoing Saga FLX platform, and is powered by the Iriz's 1.3-litre VVT engine producing 94 PS (69 kW). Proton has completely re-engineered the exterior design of the new Saga. Its interior has been revamped and refined with an emphasis on noise, vibration, and harshness reduction.

The third generation Saga is positioned as Proton's entry-level sedan, below the larger B-segment Persona. Safety standards have been improved with the introduction of electronic stability control (ESC) and a 20% stronger body structure. ASEAN NCAP has awarded a 4-star safety rating for the new Saga.

On 6 August 2019, an updated Proton Saga was launched at the Malaysia International Trade and Exhibition Centre in Kuala Lumpur. It's considered as minor change internally but as a facelift to the general public. The car now includes design cues from the Proton X70, Proton Iriz and the Proton Persona which includes the new "infinite weave," a pattern inspired by batik and Malaysian wood carvings. The naturally aspirated DOHC VVT engine is no longer paired to a CVT made by Punch Powertrain, but a four-speed torque converter automatic gearbox sourced from Hyundai. The Executive variant was dropped with the range consisting of Standard MT, Standard AT and Premium AT. The 2019 Saga also saw the air conditioning vents moved down to allow space for 'floating' head units which included a head unit that runs a modified version of Android for the Premium variant. The Saga now starts at a lowered price of RM32,800 for the manual transmission variant and up to RM39,800 which is almost RM2,000 lower than the pre-facelift version.

On 9 July 2020, the Saga Anniversary Edition was launched to celebrate Proton's 35th year in the automotive industry. It featured optional skirts around the car, darkened alloy wheels and yellow accents in and out.

On 18 February 2021, the Saga R3 Limited Edition was launched alongside the Iriz R3 Limited Edition, Persona Black Edition and Exora Black Edition. It is limited to only 2,000 units. The looks are almost the same with the Anniversary edition with the exception of some R3 body stickers and windshield stickers.

On 12 May 2022, Proton launched yet another revision of the updated Proton Saga. This time, it gains a new variant called the Premium S and that gets new kit like a keyless entry and start system, automatic folding mirrors, a black and red theme inside and leatherette-wrapped steering and seats. The latter in a semi leatherette and fabric upholstery combo.

On 26 September 2025, production of third-generation Proton Saga ended at Shah Alam plant, with the last unit rolling off from the production line on the same day. Production of the facelift model was moved to Tanjong Malim.

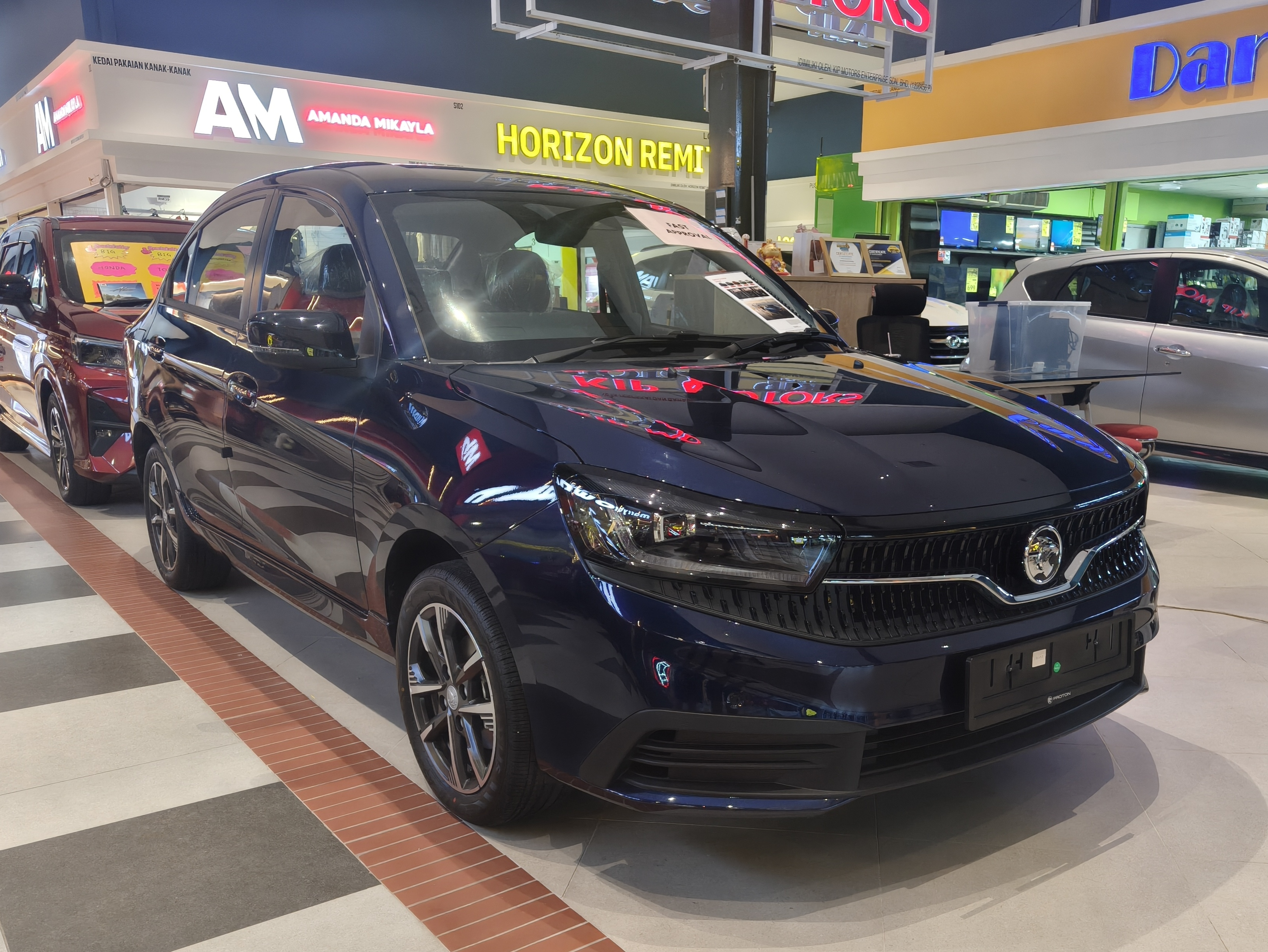
Front view

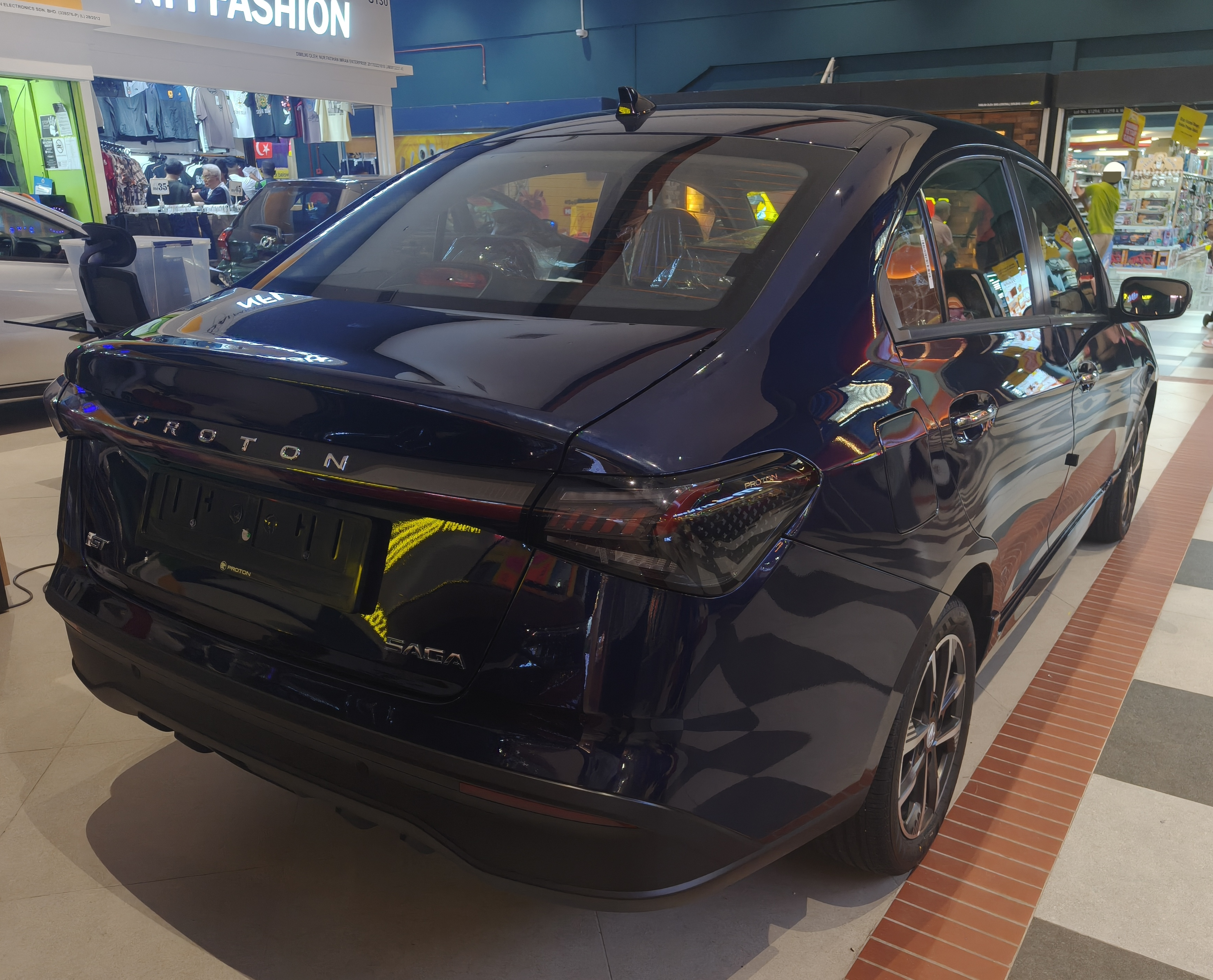
Rear view

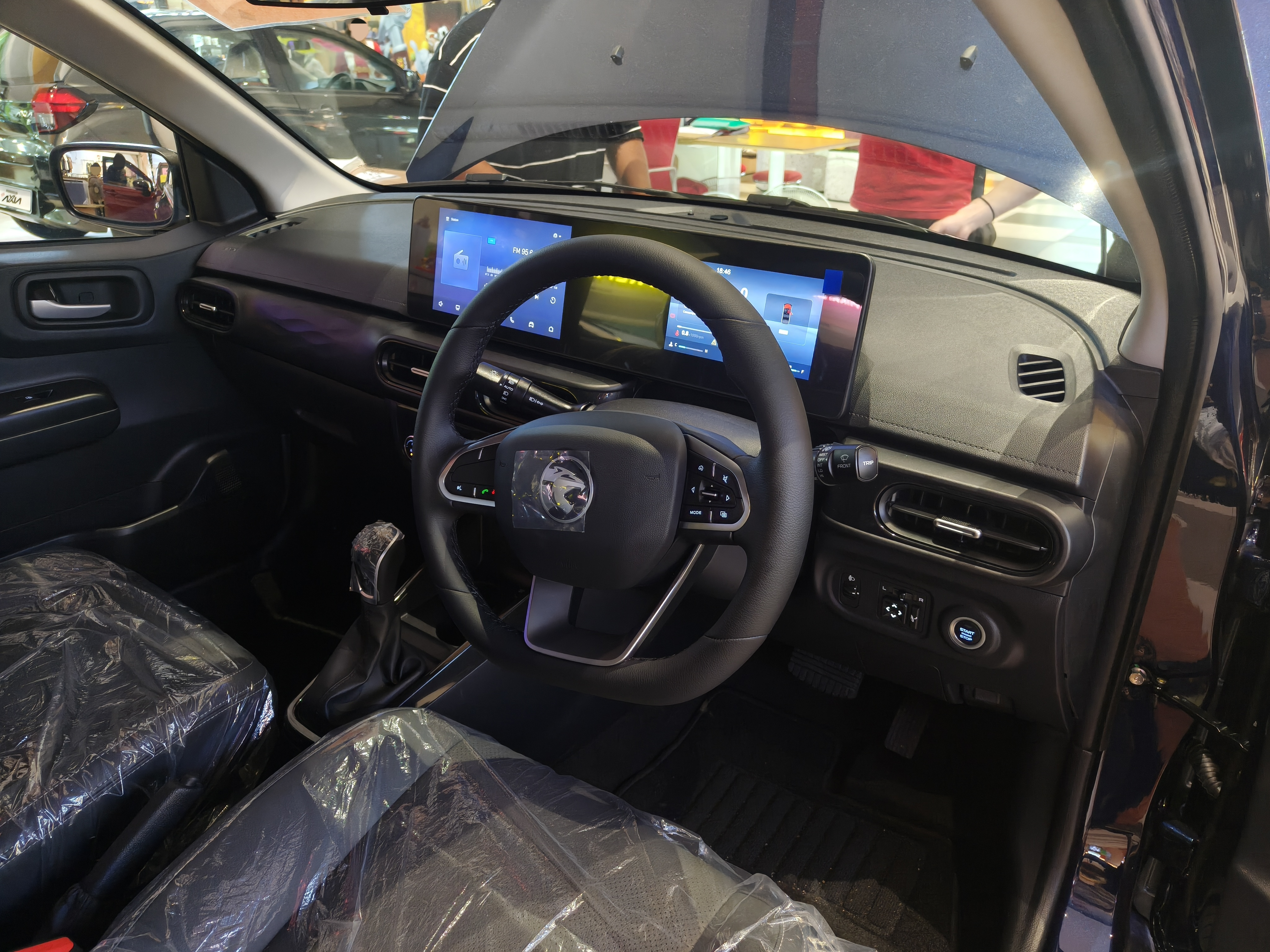
Interior

On 27 November 2025, Proton launched yet a heavily updated Proton Saga. It is the first model to be used in Advanced Modular Architecture (AMA) platform. Proton Saga MC3 was offered in three variants: Standard, Executive and Premium. For engines, all variants were powered by new BHE15PFI 1.5-litre petrol engine, with the Standard and Executive are paired with the Aisin-sourced 4-speed automatic while the Premium variant paired with the Punch Powertrain CVT.

=== Awards and accolades ===
- Rising Star Award Car - Asean NCAP Grand Prix Award 2016
- Value-For-Money Car - Malaysia Car of the Year 2016
- Compact Sedan of the Year - DSF.my Allianz Vehicle of the Year (VOTY) 2017)
- Best 3 City Cars of Malaysia‍‍‍ - Aurizn Awards 2018 'Cars of Malaysia'
- Budget Car (Bronze Winner) - Carlist.my People's Choice Awards 2018
- Best Compact Sedan (below RM70K) - CarSifu Editors’ Choice Awards 2019
- 4-star ASEAN NCAP safety rating under outgoing 2021 - 2025 test protocol

== Sales ==
Year	Malaysia (Note: Figures based on registration)
2008	66,057
2009	69,754
2010	69,835
2011	74,334
2012	65,490
2013	68,762
2014	57,014
2015	41,723
2016	31,662
2017	30,485
2018	27,916
2019	38,144
2020	45,561
2021	40,783
2022	53,469
2023	68,020
2024	69,863
2025	70,903
