= Toyota iQ =

City car

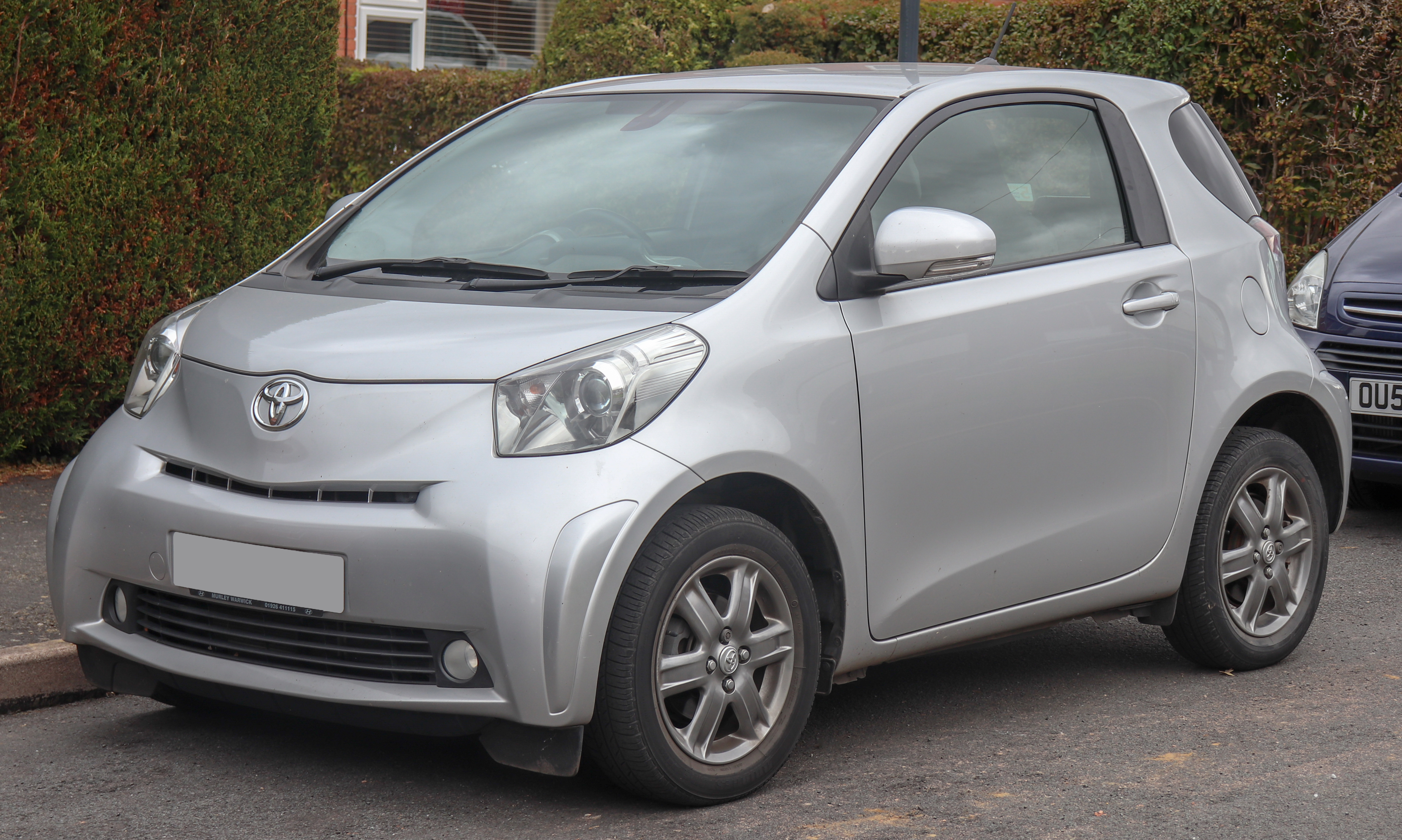
- 2010 Toyota iQ2 (UK)

Overview
- Type: City car
- Manufacturer: Toyota
- Model code: AJ10
- Also called: Scion iQ (US and Canada); Aston Martin Cygnet (Europe); Singulato iC3 (China)
- Production: 2008–2015; 2011–2013 (Aston Martin Cygnet)
- Model years: 2012–2015 (US)
- Assembly: Japan: Toyota, Aichi (Takaoka plant)
- Designer: Toyota ED^{2}; Hiroki Nakajima (2006)

Body and chassis
- Class: City car
- Body style: 3-door hatchback
- Layout: Front-engine, front-wheel drive

Powertrain
- Engine: 1.0 L 1KR-FE petrol I3; 1.3 L 1NR-FE petrol I4; 1.3 L 1NR-FSE petrol supercharger I4 (iQ GRMN Supercharger); 1.4 L 1ND-FTV diesel I4
- Electric motor: Permanent Magnet Electric motor (Singulato iC3)
- Transmission: 5-speed manual; 6-speed manual; CVT Aisin K41

Dimensions
- Wheelbase: 2,000 mm (78.7 in)
- Length: Toyota iQ: 2,985 mm (117.5 in); Scion iQ: 3,051 mm (120.1 in); AM Cygnet: 3,078 mm (121.2 in)
- Width: 1,680 mm (66.1 in)
- Height: 1,500 mm (59.1 in)
- Curb weight: Toyota iQ: 860 kg (1,896 lb); Scion iQ: 965 kg (2,127 lb); AM Cygnet: 988 kg (2,178 lb)

The Toyota iQ is a city car manufactured by Toyota and marketed in a single generation for Japan (2008–2016); Europe (2008–2015); and North America (2012–2015), where it was marketed as the Scion iQ. A rebadged variant was marketed in Europe as the Aston Martin Cygnet (2011–2013).

Designed at the Toyota European Design and Development studio in Nice, France, the iQ is noted for its specialized engineering to maximize passenger space and minimize length. The design accommodates four occupants.

Following a concept presented at the 2007 Frankfurt Motor Show, the production iQ debuted at the March 2008 Geneva Motor Show. Japanese sales began in November 2008 and European sales in January 2009. In 2008, the iQ was named the Japanese Car of the Year.

The name iQ is an initialism of the term intelligence quotient. The letters "iQ" also stand for "individuality", "innovation", "quality", a hint at its "cubic form" and also a "cue" for owners to embrace new types of vehicles and lifestyles.

The iQ reached the end of production in December 2015, and it was discontinued in Japan in April 2016.

== Overview ==
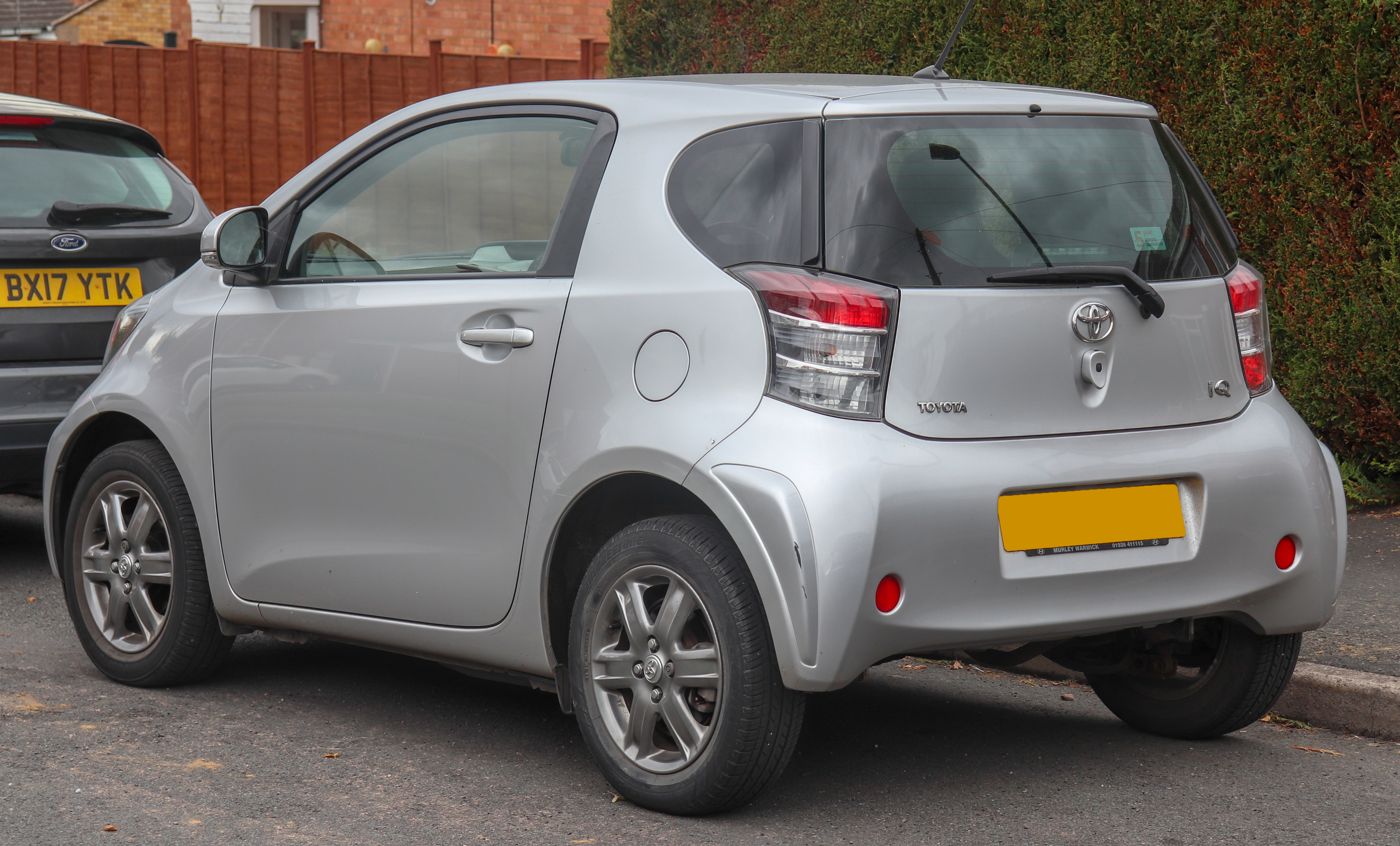
2010 Toyota iQ2 (UK)

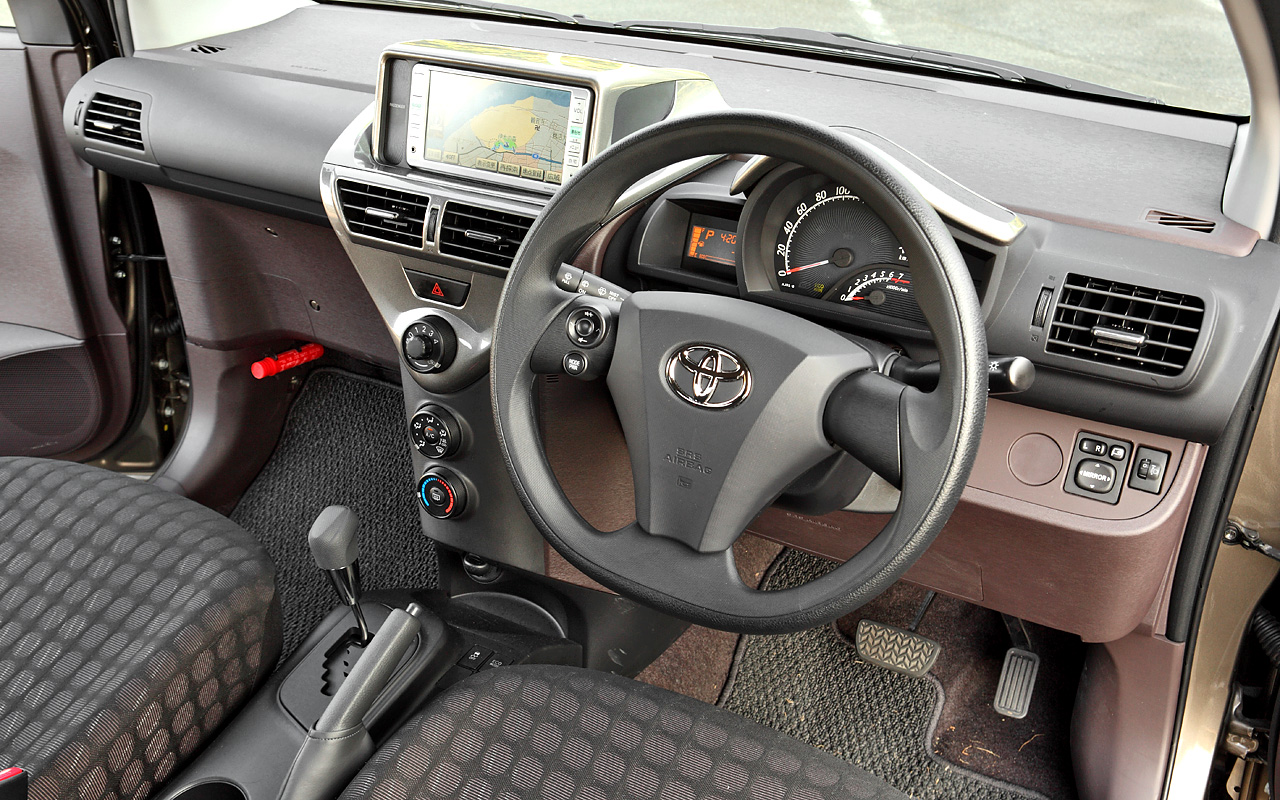
Interior

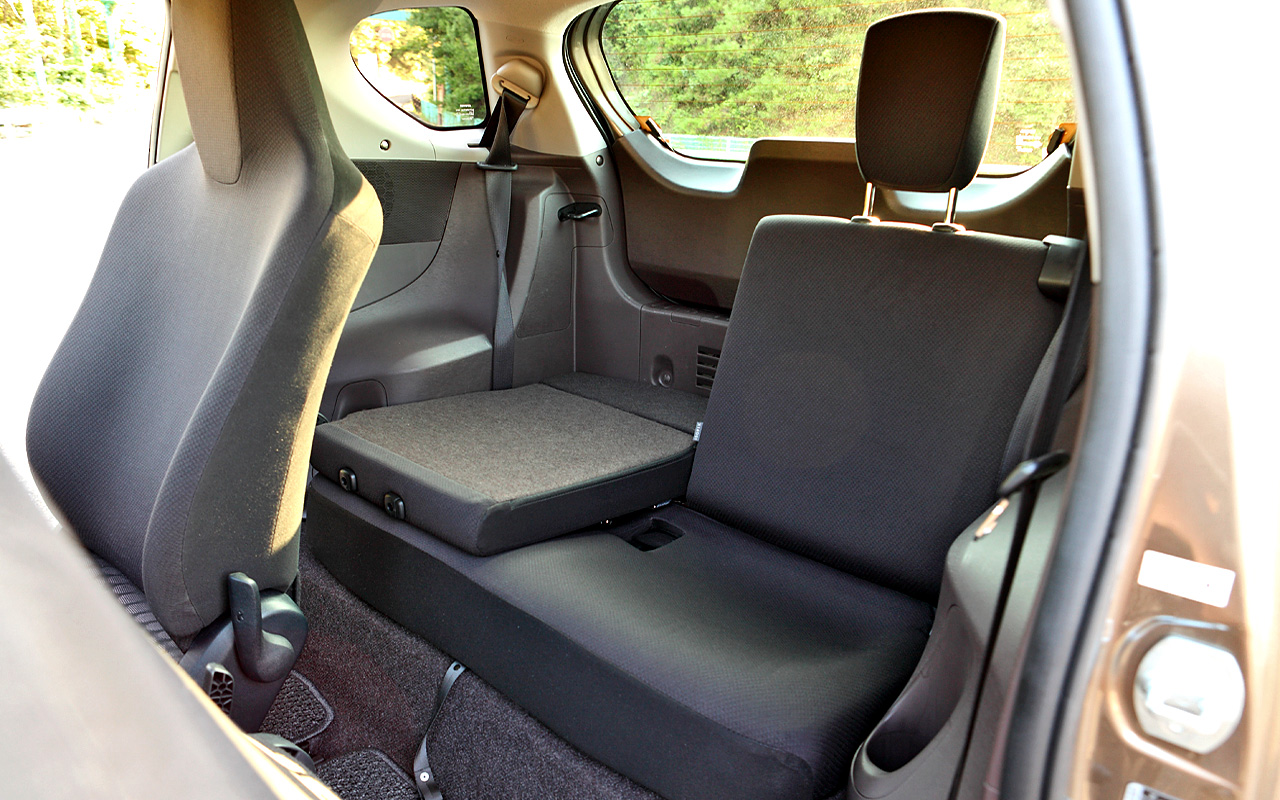
Rear interior

The IQ design emphasizes fuel efficiency, maneuverability, low environmental impact, and interior space. Six design factors enable the minimal overhangs, forward windscreen location, maximized cabin space and overall compactness:

- A newly developed differential mounted further forward than usual
- A centre take-off steering gear
- A flat fuel tank positioned underneath the cabin floor
- Rear-angled shock absorbers to encroach less on rear passenger space
- A smaller heater/air conditioning unit mounted centrally behind the asymmetric dashboard
- A slimmer seat design.

The iQ features a transmissions differential housing located ahead of, rather than behind, the engine; a starter motor incorporated in the engine's flywheel, a high-mounted steering rack and a compact, high-located air conditioning unit behind the dashboard central area. The arrangement allows the front passenger to sit forward of the driver, giving increased rear passenger legroom. A shallow under-floor fuel tank reduces rear overhang.

Because of its overall width and engine displacement, the iQ is classified in its home market as a supermini, though its length complies with kei car dimensional regulations.

European sales of the iQ peaked at 44,282 in 2009, and then gradually decreased to less than a thousand in 2015. In Europe, the iQ was priced at approximately £10,000, more than the larger Toyota Aygo.

Production of the Scion iQ EV (Toyota eQ in Japan) was to be limited to 100 units for special fleet use in Japan and carsharing demonstration projects in the U.S. Deliveries of the all-electric version with a range of 80 km (50 mi) began in the U.S. in March 2013.

== Details ==
=== Model codes ===
Toyota internally designated the iQ as the AJ10, with further sub-model chassis codes:

Chassis code	KGJ10-BGXRG	KGJ10-BGXNG	NGJ10-BGXNG	NUJ10-BGFNW
Body style	2-seat	4-seat	4-seat	4-seat
Engine	1KR-FE	1KR-FE	1NR-FE	1ND-TV
Years	2009–2015	2008–2015	2008–2015	2008–2015

The two seat variant was marketed solely in Japan.

=== Engines ===
Model	Type	Power at rpm	Torque at rpm	CO2 emission (g/km)
Petrol engines
1.0	998 cc (60.9 cu in) I3 (1KR-FE)	68 PS (50 kW; 67 hp) at 6,000	98 N⋅m (72 lbf⋅ft) at 4,800	99 manual, 110 CVT
1.0 (Japan)	996 cc (60.8 cu in) I3 (1KR-FE)	68 PS (50 kW; 67 hp) at 6,000	98 N⋅m (72 lbf⋅ft) at 4,800	CVT: 101 in 10・15 mode, 112 in JC08 mode
1.33	1,329 cc (81.1 cu in) I4 (1NR-FE)	98 PS (72 kW; 97 hp) at 6,000	123 N⋅m (91 lbf⋅ft) at 4,400	113 manual, 120 CVT
1.3 (Japan)	1,329 cc (81.1 cu in) I4 (1NR-FE)	94 PS (69 kW; 93 hp) at 6,000	118 N⋅m (87 lbf⋅ft) at 4,400	CVT: 101 in 10・15 mode, 112 in JC08 mode
Diesel engines
1.4D	1,364 cc (83.2 cu in) I4 (1ND-FTV)	90 PS (66 kW; 89 hp) at 3,400	190 N⋅m (140 lbf⋅ft) at 1,800–3,200	104 manual

The 1.0L engine is similar to the engine in Toyota Aygo. The iQ achieves 65.69 mpg_{‑imp} (4.3 L/100 km; 55 mpg_{‑US}) by European standards. UK models include only petrol engines.

Early Japanese models include only 1.0L three-cylinder engine. 1.33L engine option was added beginning in 2009. Models with the 1.33L engine include start and stop system, however, only with the manual transmission.

The car is capable of fitting 1.6L four-cylinder engine.

=== Transmissions ===
Model	Type
1.0	5-speed manual, CVT (CVT‐i)
1.33	6-speed manual, CVT (Super CVT‐i)
1.4D	6-speed manual

Japanese models include only CVT transmission.

=== Specifications ===
	1.0 VVT-i	1.33 Dual-VVT-i	1.4 D-4D
Production	Nov 2008 – Dec 2015	May 2009 – Dec 2015	Nov 2008 – Apr 2012
Standard trim level	iQ	iQ^{3}	iQ
Engine	Petrol		Diesel
Engine Type	1KR-FE	1NR-FE	1ND-TV
Displacement	998 cc (60.9 cu in)	1,329 cc (81.1 cu in)	1,364 cc (83.2 cu in)
Max. power	50 kW (67 hp; 68 PS) at 6,000 rpm	72 kW (97 hp; 98 PS) at 6,000 rpm	66 kW (89 hp; 90 PS) at 3,400 rpm
Max. torque	98 N⋅m (72 lbf⋅ft) at 4,800 rpm	123 N⋅m (91 lbf⋅ft) at 4,400 rpm	190 N⋅m (140 lbf⋅ft) at 1,800–3,200 rpm
Transmission	5-speed manual or CVT	6-speed manual or CVT	6-speed manual
Wheels / tires	175 / 65 / R15 J5	175 / 60 / R16 J5	175 / 65 / R15 J5
0–100 km/h (62 mph) (in sec.)	14.7	11.8	10.7
Maximum speed	155 km/h (96 mph)	170 km/h (106 mph)	
Fuel consumption, city	4.9 l/100 km (58 mpg_{‑imp}; 48 mpg_{‑US})	5.9 l/100 km (48 mpg_{‑imp}; 40 mpg_{‑US})	4.8 l/100 km (59 mpg_{‑imp}; 49 mpg_{‑US})
Fuel consumption, highway	3.9 l/100 km (72 mpg_{‑imp}; 60 mpg_{‑US})	4.2 l/100 km (67 mpg_{‑imp}; 56 mpg_{‑US})	3.5 l/100 km (81 mpg_{‑imp}; 67 mpg_{‑US})
Fuel consumption, combined	4.3 l/100 km (66 mpg_{‑imp}; 55 mpg_{‑US})	4.8 l/100 km (59 mpg_{‑imp}; 49 mpg_{‑US})	4.0 l/100 km (71 mpg_{‑imp}; 59 mpg_{‑US})
CO_{2} emission	99 g/km (5.6 oz/mi)	113 g/km (6.4 oz/mi)	104 g/km (5.9 oz/mi)
Curb weight	845–885 kg (1,863–1,951 lb)	930–955 kg (2,050–2,105 lb)	935–975 kg (2,061–2,150 lb)
Gross weight	1,200–1,210 kg (2,650–2,670 lb)	1,270 kg (2,800 lb)	1,280–1,285 kg (2,822–2,833 lb)
Noise, in db(A)	67.3	69.5	68.7

=== Safety ===
Euro NCAP test results Toyota iQ 1.0, LHD (2009)
Test	Points	%
Overall:	5 /5 stars	
Adult occupant:	33	91%
Child occupant:	35	71%
Pedestrian:	19	54%
Safety assist:	6	86%

The iQ includes nine airbags, dual frontal airbags, front seat-mounted side torso airbags, side curtain airbags, front passenger seat cushion airbag, a driver's knee airbag and a newly developed rear curtain airbag to protect backseat passengers' heads from rear-end collisions. Vehicle Stability Control, traction control, anti-lock brakes, brake assist, and electronic brakeforce distribution come standard.

In 2013, the UK's Vehicle and Operator Services Agency voted the Toyota iQ as top three-year-old car most likely to pass its first Ministry of Transport road worthiness test.

In 2023, Toyota and their subsidiary Daihatsu posted a notice that iQ models made for Japan and Europe had "irregularities" during safety tests (such as data falsifications and use of unauthorized testing procedures. Daihatsu noted that for most vehicles including the iQ, "performance standards stipulated by laws and regulations are [still] satisfied".

== Scion iQ ==
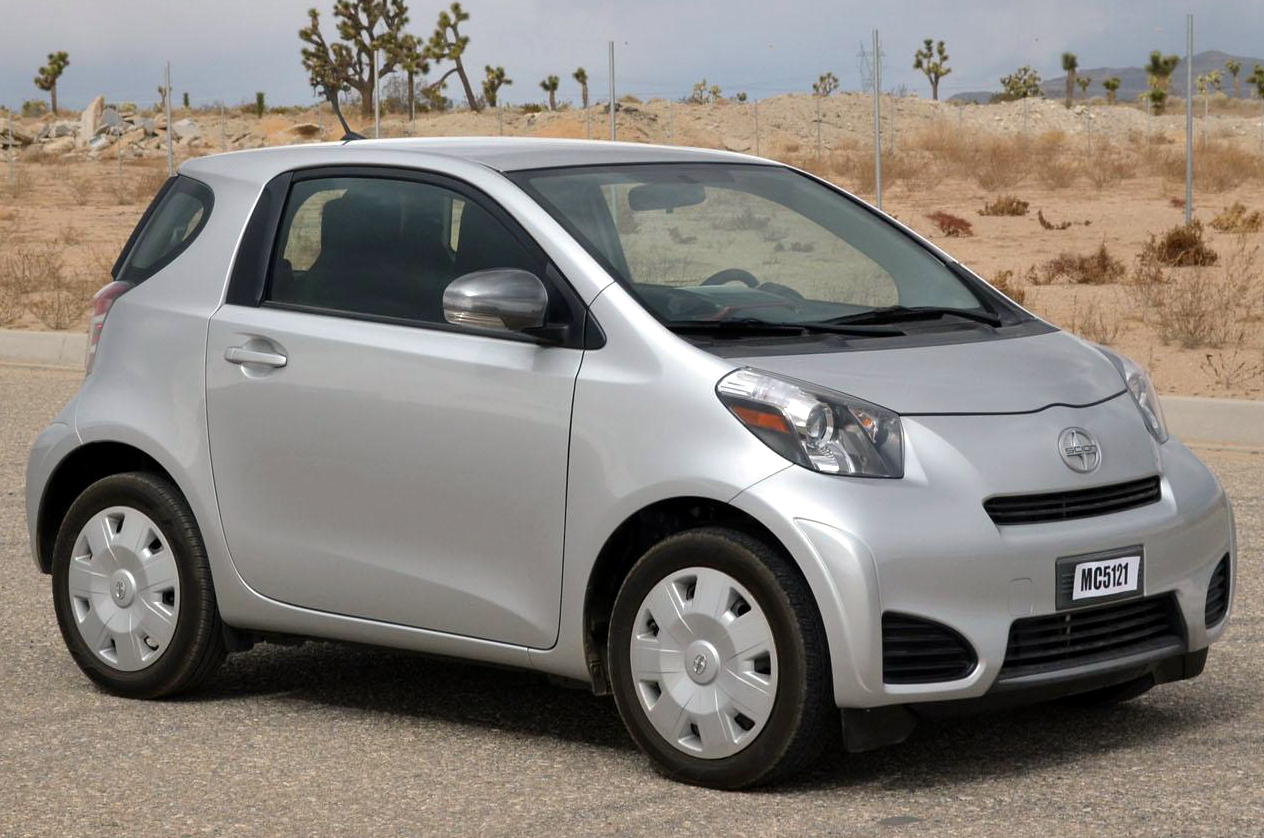
Scion iQ (US)

In the United States and Canada, the iQ was marketed under Toyota's Scion brand, then Toyota's North American small car brand. The car was introduced in 2012 and discontinued with its Toyota counterpart in 2015. The production Scion iQ debuted at the 2010 New York Auto Show and was marketed for model years 2012 to 2015. In North America, the iQ was only available with the 1.3 L 1NR-FE engine paired to a CVT automatic.

== Toyota eQ/Scion iQ EV ==
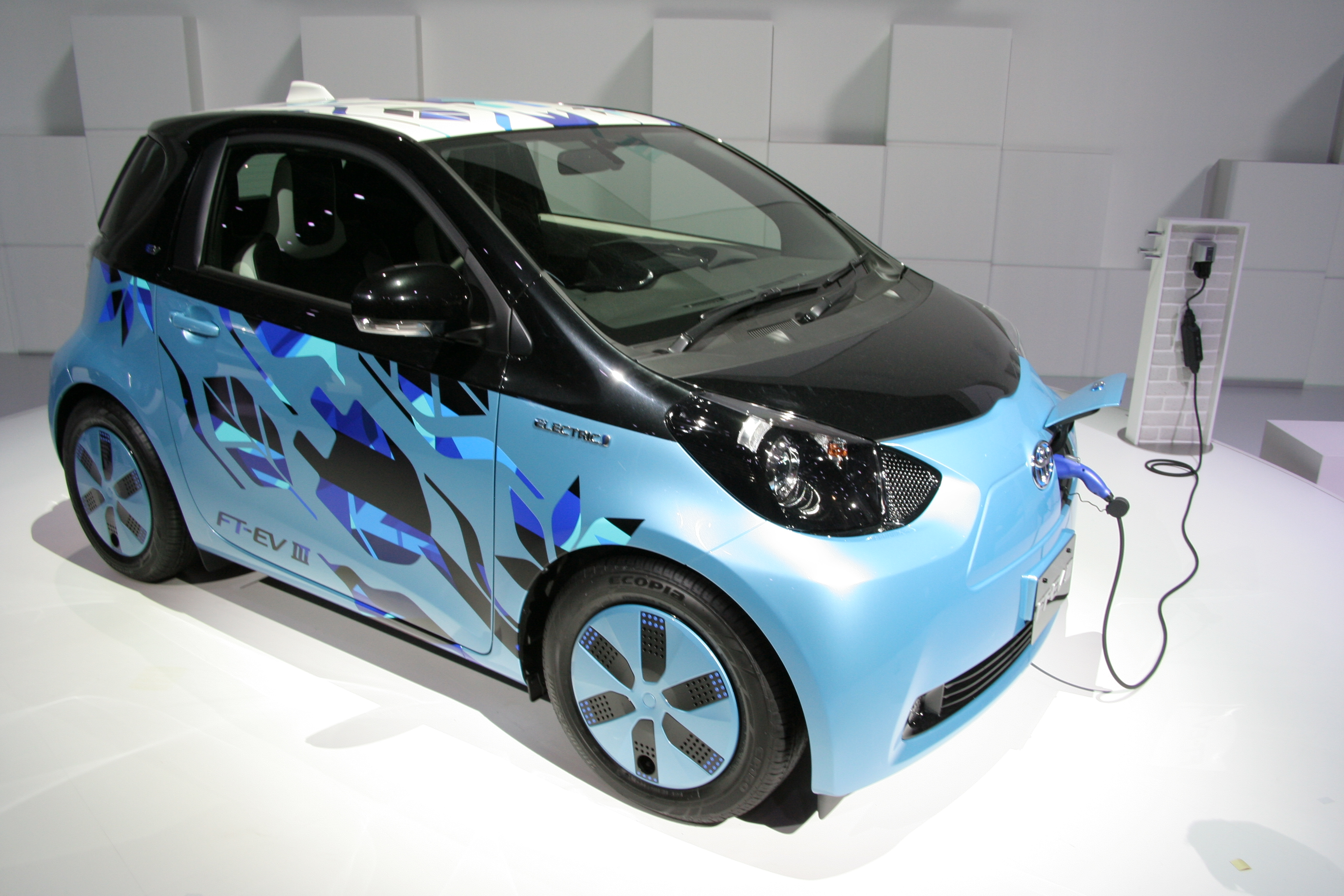
The Toyota eQ/Scion iQ EV is based on Toyota's three generations of FT-EV concept. Shown is the Toyota FT-EV III concept car at the 2011 Tokyo Motor Show.

A prototype of the Toyota eQ (Scion iQ EV in the US) was exhibited at the 2011 Geneva Motor Show. The Scion iQ EV is the successor to the FT-EV II as an electric vehicle based on the Toyota iQ chassis. Toyota produced three generations of FT-EV concept cars, and the iQ EV is a production version of those concepts, incorporating the technological and design strengths of all three models. The exterior of the production version is based on the FT-EV III concept shown at the 2011 Tokyo Motor Show.

The U.S. launch of the limited-production Scion iQ EV was announced for 2012, and according to Toyota, for the initial roll-out the iQ EV would not be available to individual consumers, instead the carmaker decided to focus on fleet customers and car sharing programs. The iQ EV was scheduled to be produced at Toyota's Takaoka Plant in Toyota City beginning in August 2012 and the initial production was planned to be limited to 600 units, with 400 staying in Japan, 100 units destined to the U.S. and the other 100 for Europe. In September 2012 Toyota announced that due to customers' concerns about range and charging time, the production of the Scion iQ (Toyota eQ in Japan) will be limited to 100 units for special fleet use in Japan and the U.S. only, of which, 90 will be placed in American carsharing demonstration projects. The iQ EV will be priced in the Japanese market at ¥3.6 million (~US$45,000). The iQ EV/eQ was scheduled to be released in both countries in December 2012.

The first 30 units were delivered in the U.S. to the University of California, Irvine in March 2013 for use in its Zero Emission Vehicle-Network Enabled Transport (ZEV-NET) carsharing fleet. Since 2002 the ZEV-NET program has been serving the transport needs of the Irvine community with all-electric vehicles for the critical last mile of commutes from the Irvine train station to the UC campus and local business offices. In September 2013, another 30 units were allocated to City Carshare to operate Dash, a three-year pilot carsharing program in Hacienda Business Park, in Pleasanton, California.

=== Specifications ===
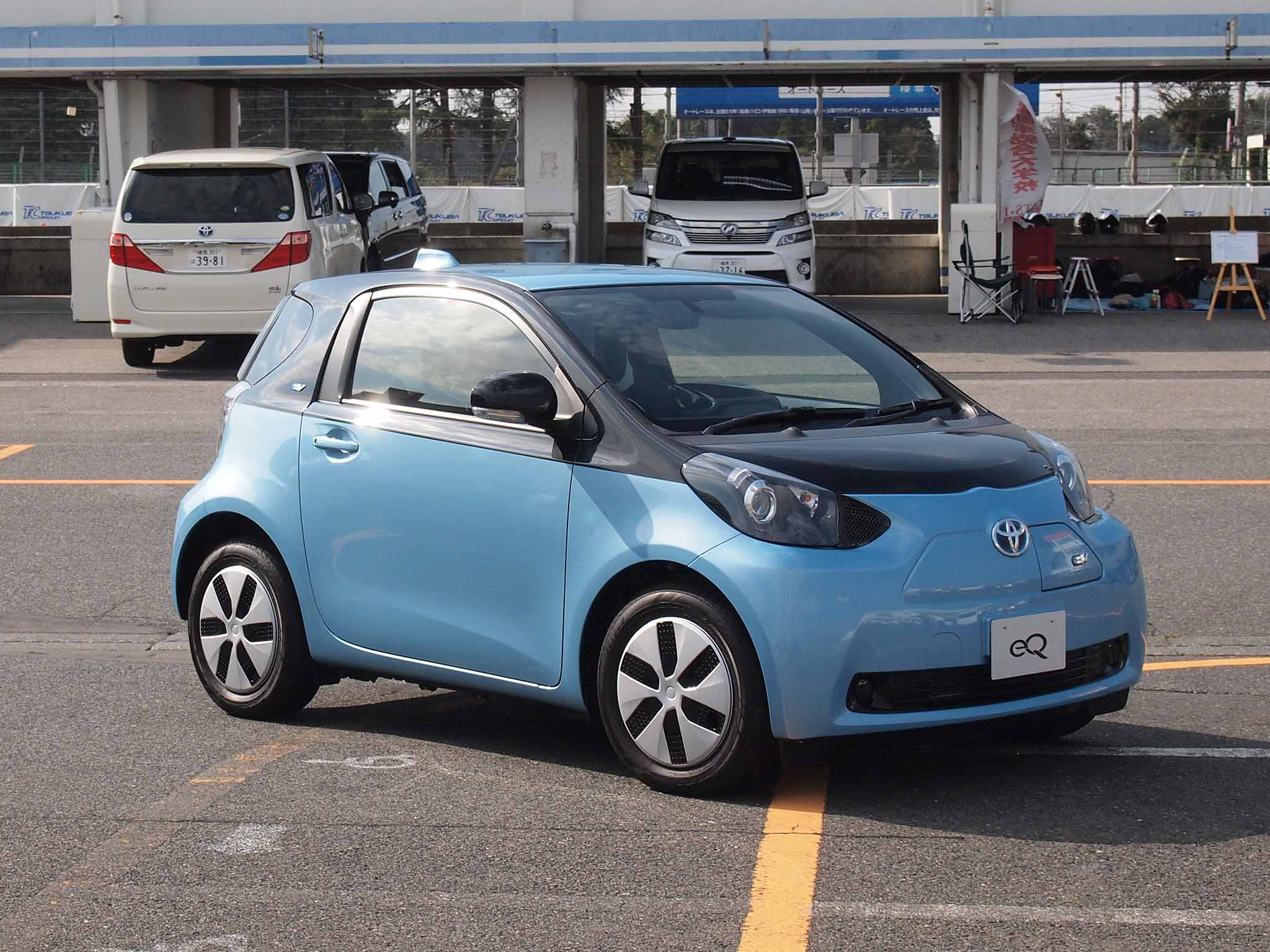
Toyota eQ electric city car

Designed as a city commuting vehicle, the iQ EV has a lower battery capacity that also translates into a shorter charging time, allowing the car to be fully recharged in approximately three hours, and using fast charging, the battery can be recharged up to 80% capacity in only 15 minutes. The iQ EV has a 150 cell 12 kWh 277.5 V lithium-ion battery pack that delivers a NEDC-certified range of 85 km (53 mi), and rated 80 km (50 mi) in the U.S. Based on further development of Toyota's Hybrid Synergy Drive technology, the iQ EV's fully electric powertrain comprises an air-cooled, 47 kW electric motor/generator, the 12 kWh battery pack, a 3 kW water-cooled battery charger, an inverter, a DC/DC converter and a motor speed reduction mechanism. Maximum torque of 163 N⋅m (120 lb⋅ft) is delivered to the front wheels, giving the iQ EV 0–100 km/h (62 mph) acceleration of 14.0 seconds and a maximum speed of 125 km/h (78 mph). Like other Toyota full hybrid vehicles, the iQ EV is equipped with a regenerative braking system.

The iQ EV has a minimum turning radius of just 4.1 m (13 ft) and with a length of 3,120 mm (122.8 in), making the iQ EV 135 mm (5.3 in) longer than a standard iQ. The electric car shares the iQ overall width of 1,680 mm (66.1 in), height of 1,505 mm (59.3 in) and wheelbase of 2,000 mm (78.7 in). High tensile sheet steel has been extensively used in the body shell construction to minimize the additional weight caused by the lithium-ion battery pack, and as a result, the iQ EV weighs just 125 kg (276 lb) more than a standard 1.3L CVT iQ.

=== Fuel economy ===
The U. S. Environmental Protection Agency rated the 2013 iQ EV with a combined fuel economy of 121 miles per gallon gasoline equivalent (MPG-e) (1.9 L/100 km) with an energy consumption of 28 kW-hrs/100 miles. The city rating is 138 MPG-e (1.7 L/100 km) with an energy consumption of 24 kW-hrs/100 miles and 105 MPG-e (2.2 L/100 km) with an energy consumption of 32 kW-hrs/100 miles for highway driving. As of December 2014, these ratings allow the 2013 iQ EV to be the second most fuel efficient EPA-certified vehicle of all fuel types considered in all years behind the BMW i3. The iQ EV was ranked first in DOE-EPA's 2013 Annual Fuel Economy Guide.

== Badge engineered cars ==
The iQ was badge engineered and sold by some other OEM manufacturers.

=== Aston Martin Cygnet ===
Aston Martin Cygnet (P298)

Overview
- Manufacturer: Aston Martin
- Production: January 2011 – September 2013
- Assembly: United Kingdom: Gaydon, Warwickshire

Body and chassis
- Class: City car
- Body style: 3-door hatchback

The Aston Martin Cygnet is a rebadged variant of the Toyota/Scion iQ marketed by Aston Martin beginning with the 2011 model year, allowing Aston Martin to comply with the 2012 European Union-imposed fleet average emissions regulations. It was developed under the codename P298.

The Cygnet was initially only marketed in the UK. Sales commenced in January 2011 and the market coverage was expanded to cover other European countries the following year. Sales were not restricted, but demand from existing Aston Martin owners for Cygnet was expected to take priority initially. Aston Martin CEO Ulrich Bez announced shipping expectations of about 4000 per year at a price of about £30,000 – about three times as much as the iQ. Bez stated that the Cygnet demonstrated the company's "commitment to innovation and integrity", whilst respecting the need to "satisfy demands of emissions and space".

The Cygnet featured revisions to the exterior and interior but shared other specifications with the iQ, having a 97 bhp (72 kW; 98 PS) 1.3L inline-four engine, it produced 110 g of CO_{2}/km and fuel consumption of 58.9 mpg_{‑US} (3.99 L/100 km; 70.7 mpg_{‑imp}).

In September 2013, after just over two years of production, Aston Martin announced that it would stop production of the Cygnet. The Cygnet has been the second shortest running production car in the history of Aston Martin after the 2012 Aston Martin Virage, which was only produced for a year. The Cygnet was cancelled due to disastrously low sales, with the car reaching only 150 units in the UK and fewer than 600 across Europe rather than its annual target of 4000.

In June 2018, Aston Martin announced a one-off 4.7-litre 321 kW (430 bhp) V8 edition of the Cygnet for a customer. It uses the engine, transmission, suspension, brakes and wheels from the Aston Martin Vantage S. New subframes and wheel arches were made to combine the body and mechanicals.

=== Specifications ===
Engine	Years	Type	Displacement	Power	Torque	0–100 km/h (0–62 mph)	Top speed	Drive	CO_{2} emission
Toyota 1NR-FE	2011–2013	I4	1,329 cc (1.3 L; 81.1 cu in)	72 kW (97 hp) at 6000	123 N⋅m (91 lb⋅ft) at 4400	11.8 s	170 km/h (106 mph)	FWD	116 g/km
Aston Martin AM14	2018	V8	4,735 cc (4.7 L; 288.9 cu in)	321 kW (430 hp) at 7300	490 N⋅m (361 lb⋅ft) at 5000	4.2 s	274 km/h (170 mph)	RWD	321 g/km

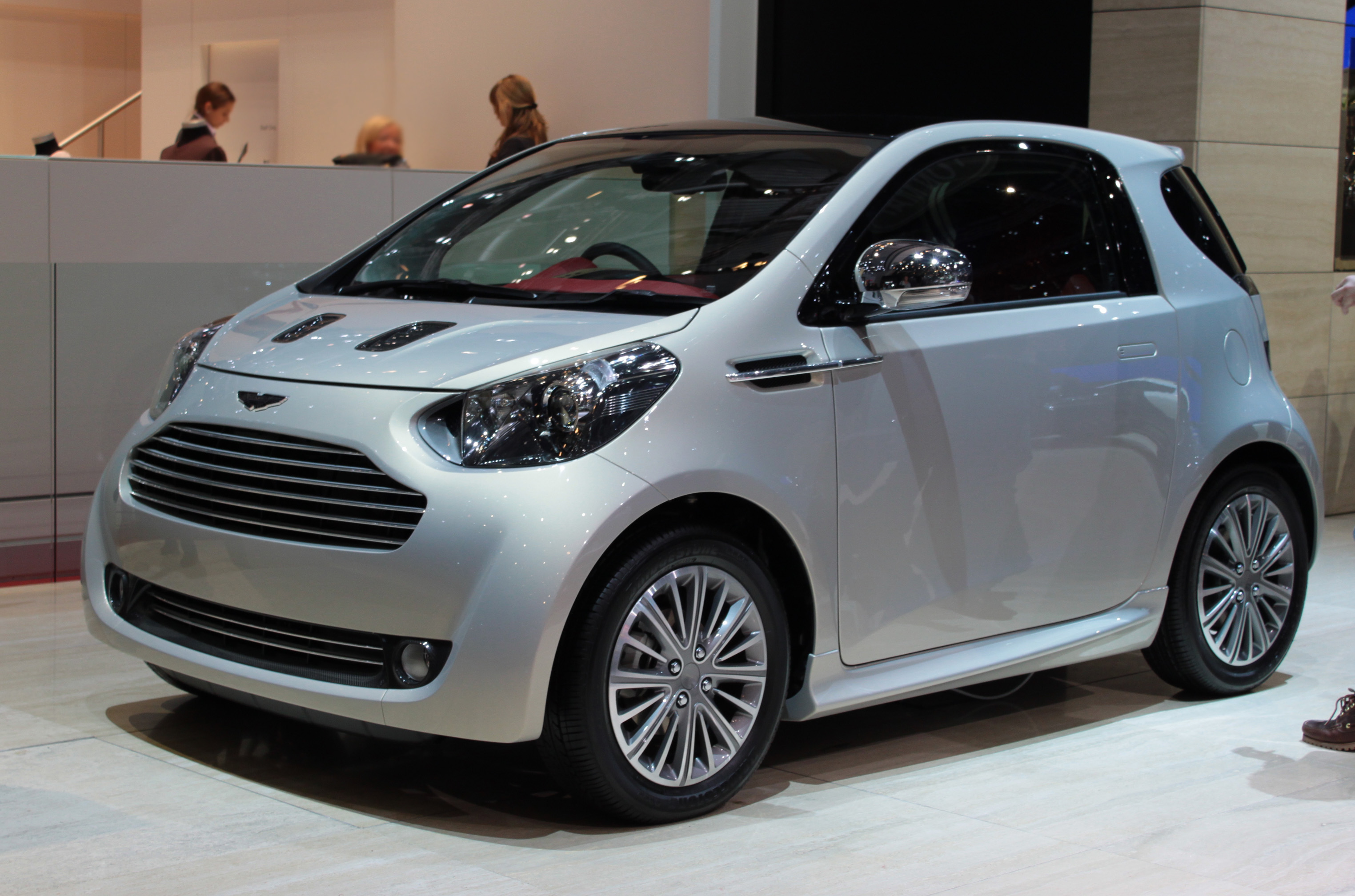
Aston Martin Cygnet concept

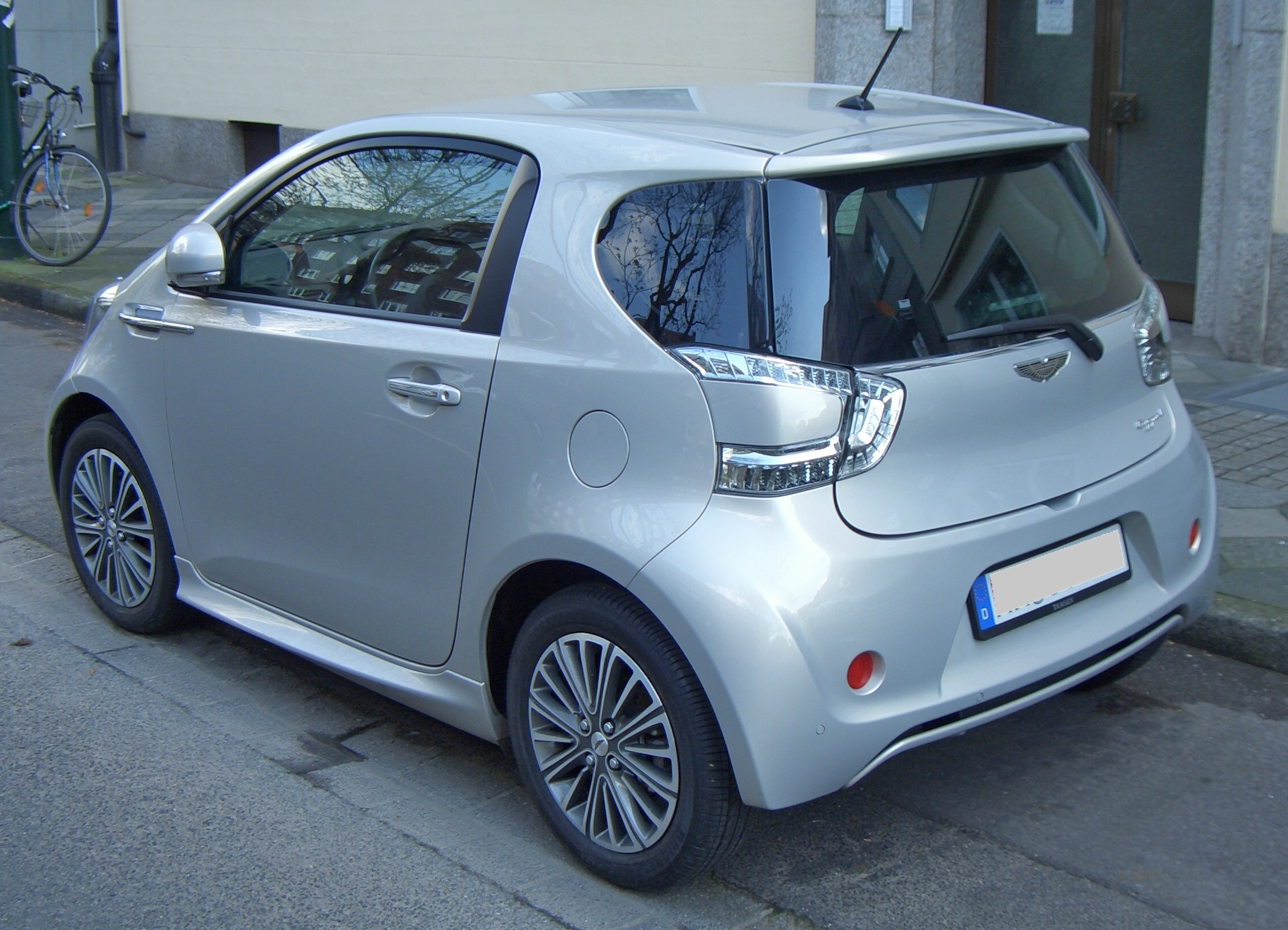
Aston Martin Cygnet

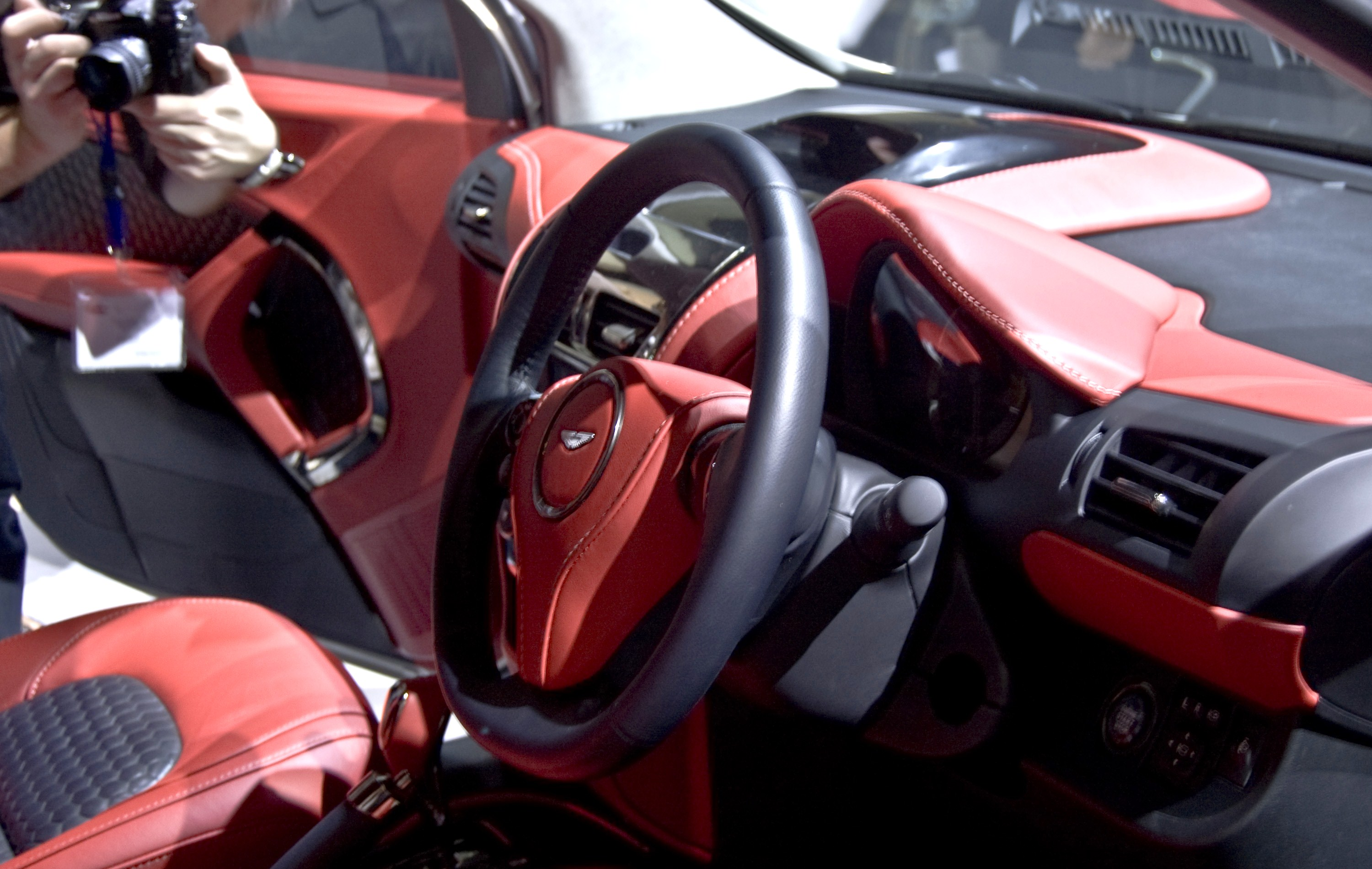
Aston Martin Cygnet interior

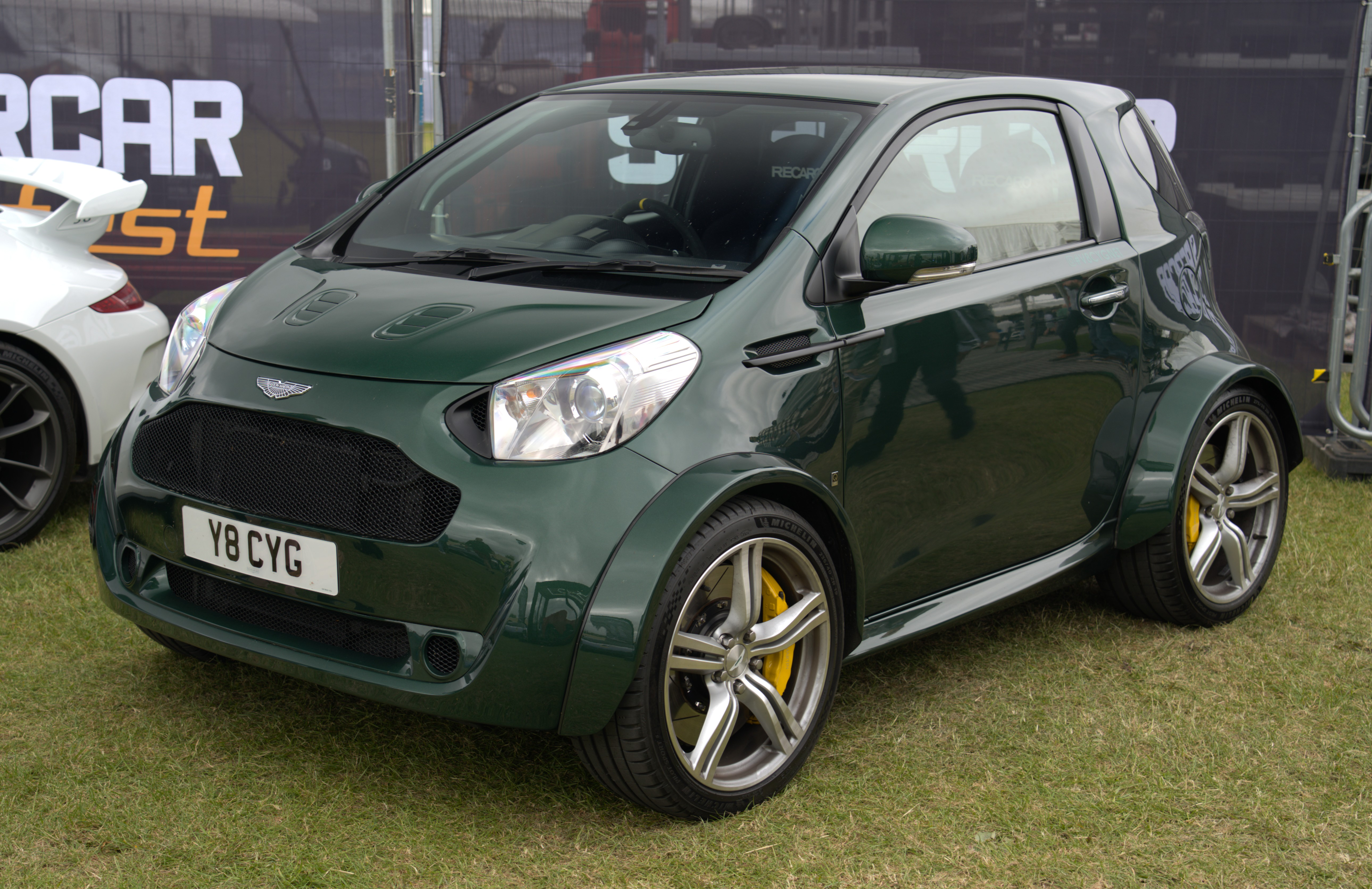
Aston Martin Cygnet V8

=== Singulato iC3 ===
Singulato iC3
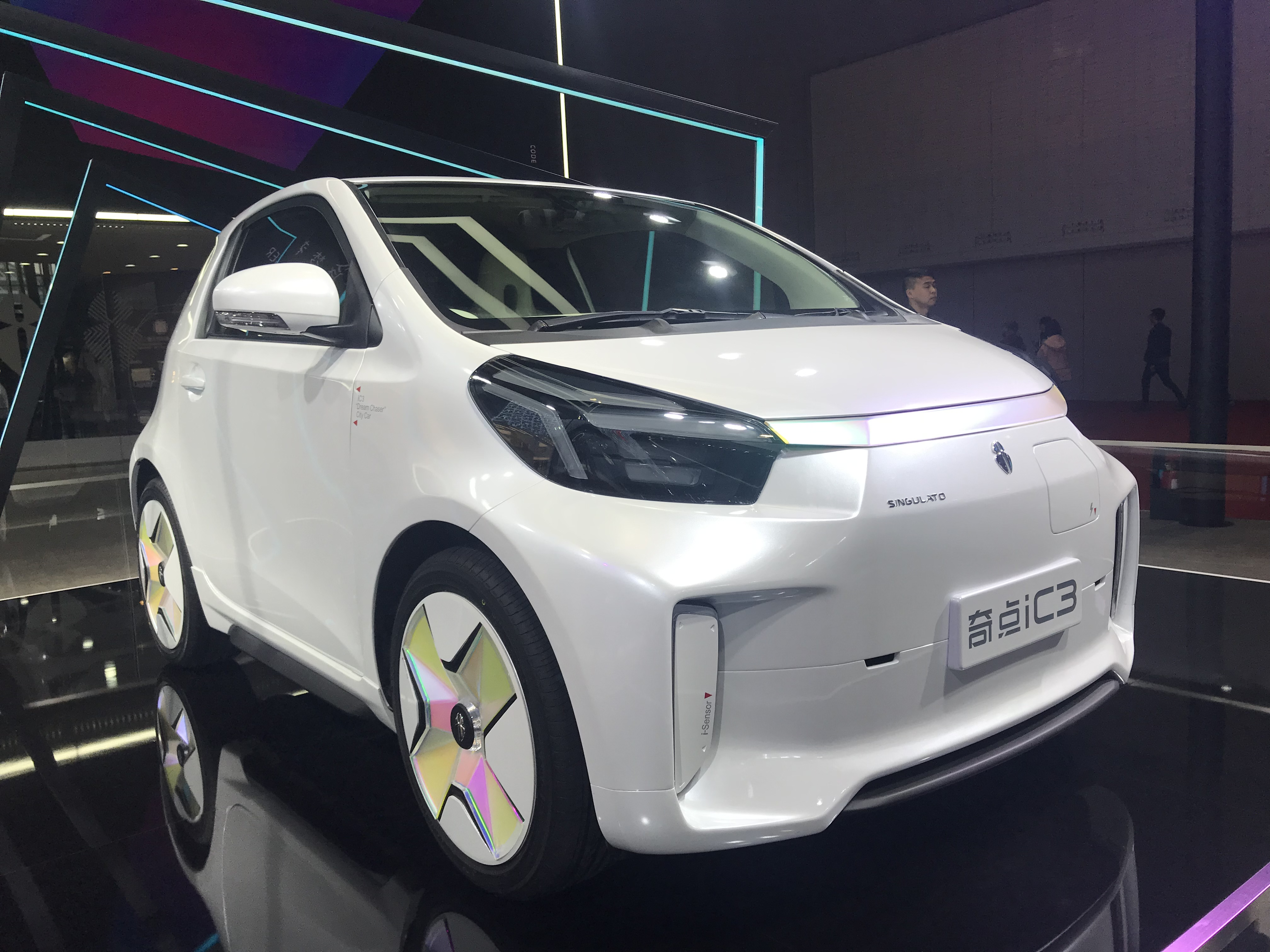

Overview
- Manufacturer: Singulato

Body and chassis
- Body style: hatchback

At the 2019 Auto Shanghai show, Chinese electric vehicle brand Singulato showed off its second production car, the iC3. The iC3 was created through negotiations with Toyota in order to use the platform and basic design of the iQ. In return, Toyota is allowed to use the Green Vehicle Credits produced by Singulato in China. The iC3 differs in design from the iQ in both the front and rear fascias. The iC3 never entered mainstream production, as Singulato filed for bankruptcy in 2023.

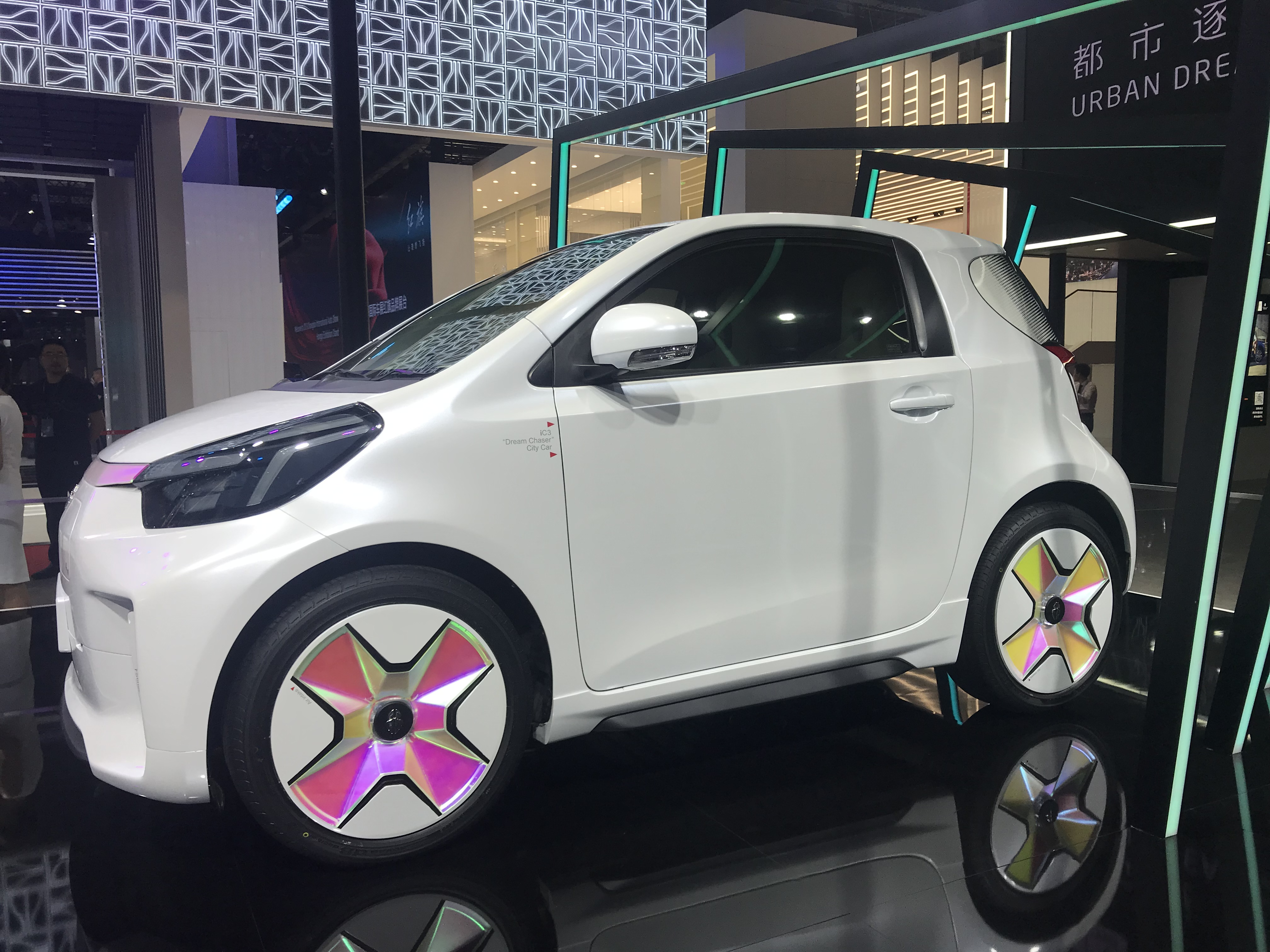
Singulato iC3

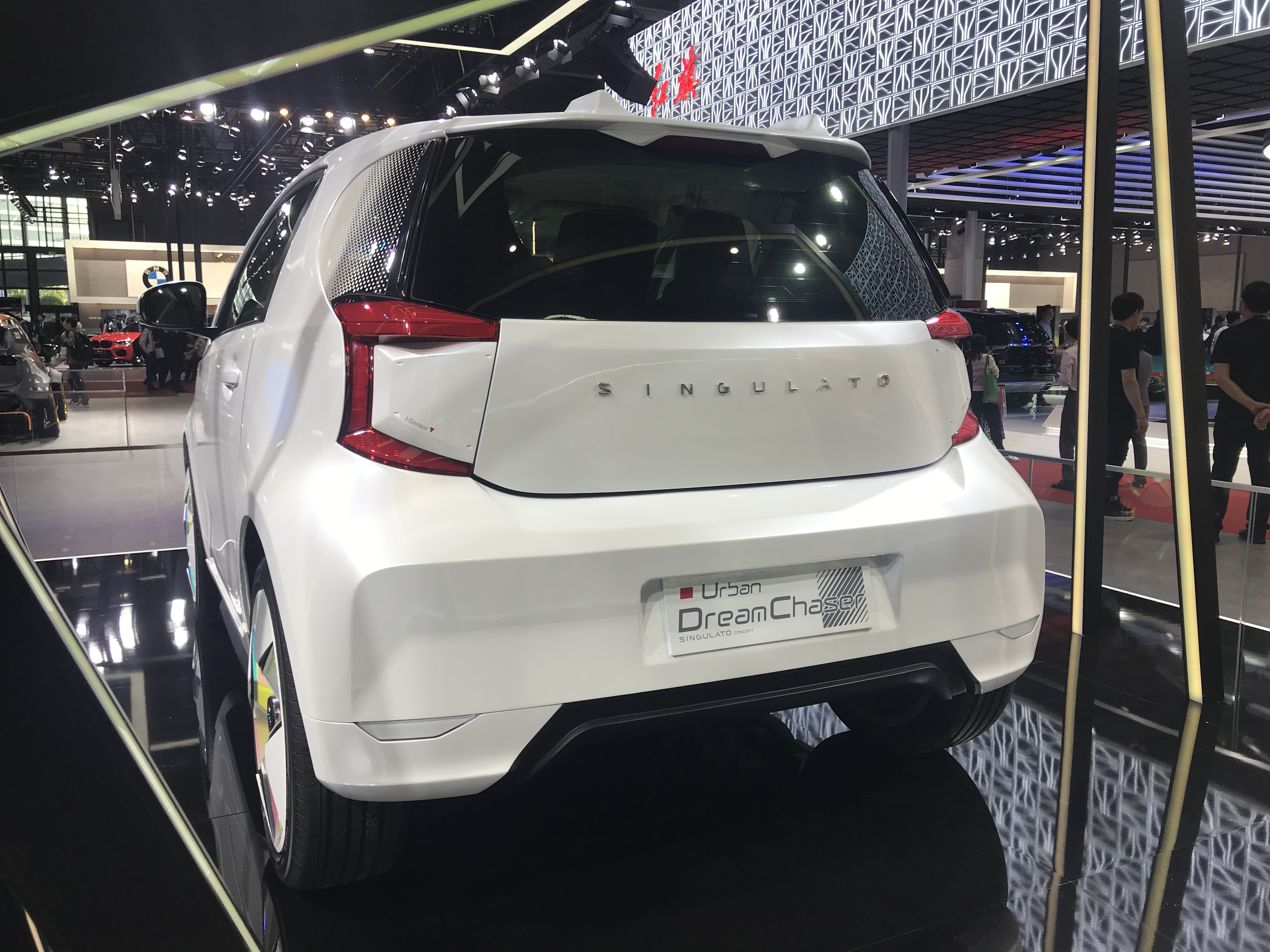
Singulato iC3 rear

=== Proton EMAS ===
Proton EMAS
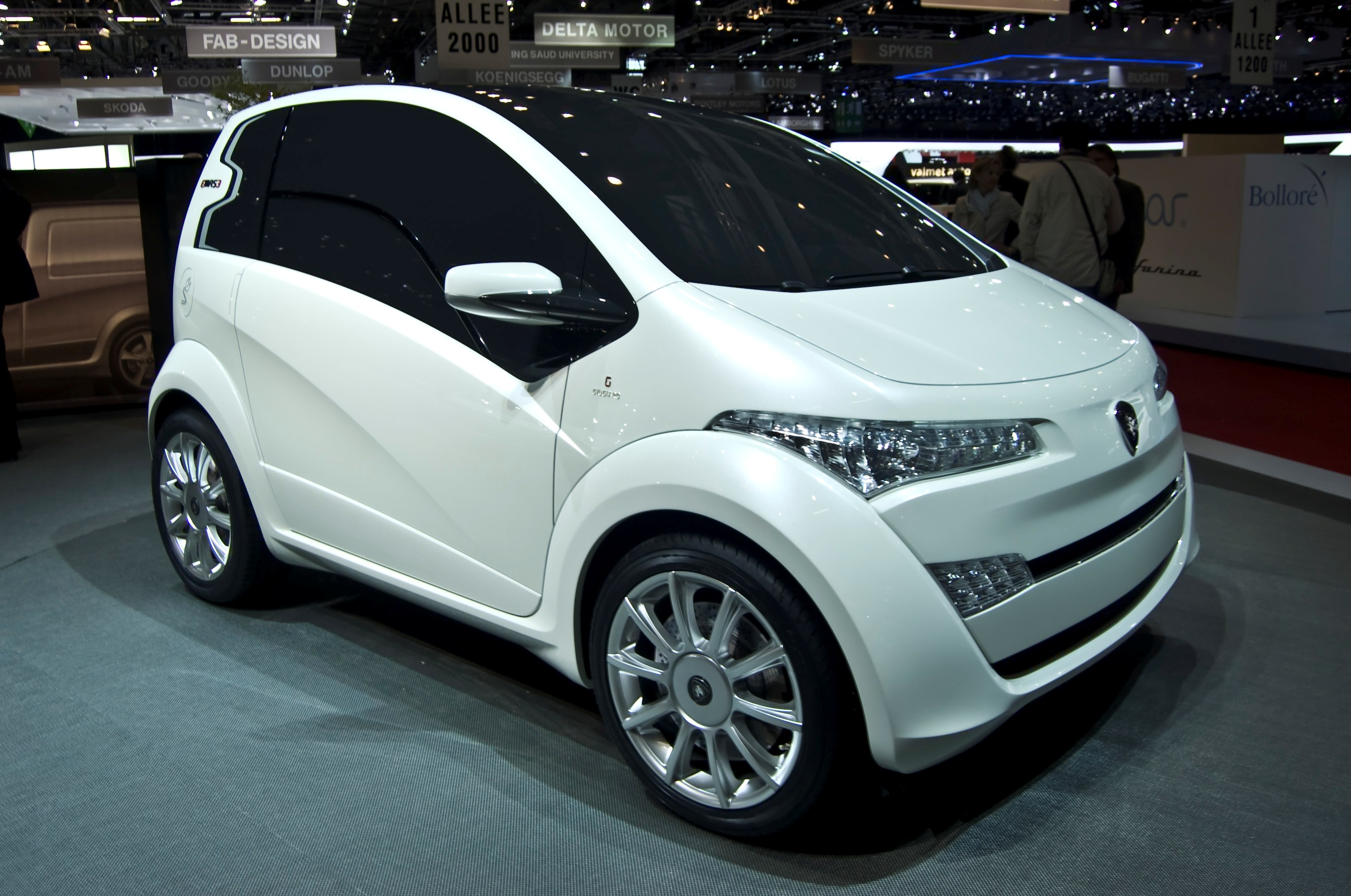
- Proton EMAS3 front View

Overview
- Manufacturer: Proton
- Production: 2010 (concept car)
- Designer: Italdesign Giugiaro

Body and chassis
- Class: City car
- Body style: 3 door and 5 door hatchback
- Layout: FF
- Platform: Toyota iQ (modified)
- Related: Lotus Ethos, Proton Iriz

Powertrain
- Engine: 1.2 litre three-cylinder flex-fuel capable petrol

Dimensions
- Wheelbase: 2,600 mm (102.4 in) interior
- Length: 3,555 mm (140.0 in) interior
- Width: 1,699 mm (66.9 in) interior
- Height: 1,576 mm (62.0 in) interior
- Curb weight: 1,400 kg (3,086 lb)

Proton EMAS is a range of concept cars designed by Italdesign Giugiaro and developed by Proton. It debuted at the 2010 Geneva Motor Show as a hybrid vehicle. It is based on the iQ platforms, steering and suspension, but uses a three-cylinder engine and electric motor supplied by Lotus.

"EMAS" is an acronym for Eco Mobility Advance Solution. The word "emas" means "gold" in Malay.

The Proton EMAS was planned to be Malaysia's and Proton's first global car and was expected to be in production by 2012. As of August 2014, the concept car had not reached production.

Proton's subsidiary Lotus Cars has shown a plug-in hybrid city concept car based on the EMAS named the Lotus Ethos.

== Special editions ==
=== Toyota iQ "Gazoo Racing tuned by MN" (130G, 2009) ===
This is a limited (100 units) version for the Japanese market. It includes a 1,329 cc (1.329 L; 81.1 cu in) I4 engine, 6-speed manual transmission, stiffer sport suspension that lowers its ride height by 30 mm (1.2 in), enhanced brakes, rear disc brakes, RAYS 16x5.5-in aluminium wheels with 175/60R16 tires, stiffening brace, tachometer, aluminium pedals, rear spoiler, GRMN emblem and a sport exhaust system.

The Gazoo Racing package adds a front bumper spoiler, side mudguards, rear bumper spoiler centre muffler, Toyota front fog lamps, original decal, front sport seat covers.

The vehicle was unveiled at the January 2009 Tokyo Auto Salon.

The Gazoo Racing cars were sold through Toyota's Netz dealer channel. It has MSRP of ¥1,972,000 (¥1,878,095+tax).

=== GRMN iQ Supercharger (2012) ===
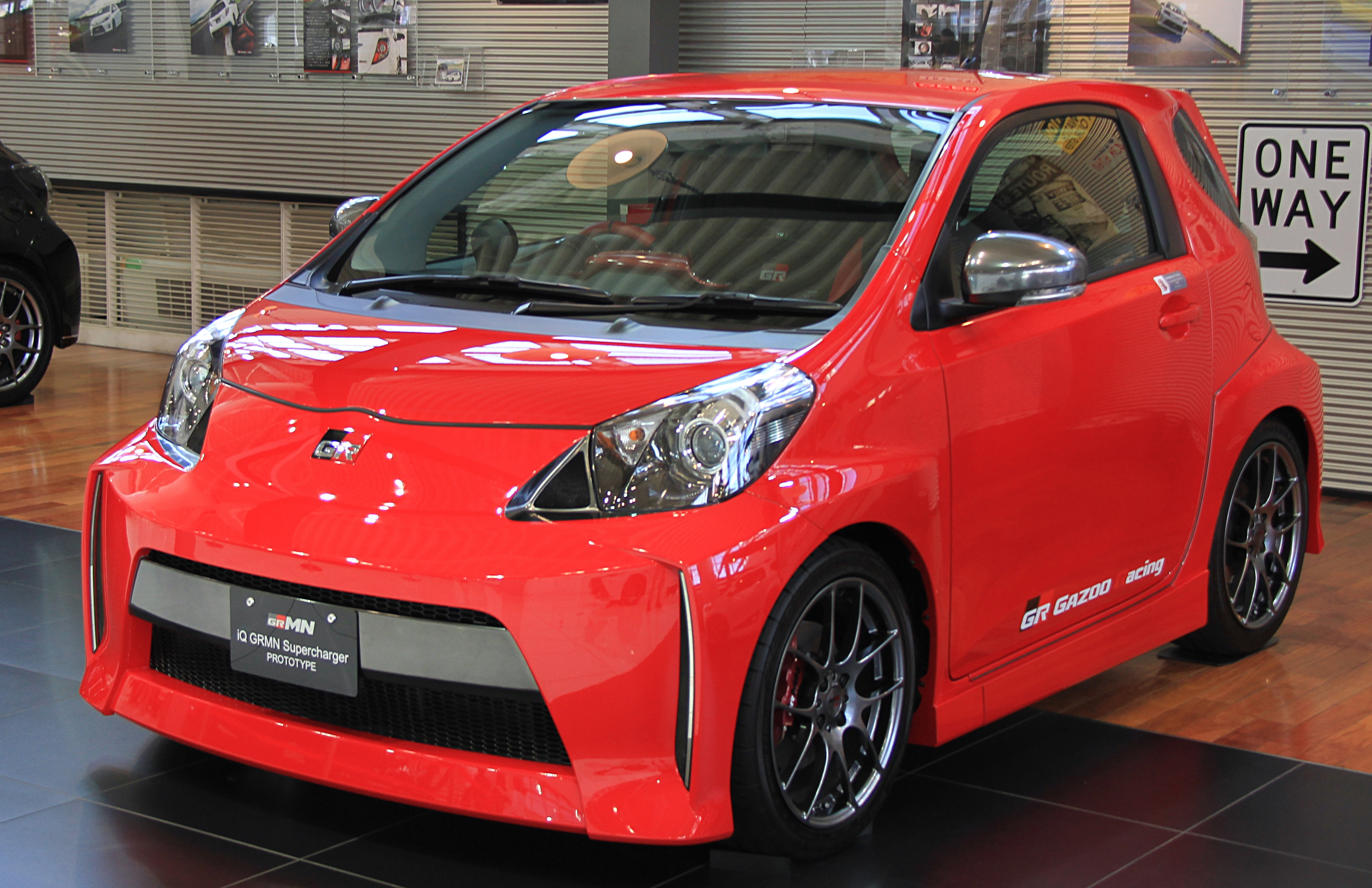
Toyota iQ GRMN Supercharger prototype

The GRMN iQ Supercharger is a limited (100 units) version of the iQ for the Japanese market, based on the Toyota iQ 130G MT. It included the supercharger found on the GRMN iQ Racing Concept car.

The prototype vehicle was unveiled at the 2012 Tokyo Auto Salon.

== Concept cars ==
=== Toyota iQ Concept (2007) ===
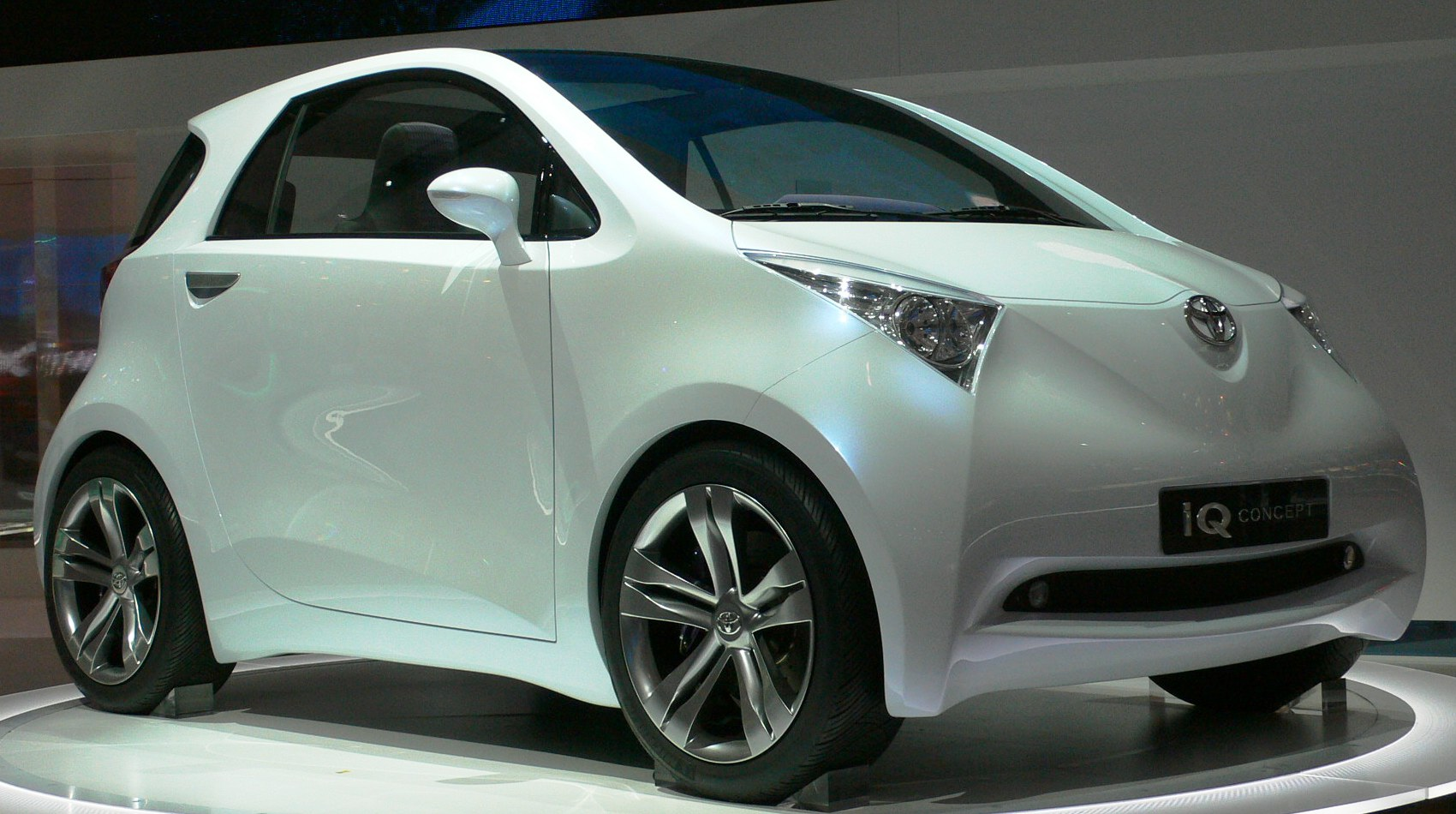
Toyota iQ Concept (2007)

The iQ concept was initially unveiled at the 2007 Frankfurt Motor Show.

=== Toyota FT-EV (2009) ===
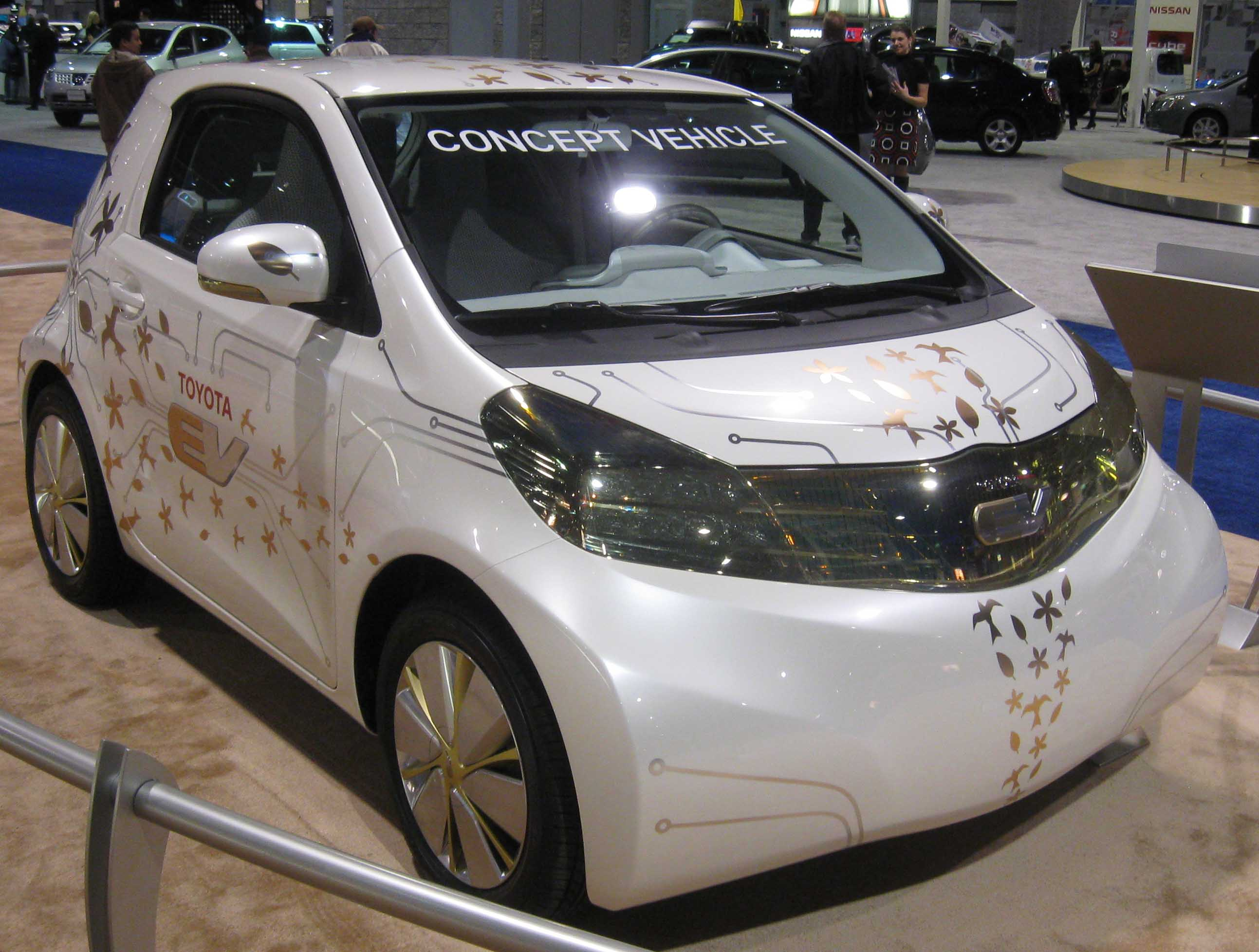
Toyota FT-EV concept

The Toyota FT-EV concept was unveiled at the January 2009 North American International Auto Show. It was a modified electric version of the Toyota iQ with an estimated capacity of 50 miles (80 km). Toyota planned to launch the production version of FT-EV in 2012.

=== Toyota FT-EV II (2009) ===
The Toyota FT-EV II was first shown at the October 2009 Tokyo Motor Show. It has a unique design compared to the FT-EV, with a transparent body and electrically operated sliding doors. A pair of linked joysticks (each joystick duplicating the other) control acceleration, braking and steering using drive-by-wire. The top speed is over 100 km/h (62 mph) and the range is 90 km (56 mi).

=== Toyota iQ Customize Car (2009–) ===
This is a family of Toyota iQ custom body kits in Japanese market.

MODELLISTA MAXI includes custom front bumper, side skirt, rear bumper. MODELLISTA MIXTURE includes custom B-pillar shadow, mirror cover, back window panel, side door trim. MODELLISTA MIXTURE side make set only includes custom mirror cover and side door trim.

=== Scion iQ Concept (2009) ===
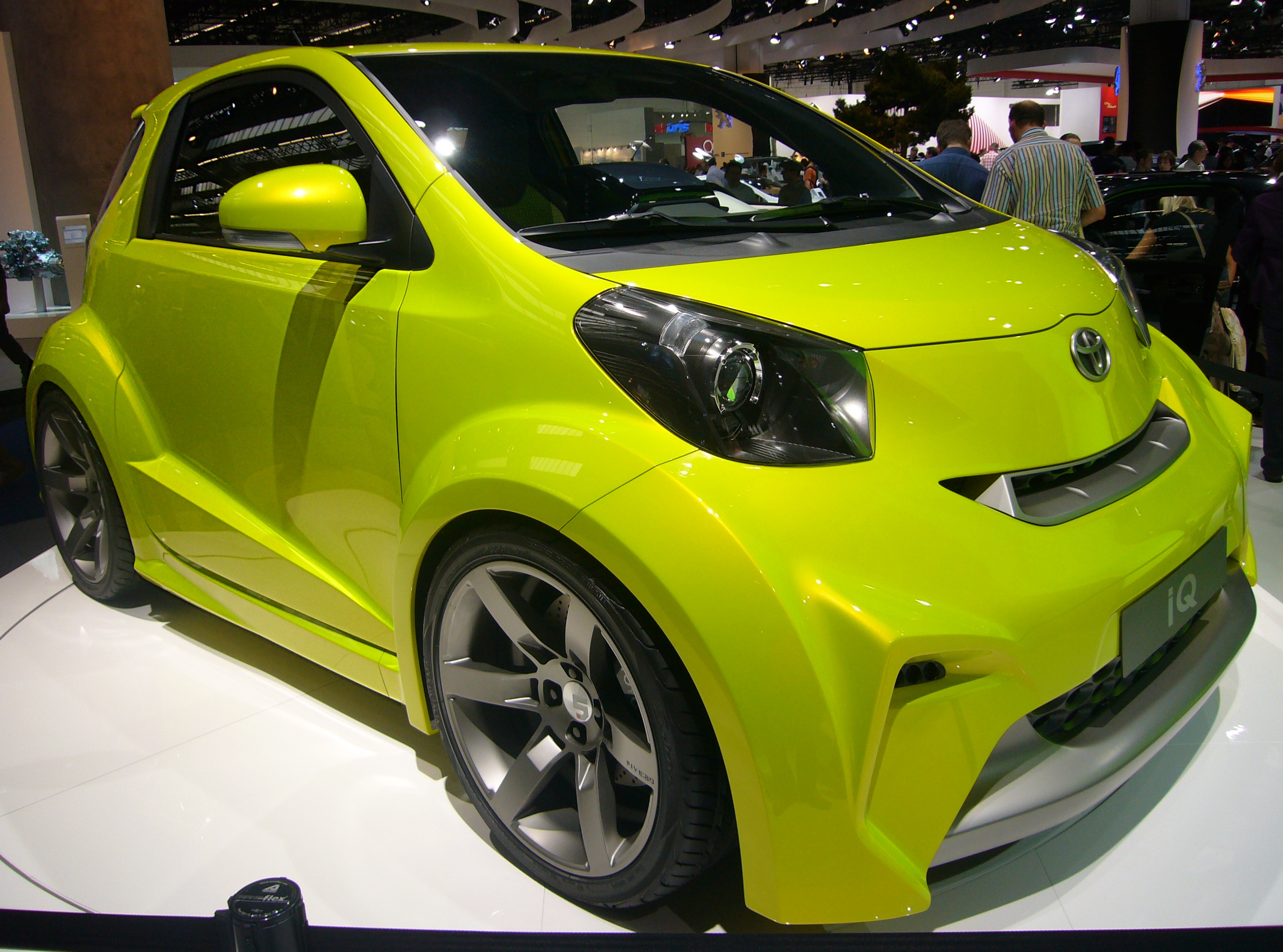
Toyota iQ for Sports Concept at the 2009 Frankfurt Motor Show

The Scion iQ Concept car was built by Five Axis (California, USA), based on a production Toyota iQ, and displayed in April 2009 at the New York Auto Show. It was also shown at the 2009 Frankfurt Motor Show as the Toyota iQ for Sports concept. The concept was equipped with a 1.3-liter, 1,329 cc (81 cu in) DOHC Inline-4 engine producing 94 hp (70 kW) and 89 lb⋅ft (121 N⋅m), as well as 18-inch wheels and widened wheel arches, with eleven airbags.

=== Toyota iQ Collection (2009) ===
Unveiled at the 2009 Frankfurt Motor Show, along with the iQ for Sports, the Toyota iQ Collection had a transparent acrylic roof, looking similar to the initial 2007 concept, and a custom interior.

=== GRMN iQ Racing Concept (2011) ===
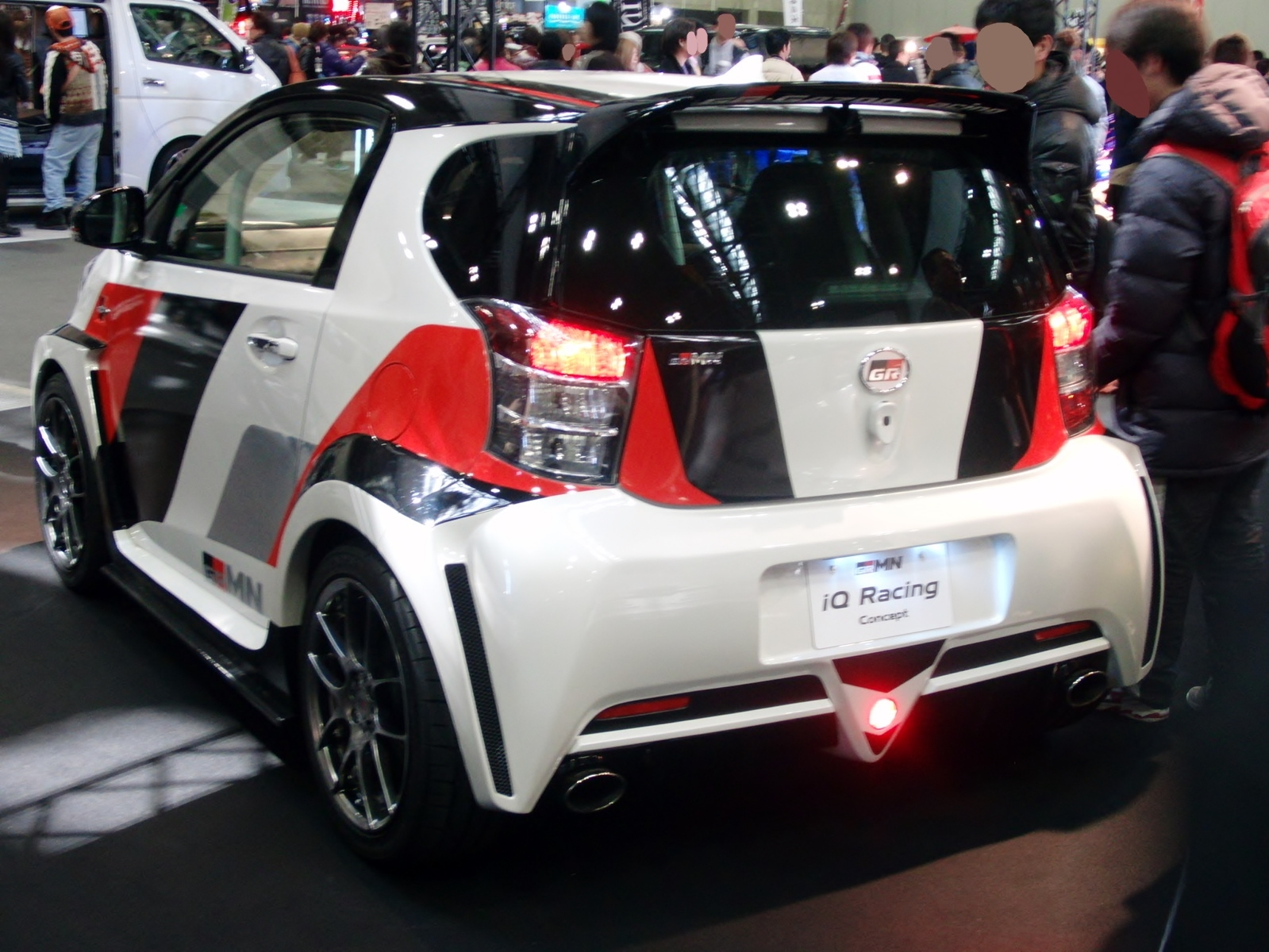
Toyota GRMN iQ Racing Concept

The GRMN iQ Racing Concept was based on Toyota iQ "Gazoo Racing tuned by MN" car sold in 2009, but was equipped with a supercharger and roll cage.

The vehicle was unveiled at the 2011 Tokyo Auto Salon.

=== Toyota FT-EV III ===
The FT-EV III was unveiled at the 2011 Tokyo Motor Show and was the latest concept version of the scheduled Scion iQ EV electric car.

== Sales ==
Year	Europe		U.S.
Year	Toyota iQ	Aston Martin Cygnet	Scion iQ
2008	40		
2009	44,282		
2010	23,313		
2011	12,955	261	248
2012	9,245	172	8,879
2013	5,462	131	4,046
2014	3,593	29	2,040
2015	292		482
2016	172		6
2017	2		6
2018	3		

== See also ==
- List of Toyota vehicles
