= Singulato iS6 =

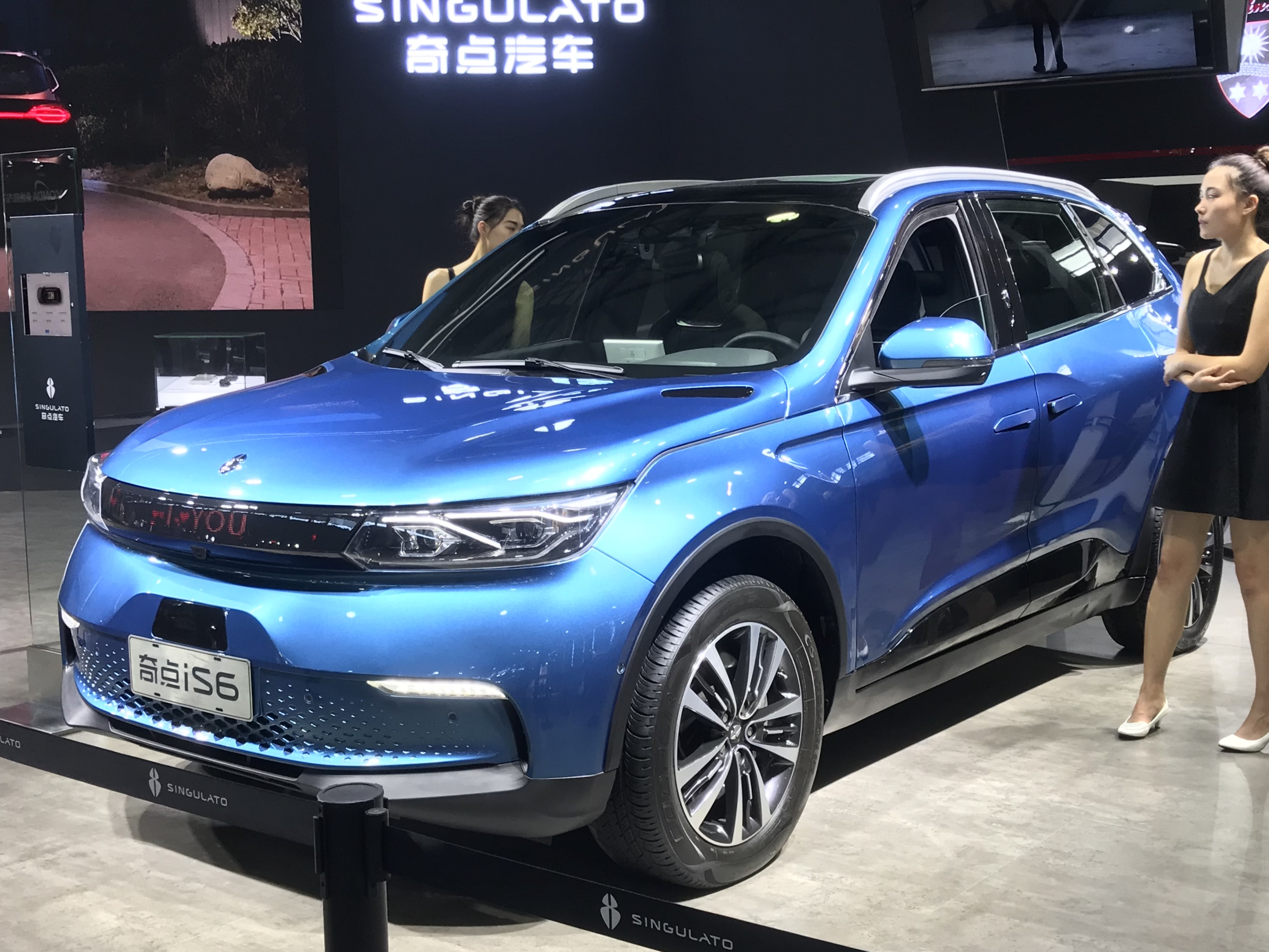

Overview
- Manufacturer: Singulato
- Production: 2019–2023
- Assembly: China: Suzhou

Body and chassis
- Class: Mid-size crossover SUV
- Body style: 5-door SUV
- Layout: Two Motors 4WD
- Doors: Conventional doors (front); Coach Doors with Falcon-wing doors (rear)

Powertrain
- Electric motor: Permanent Magnet Motor Dual Motor AWD 348 hp, 580 Nm
- Electric range: 400 kilometers (NEDC)

Dimensions
- Wheelbase: 116.5 in (2,960 mm)
- Length: 190.9 in (4,850 mm)
- Width: 76.8 in (1,950 mm)
- Height: 1,750 mm (69 in)

The Singulato iS6 is a battery electric mid-size crossover SUV produced by Singulato, a brand from a Chinese start-up based in Beijing called Zhiche Auto. Small batch production started in late 2017 with mass production planned, as of April 2017, to start in mid 2018, with prices planned to be from 200,000 to 300,000 yuan ($30,000 – 43,000).

== Overview ==
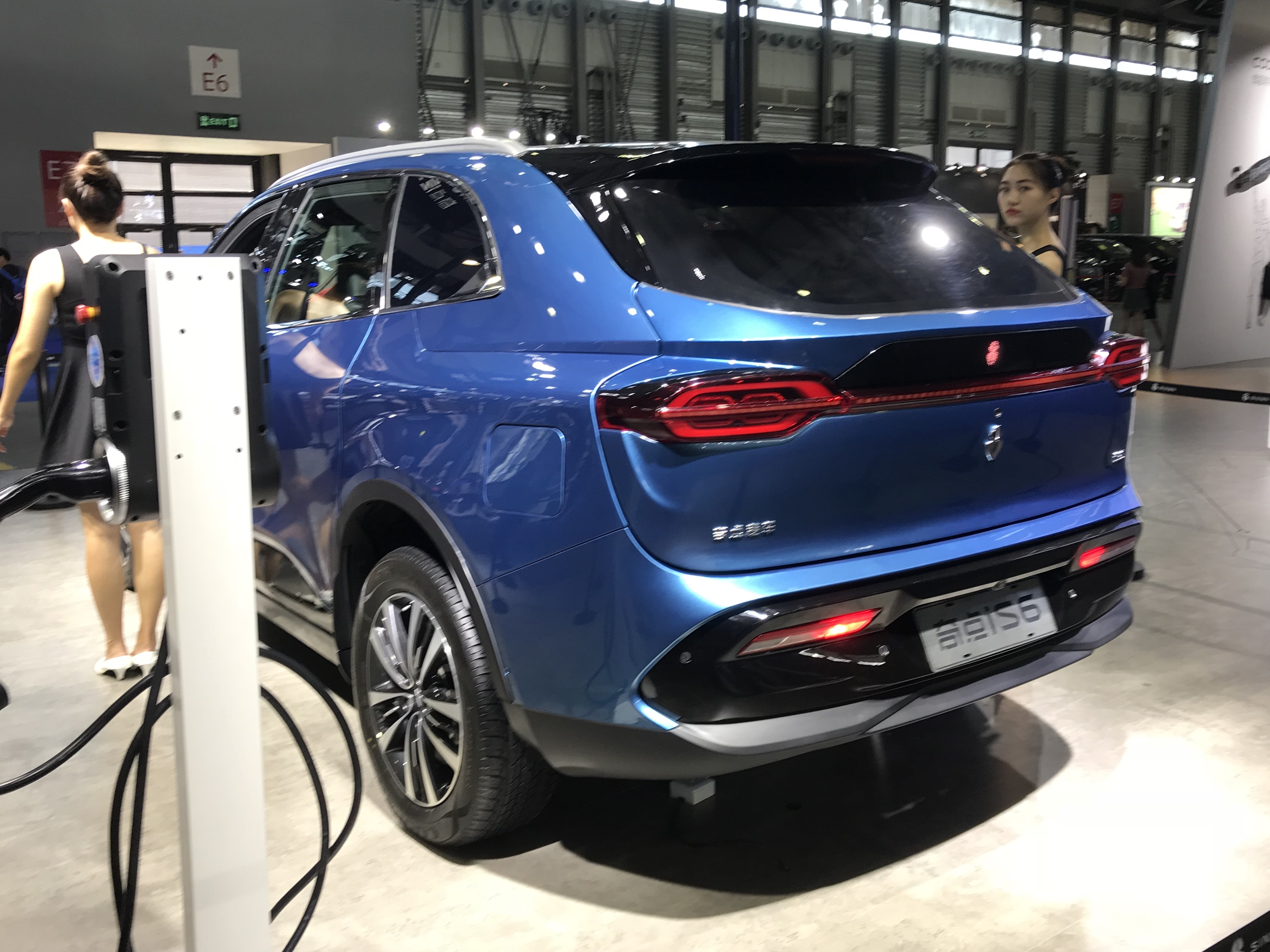
Singulato iS6 rear

The Singulato iS6 was introduced during the Shanghai Auto Show by Singulato, with the production version of the iS6 electric SUV debuting on the 2018 Beijing Auto Show.

Singulato claims that the Singulato iS6 has a range of 400 kilometers, and is capable of accelerating from 0 to 100 km/h in four seconds. The battery pack consists of 18650 lithium ion batteries which is enough for 320 kilometers of range after a one-hour charge on a fast-charger. The is6 has two electric motors with a combined output of 348 hp and 580 Nm.

The production Singulato iS6 is semi-autonomous or Level 2 autonomous with various driver-assistance systems such as adaptive cruise control, lane-departure warning, and automatic parking. A Level 3 autonomous version will be launched late 2018, while the fully autonomous version will be launched in 2020. Starting from 2017, buyers can reserve their Singulato iS6. Singulato will offer a five-seat and a seven-seat versions of the iS6.

=== Sales ===
Production of the Singulato iS6 for the domestic Chinese market was to start in the year of release, 2018, However, in November this year, the manufacturer announced a delay and postponement to 2019. This deadline was also not met, and the company was unable to find a contractor for production for another two years. After the failure, it declared bankruptcy in 2023, and the iS6 never hit the market.

=== Technical data ===
The Singulato iS6 electric drive consisted of two engines with a total power of 349 HP and a maximum torque of 580 Nm. The range on one vehicle charge is 400 kilometers.
