= Singulato =

Chinese automobile manufacturer

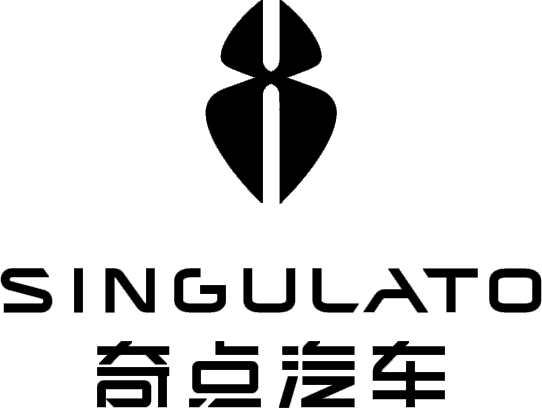
- Type: Private Co. Ltd.
- Industry: Automotive
- Founded: 2014
- Defunct: 2023
- Headquarters: Beijing, People's Republic of China
- Area served: Mainland China
- Key people: Shen Haiyin
- Products: Automobiles
- Website: www.singulato.com

Singulato Motors was the new energy vehicle brand of Chi Che-hung Technology Co., Ltd. Singulato was founded in December 2014 in Beijing as an internet company to produce premium Chinese new energy vehicles. Singulato Motors aimed to develop new energy vehicles (NEV), autonomous driving systems, automotive networking services with a focus on big data development and cloud computing technologies.

In April 2016, Singulato introduced its first EV product, the mid-size Singulato iS6 electric SUV. Singulato started plans for small batch production in the end of 2017 and mass production started by March 2018. The Singulato iS6 electric SUV was priced between ¥200,000 and ¥300,000. In October 2016, Anhui Singulato Intelligent New Energy Vehicle Co., Ltd. was established, jointly held by Zhiche Youxing Technology (Shanghai) Co., Ltd. and Jiangren Automotive Technology (Beijing) Co., Ltd.

== History ==
At the end of 2014, the Chinese company Zhiche Youxing Technology Co., Ltd., managed by entrepreneur Shen Haiyin, established startup Singulato Motors in the capital Beijing. Filia focused on developing a range of self-design electric cars, competing with similar start-ups in China. In addition, Singulato is also working on developing autonomous vehicle technology and big data.

In February 2018, Singulato announced its model plans to design and introduce 6 electric cars for the domestic Chinese market over the next few years. In April, the manufacturer announced that it had obtained funds equivalent to USD 2.4 billion to implement the first serial model iS6, whose official premiere took place at the Beijing Auto Show 2018 a month later.

In parallel with the launch of the iS6, Singulato presented the iM8 Concept prototype illustrating its vision of the autonomous minivan of the future. In April 2018, Singulato presented another iC3 study, this time showing a small, two-seater electric car using the Toyota body design from the iQ.

The ambitious plans could not be implemented, including the implementation of the iS6 model into production, which was not possible either in 2018, 2019 or 2021. Singulato has financing about 17 billion RMB, and it has been questioned that it cannot build cars, relies on selling software to make a living, and is insolvent. In 2022, the company was exposed to the problem of employees demanding wages. On 26 June 2023, the Intermediate People's Court of Tongling City, Anhui Province decided to accept the bankruptcy and liquidation case of Singulato, and on 30 June designated Tongling Jinjian Accounting Firm as the administrator of Anhui Singulato Intelligent New Energy Vehicle Co., Ltd.

The failed company finally filed for bankruptcy in July 2023.

== Products ==
Current product includes the following:

- Singulato iS6 – electric mid-size crossover SUV
- Singulato iM8 – (concept) electric MPV
- Singulato iC3 – (concept) electric city car based on the Toyota iQ
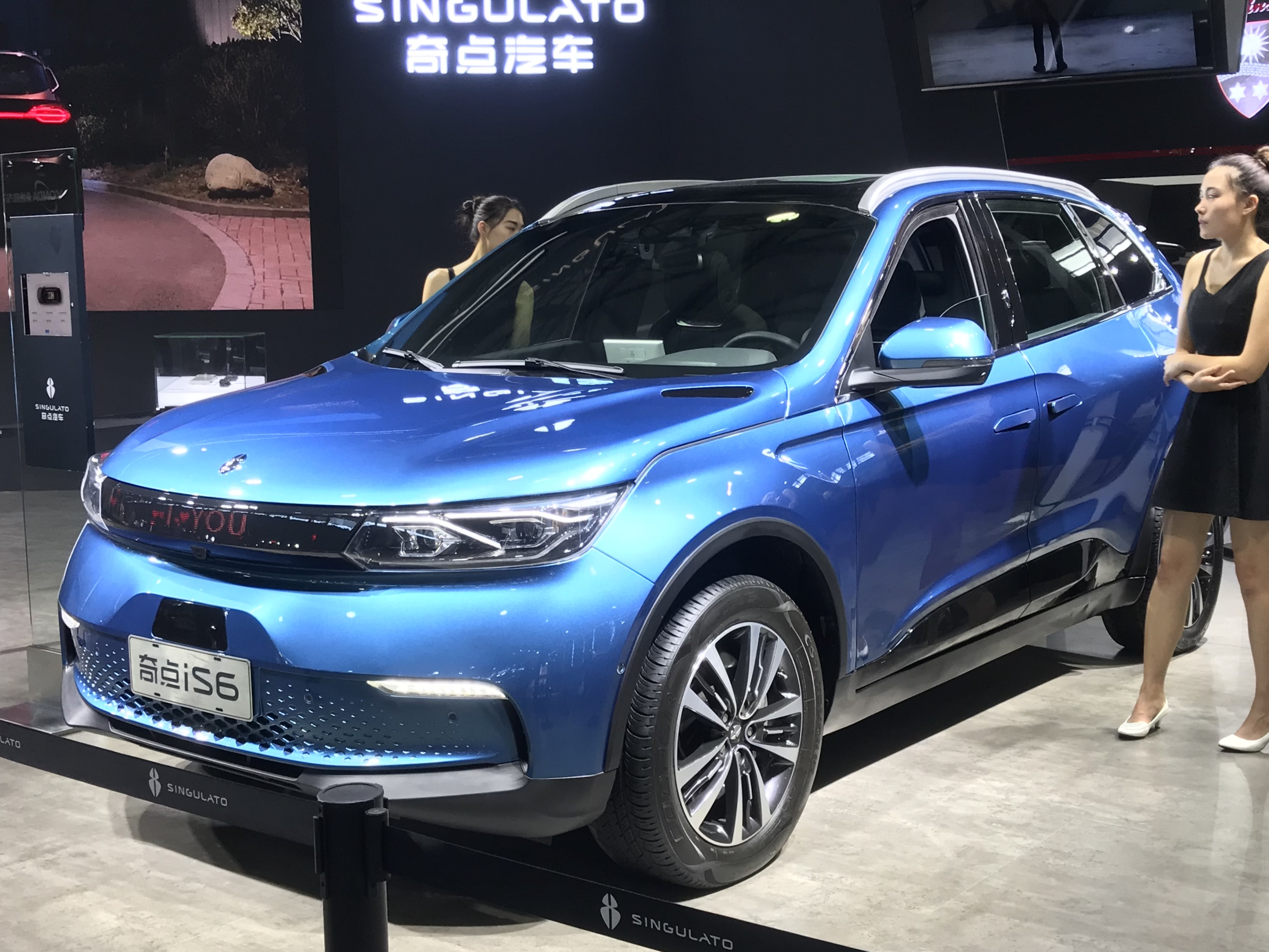
Singulato iS6

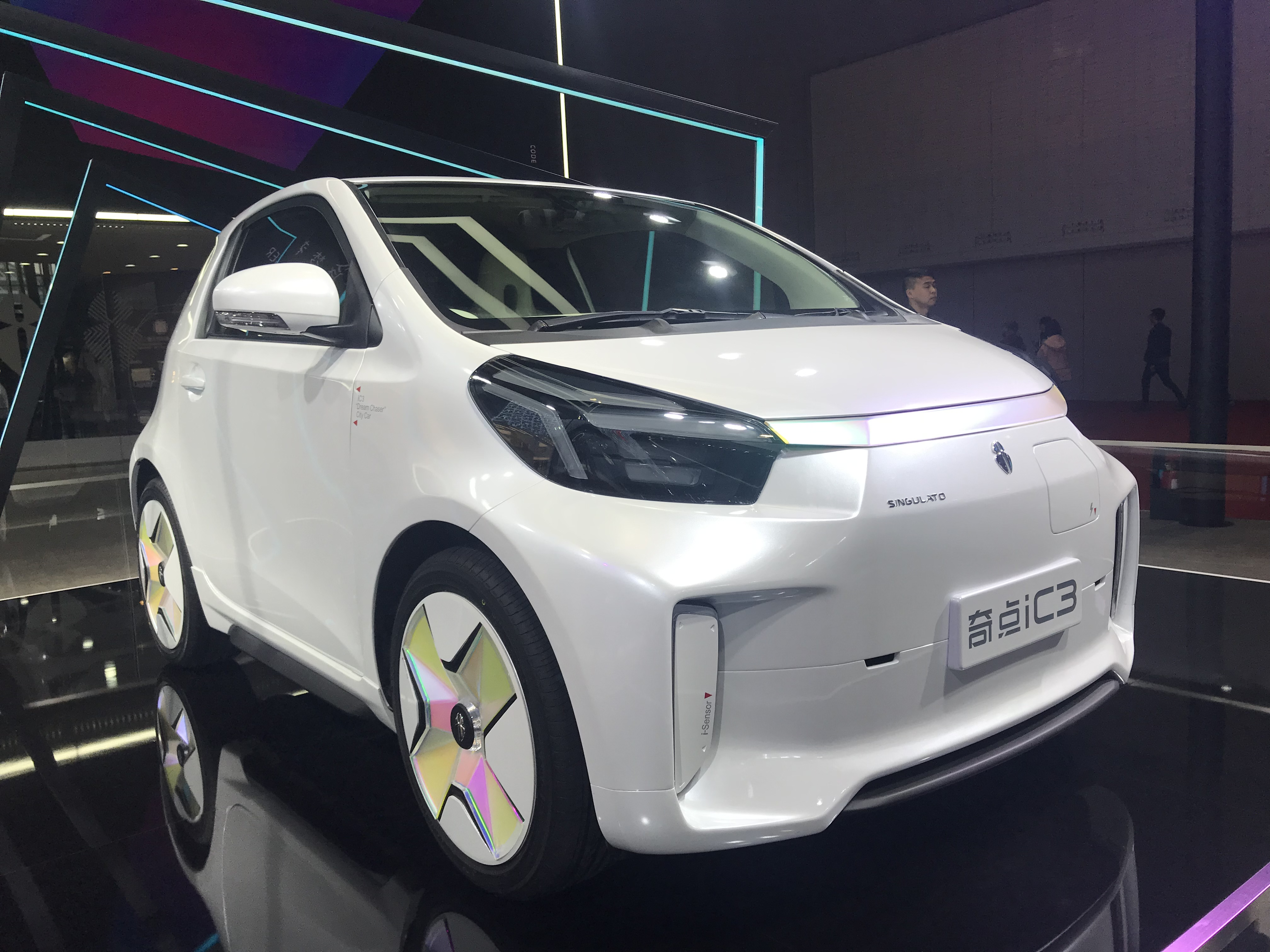
Singulato iC3
