= List of Proton vehicles =

The following is a list of Proton vehicles, including past, present, and concept nameplates.

Perusahaan Otomobil Nasional (Proton) was established in May 1983 through a joint-venture between The Heavy Industries Corporation Of Malaysia (HICOM) and Mitsubishi Motors Corporation (MMC).

Proton produced its first car, the Saga in July 1985, and its first indigenously designed car, the Waja in May 2000. Since the 2000s, Proton has produced a mix of indigenously designed and rebadged models.

== Current nameplates ==
This is a list of current Proton nameplates in decreasing order from date of introduction by body style popularity.

Exported vehicles Vehicles exclusive to Malaysia

List of current Proton nameplates
Model	Doors	Platform	Size		Powertrain		Assembly	Alias
Model	Doors	Platform	Segment	Wheelbase	Engine	Transmission	Assembly	Alias
Sedans
Proton Saga (AMA01) 2025–present	4-doors	Proton AMA	A	2,465 mm	1.5 L BHE15PFI PFI	4AT CVT	Malaysia	
Proton S70 (SS11) 2023–present	4-doors	Geely BMA	C	2,650 mm	1.5 L JLH-3G15T PFI I3 1.5 L BHE15PFI PFI	7-speed DCT CVT	Malaysia	
Sports Utility Vehicle
Proton eMas 7 (E245) 2024–present	5-doors	Geely GEA	C	2,750 mm			Malaysia	
Proton eMas 7 PHEV (P145) 2026–present	5-doors	Geely GEA	C	2,755 mm			Malaysia	
Proton X50 (DG2F) 2020–present	5-doors	Geely BMA	B	2,600 mm	1.5 L JLH-3G15TD T-GDi I3 1.5 L JLH-3G15T PFI I3	7-speed DCT	Malaysia	
Proton X70 (NL2E, NL3E) 2018–present	5-doors	Geely NL	C	2,670 mm	1.8 L 4G18TBD T-GDi I3 1.5 L JLH-3G15TD T-GDi I3	7-speed DCT	Malaysia	
Proton X90 (VX11) 2023–present	5-doors	Geely CV	D	2,805 mm	1.5 L 3G15TDB G-Power I3	7-speed DCT	Malaysia	
Hatchback
Proton eMas 5 (E22H) 2025–present	5-doors	Geely GEA	B	2,650 mm			China	

== Discontinued nameplates ==
This is a list of discontinued Proton nameplates in decreasing order from date of introduction by body style popularity.

Exported vehicles Vehicles exclusive to Malaysia

List of discontinued Proton nameplates
Model	Doors	Platform	Size		Powertrain		Assembly	Alias
Model	Doors	Platform	Segment	Wheelbase	Engine	Transmission	Assembly	Alias
Sedans
Proton Saga (BT3S) 2016–2025	4-doors	Proton BT	A	2,465 mm	1.3L S4PE VVT	4AT 5MT	Malaysia Bangladesh Kenya Pakistan	
Proton Persona (BH6S) 2016–2026	4-doors	Proton BH	B	2,555 mm	1.6L S4PH VVT	CVT	Malaysia	
Proton Perdana (CP1S, CP2S) 2013–2020	4-doors	Honda CP	D	2,800 mm	2.0L R20A3 2.4L K24Z2	5AT	Malaysia	
Proton Prevé (CR6S) 2012–2018	4-doors	Proton P2	C	2,650 mm	1.6L S4PH IAFM+ 1.6L S4PH CFE / Turbo	5MT CVT	Malaysia Bangladesh	
Proton Saga FLX (BT3S, BT6S) 2011–2016	4-doors	Proton BT	B	2,465 mm	1.3L S4PE IAFM+ 1.6L S4PH IAFM+	5MT CVT	Malaysia	Proton S16 FLX
Proton Inspira (CY3S, CY4S) 2010–2015	4-doors	Mitsubishi GS	C	2,635 mm	1.8L 4B10 2.0L 4B11	5MT CVT	Malaysia	
Proton Saga (BT3S, BT6S) 2008–2010	4-doors	Proton BT	B	2,465 mm	1.3L S4PE IAFM 1.6L S4PH IAFM	5MT 4AT	Malaysia	Proton S16
Proton Persona (CM6S) 2007–2016	4-doors	Proton CM	C	2,600 mm	1.6L S4PH 1.6L S4PH IAFM	5MT 4AT	Malaysia China	Proton Persona CNG
Proton Waja (CF1S) 2000–2011	4-doors	Mitsubishi DA / Volvo X40	C	2,600 mm	1.6L 4G18P 1.6L S4PH 1.6L S4PH CPS 1.8L F4P	5MT 4AT	Malaysia	Proton Impian
Proton Perdana V6 (E54A, E55A) 1998–2010	4-doors	Mitsubishi E50	D	2,635 mm	2.0L 6A12	4AT	Malaysia	
Proton Perdana (E54A, E55A) 1995–1998	4-doors	Mitsubishi E50	D	2,635 mm	2.0L 4G63P	5MT 4AT	Malaysia	
Proton Wira (C95S, C96S, C97S, C98S, C99S) 1993–2009	4-doors	Mitsubishi CB	C	2,500 mm	1.3L 4G13P 1.5L 4G15P 1.5L 4G91x 1.6L 4G92P 1.8L 4G93P 2.0L 4D68x	5MT 3AT 4AT	Malaysia Indonesia Iran Philippines Vietnam	Proton Persona Proton 400 Series Proton Natura Proton Sembilu
Proton Saga Iswara (C21A, C22A) 1992–2006	4-doors	Mitsubishi C10	B	2,380 mm	1.3L 4G13P 1.5L 4G15P	5MT 3AT	Malaysia	Proton Mpi Proton Iswara
Proton Saga (C21A, C22A) 1985–1992	4-doors	Mitsubishi C10	B	2,380 mm	1.3L 4G13P 1.5L 4G15P	5MT 3AT	Malaysia	Proton 1.3 Proton 1.5 Proton 12-Valve
Coupé
Proton Putra (C99D) 1996–2004	2-doors	Mitsubishi CC	C	2,440 mm	1.8L 4G93P	5MT 4AT	Malaysia	Proton Persona Coupé Proton Coupé Proton M21
Multi Purpose Vehicles
Proton Ertiga (EZ5Y) 2016–2019	5-doors	Suzuki ZC	B	2,740 mm	1.4L K14B	5MT 4AT	Malaysia	
Proton Exora (FZ6Y) 2009–2023	5-doors	Proton P2	C	2,730 mm	1.6L S4PH CPS 1.6L S4PH CFE / Turbo	5MT 4AT CVT	Malaysia	
Proton Juara (U66W) 2001–2003	5-doors	Mitsubishi Town Box Wide	A	2,390 mm	1.1L 4A31	4AT	Malaysia	Proton RGW
Pickup
Proton Arena (C97P) 2002–2010	2-doors	Mitsubishi CB	C	2,600 mm	1.5L 4G15P	5MT	Malaysia	Proton Jumbuck
Hatchbacks
Proton Iriz (BH3L, BH6L) 2014–2025	5-doors	Proton BH	B	2,555 mm	1.3L S4PE VVT 1.6L S4PH VVT	CVT	Malaysia	
Proton Suprima S (CR6L) 2013–2019	5-doors	Proton P2	C	2,650 mm	1.6L S4PH CFE / Turbo	CVT	Malaysia	
Proton Satria Neo (BS3M, BS6M) 2006–2015	3-doors	Proton BS	B	2,440 mm	1.3L S4PE 1.6L S4PH 1.6L S4PH CPS	5MT 4AT	Malaysia	Proton Neo
Proton Savvy (BT2L) 2005–2011	5-doors	Proton BT	A	2,395 mm	1.2L D4F	5MT AMT	Malaysia	
Proton GEN•2 (CM3L, CM6L) 2004–2012	5-doors	Proton CM	C	2,600 mm	1.3L S4PE 1.6L S4PH 1.6L S4PH IAFM 1.6L S4PH CPS	5MT 4AT	Malaysia China Iran	
Proton Saga LMST (C21A, C22A) 2003–2008	5-doors	Mitsubishi C10	B	2,380 mm	1.3L 4G13P	5MT	Malaysia	
Proton Satria GTi (C99M) 1998–2005	3-doors	Mitsubishi CA	C	2,440 mm	1.8L 4G93P	5MT	Malaysia	
Proton Tiara (B31L) 1996–2000	5-doors	Citroën AX	A	2,290 mm	1.1L TU1x	MT	Malaysia	
Proton Satria (C96M, C97M, C98M) 1994–2006	3-doors	Mitsubishi CA	C	2,440 mm	1.3L 4G13P 1.5L 4G15P 1.6L 4G92P	5MT 3AT 4AT	Malaysia	Proton Compact Proton Persona Compact Proton 300 Series
Proton Wira Aeroback (C95L, C96L, C97L, C98L, C99L) 1993–2009	5-doors	Mitsubishi CB	C	2,500 mm	1.3L 4G13P 1.5L 4G15P 1.5L 4G91x 1.6L 4G92P 1.8L 4G93P 2.0L 4D68x	5MT 3AT 4AT	Malaysia Indonesia Iran Philippines Vietnam	Proton Persona
Proton Saga Iswara Aeroback (C21A, C22A) 1992–2003	5-doors	Mitsubishi C10	B	2,380 mm	1.3L 4G13P 1.5L 4G15P	5MT 3AT	Malaysia	Proton Mpi Proton Iswara
Proton Saga Aeroback (C21A, C22A) 1987–1992	5-doors	Mitsubishi C10	B	2,380 mm	1.3L 4G13P 1.5L 4G15P	5MT 3AT	Malaysia	Proton 1.3 Proton 1.5

== Concept nameplates ==
This is a list of concept Proton nameplates in decreasing order from date of introduction by body style popularity.

List of concept Proton nameplates
Model	Doors	Platform	Size		Powertrain		Assembly	Alias
Model	Doors	Platform	Segment	Wheelbase	Engine	Transmission	Assembly	Alias
Sedans
Proton Prevé Sapphire 2012	4-doors	Proton P2	C	2,650 mm	(?)	(?)	Malaysia	Proton Prevé
Proton Persona REEV 2011	4-doors	Proton CM	C	2,600 mm	(?)	(?)	Malaysia	Proton Persona
Proton Saga EV 2011	4-doors	Proton BT	B	2,465 mm	(?)	(?)	Malaysia	Proton Saga
Proton Tuah 2010	4-doors	Proton P2	C	2,650mm	(?)	(?)	Malaysia	Proton Prevé
Proton Jebat 2010	4-doors	Mitsubishi GS	C	2,635 mm	2.0L MIVEC 4B11T DOHC I4	5MT CVT	Malaysia	Proton Inspira
Proton Saga R3 2010	4-doors	Proton BT	B	2,465 mm	(?)	(?)	Malaysia	Proton Saga
Proton Kasturi 2010	4-doors	Proton BT	B	2,465 mm	(?)	(?)	Malaysia	Proton Saga
Proton Persona Envy 2007	4-doors	Proton CM	C	2,600 mm	(?)	(?)	Malaysia	Proton Persona
Coupé
Proton Lekir 2011	2-doors	Lotus Elise Series 2	S	2,337 mm	1.8L Rover K-series 18K4F I4	4MT 5MT 6MT	Malaysia	Lotus Europa S
Cabriolet
Proton Satria Cabriolet 1997	2-doors	Mitsubishi CA	C	2,440 mm	(?)	(?)	Malaysia	Proton Satria
Sports Utility Vehicle
Proton Lekiu 2010	5-doors	Proton P2	B	(?)	(?)	(?)	Malaysia	Proton Exora
Multi Purpose Vehicles
Proton Exora REEV 2011	5-doors	Proton P2	C	2,730 mm	(?)	(?)	Malaysia	Proton Exora
Hatchback
Proton Artiga 2012	3-doors	Proton BS	B	2,440 mm	(?)	(?)	Malaysia	Proton Satria Neo
Proton Satria Neo R3 S2000 2012	3-doors	Proton BS	B	2,440 mm	(?)	(?)	Malaysia	Proton Satria Neo
Proton Satria Neo R3 2011	3-doors	Proton BS	B	2,440 mm	(?)	(?)	Malaysia	Proton Satria Neo
Proton EMAS 2010	3-doors 5-doors	Toyota iQ	A	2,600 mm	1.2L three-cylinder flex-fuel capable gasoline	(?)	Malaysia	Proton Iriz
Proton Satria Neo Desire 2008	3-doors	Proton BS	B	2,440 mm	(?)	(?)	Malaysia	Proton Satria Neo
Proton Satria Neo Symphony 2008	3-doors	Proton BS	B	2,440 mm	(?)	(?)	Malaysia	Proton Satria Neo
Proton Savvy R3 2005	5-doors	Proton BT	A	2,395 mm	(?)	(?)	Malaysia	Proton Savvy
