= Proton Lekiu =

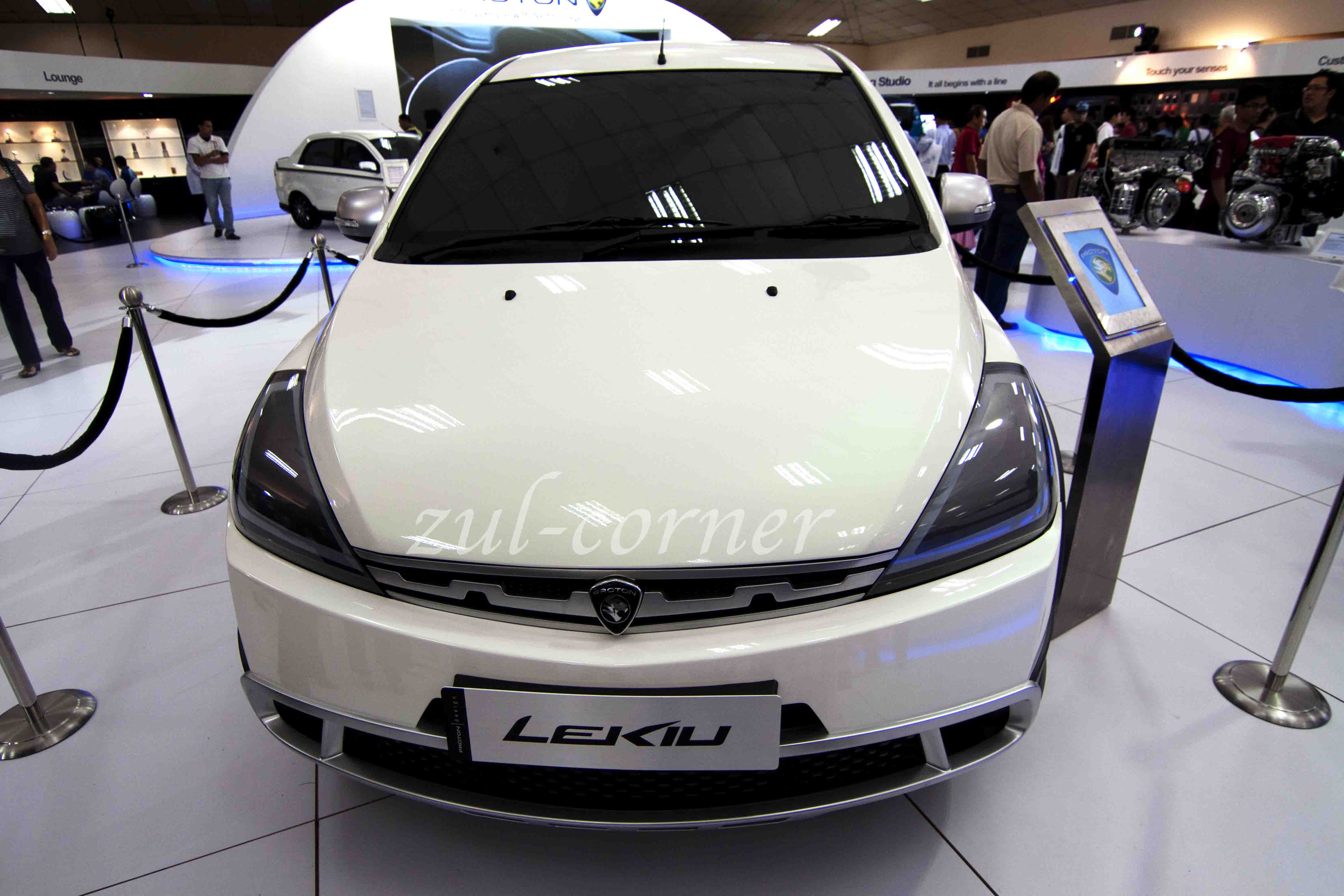

Overview
- Manufacturer: Proton
- Production: 2010 (concept car)

Body and chassis
- Class: Compact SUV
- Body style: 5-door wagon
- Platform: Proton P2
- Related: Proton Exora

The Proton Lekiu is a series of concept SUV produced by the Malaysian automobile manufacturer, Proton. It was first displayed at the 2010 Kuala Lumpur International Motor Show (KLIMS 2010).

== Etymology ==
The name "Lekiu" refers to a legendary warrior from Malacca called Hang Lekiu. The car is a member of the Pahlawan series of Proton's concept cars, which are named after warriors.

== Specifications ==
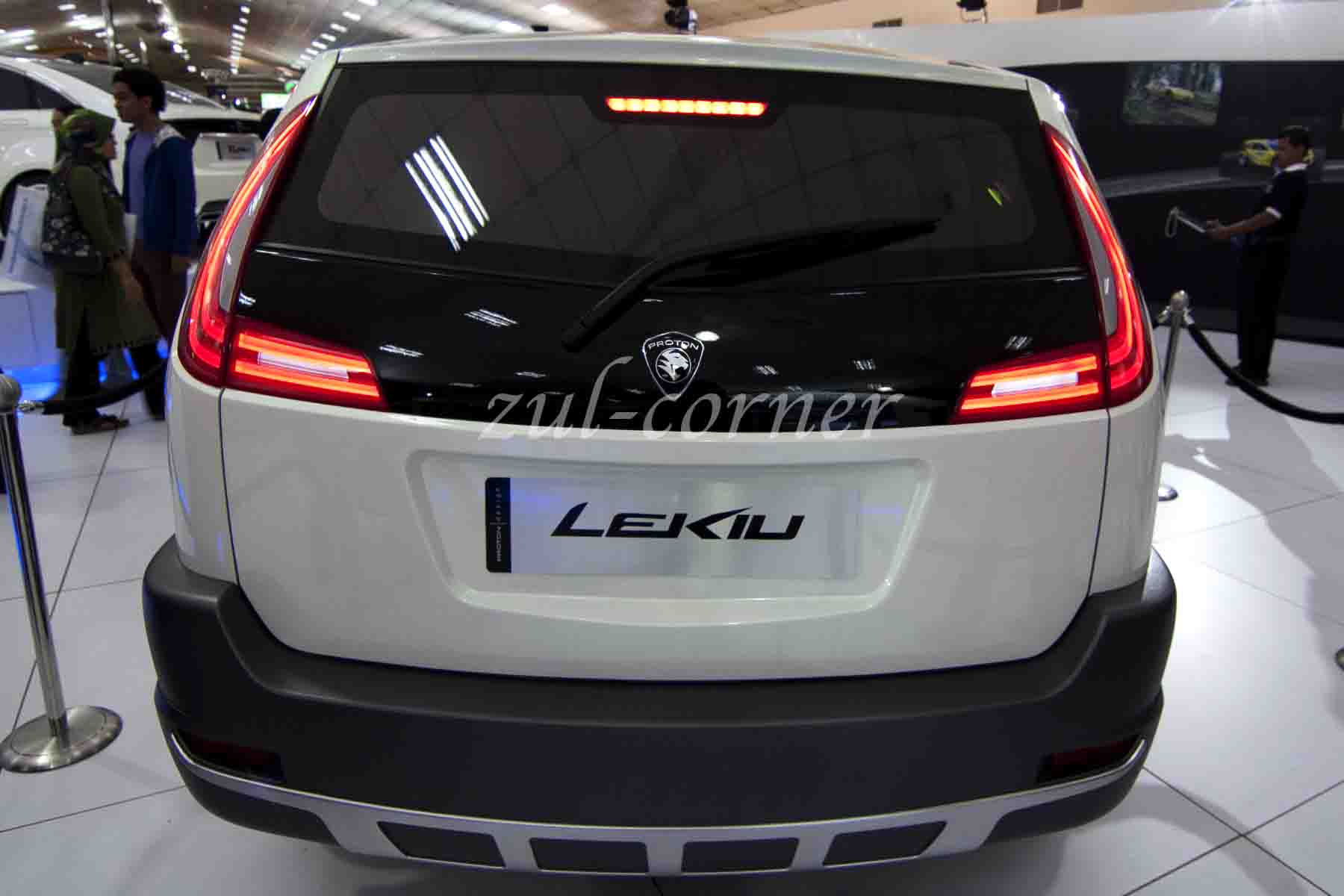
Rear view

It was based on the Proton Exora MPV, but with some cosmetic modifications on it. This includes a slightly revamped front grille, front and rear bumpers, head and tail lights, and a completely redesigned tailgate. Fresh to the car was the newly-designed alloy wheels, which featured 14 spokes. It shared the same platform as the Exora, but the suspension was raised to give the Lekiu a more offroading-oriented outlook.

== See also ==
- Proton Exora
- Proton Jebat
- Proton EMAS
