= Proton EMAS =

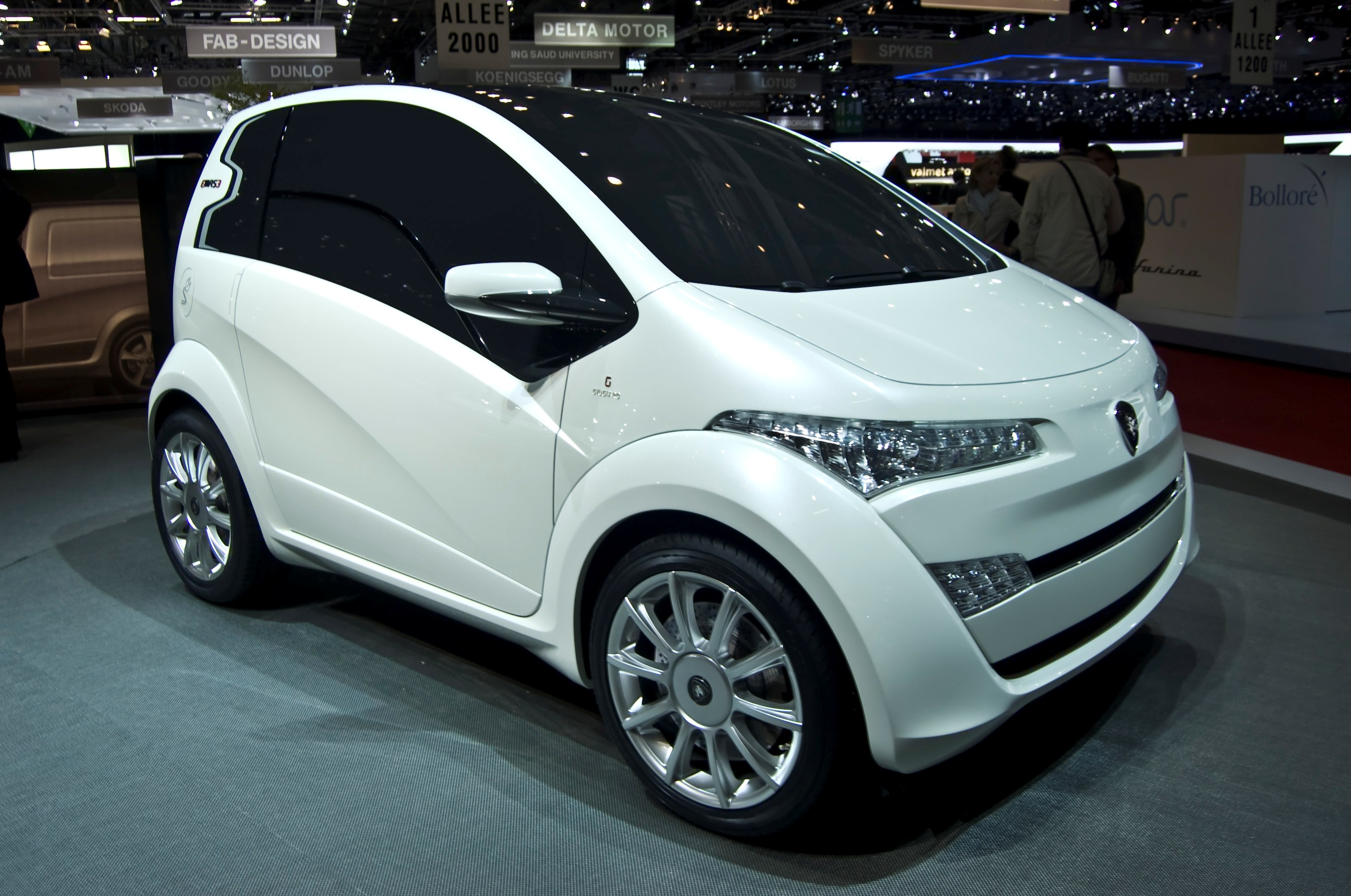
- Proton EMAS3 front View

Overview
- Manufacturer: Proton
- Production: 2010 (concept car)
- Designer: Italdesign Giugiaro

Body and chassis
- Class: City car
- Body style: 3 door and 5 door hatchback
- Layout: FF
- Platform: Toyota iQ (modified)
- Related: Lotus Ethos, Proton Iriz

Powertrain
- Engine: 1.2 liter three-cylinder flex-fuel capable gasoline

Dimensions
- Wheelbase: 2,600 mm (102.4 in) interior
- Length: 3,555 mm (140.0 in) interior
- Width: 1,699 mm (66.9 in) interior
- Height: 1,576 mm (62.0 in) interior
- Curb weight: 1400 kg

Proton EMAS is a range of concept cars designed by Italdesign Giugiaro and developed by Proton. It debuted at the 2010 Geneva Motor Show as a hybrid vehicle.

"EMAS" is an acronym for Eco Mobility Advance Solution. The word "emas" means "gold" in Malay.

Proton EMAS was planned to be Malaysia's and Proton's first global car and was expected to be in production by 2012. As of August 2014 the concept car had not reached production.

Proton's subsidiary Lotus Cars has shown a plug-in hybrid city concept car based on the EMAS named the Lotus Ethos.

== Specifications ==
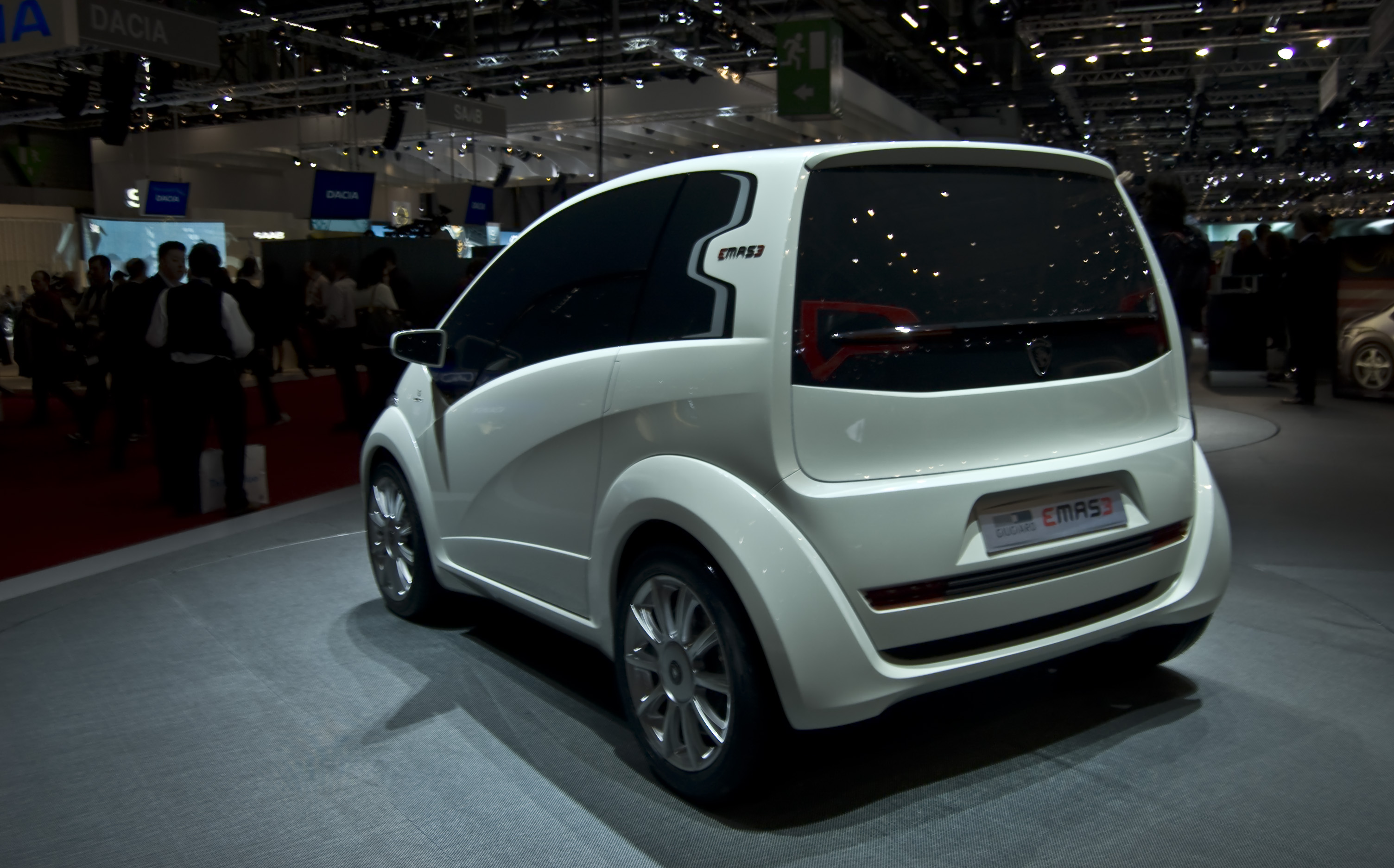
Proton EMAS3 rear view

The EMAS is built on a heavily revised Toyota iQ platform including suspension and steering but everything else is new. Its 16.5 kWh electric battery is supplemented by a range extender engine from Lotus Engineering; this is a 1.2 liter 3-cylinder single-cam 4 valves per cylinder engine that weighs only 56 kg dry and is optimized for 2 RPM points – 20 hp at 1,500rpm and 47 hp at 3,500rpm. Peak torque is 107Nm at 2,500rpm. The batteries are 100 X 31 Ahr Cells, 370 volts.

The EMAS can accelerate to 60 mph in 14 seconds and a maximum speed of 105 mph. Its full range is 350 miles and CO_{2} emissions of 60 g/km. It sits on 18" wheels with 215/45 tyres with MacPherson strut suspension at the front and rear with torsion beam.

== Gallery ==
=== Proton EMAS ===
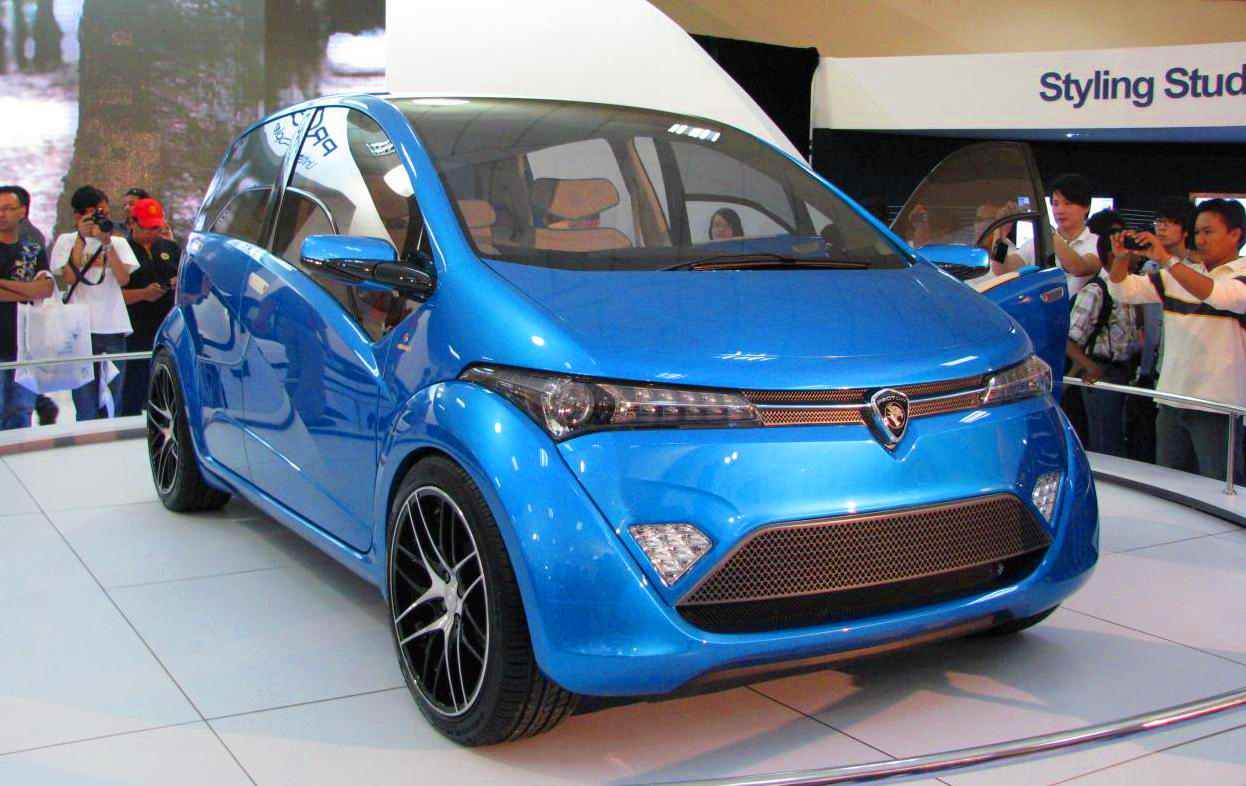
Front View

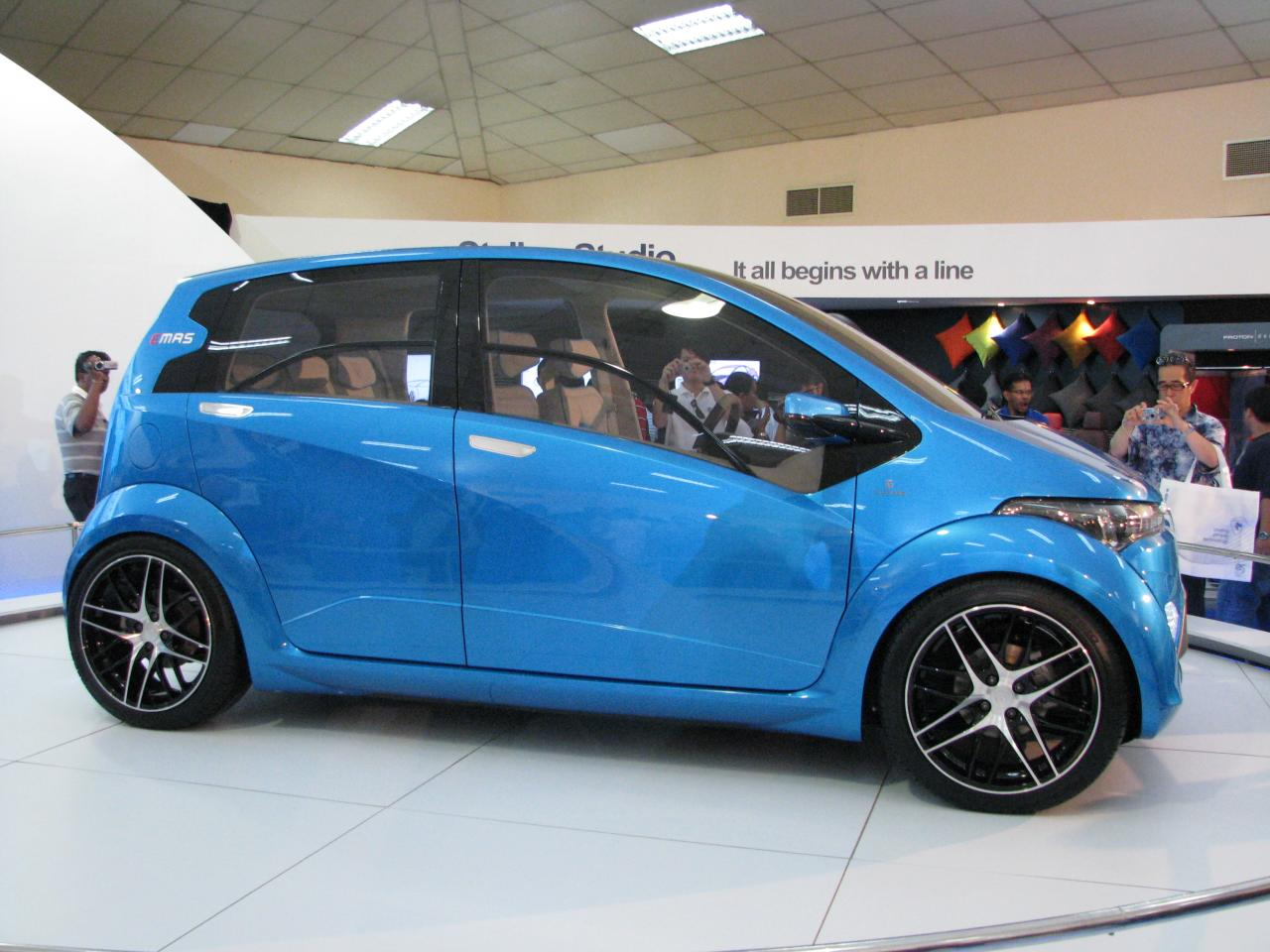
Side View

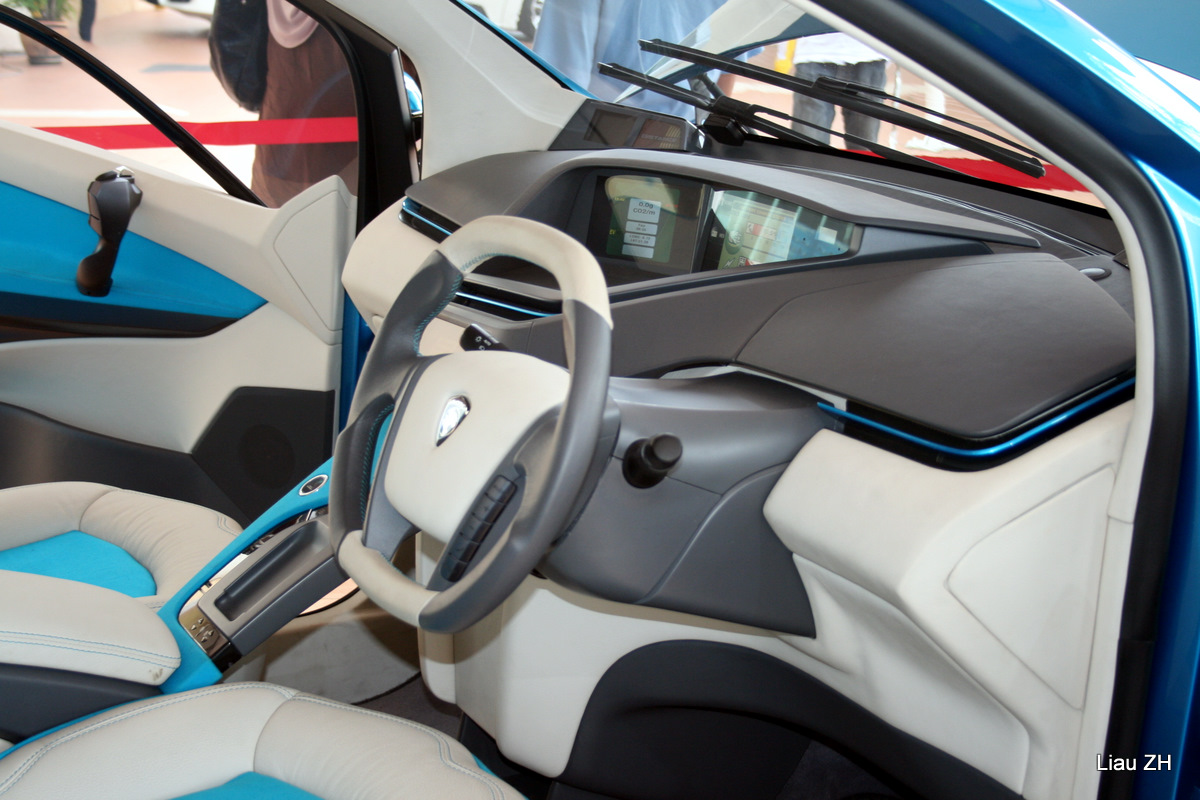
Interior view

=== Proton EMAS3 ===
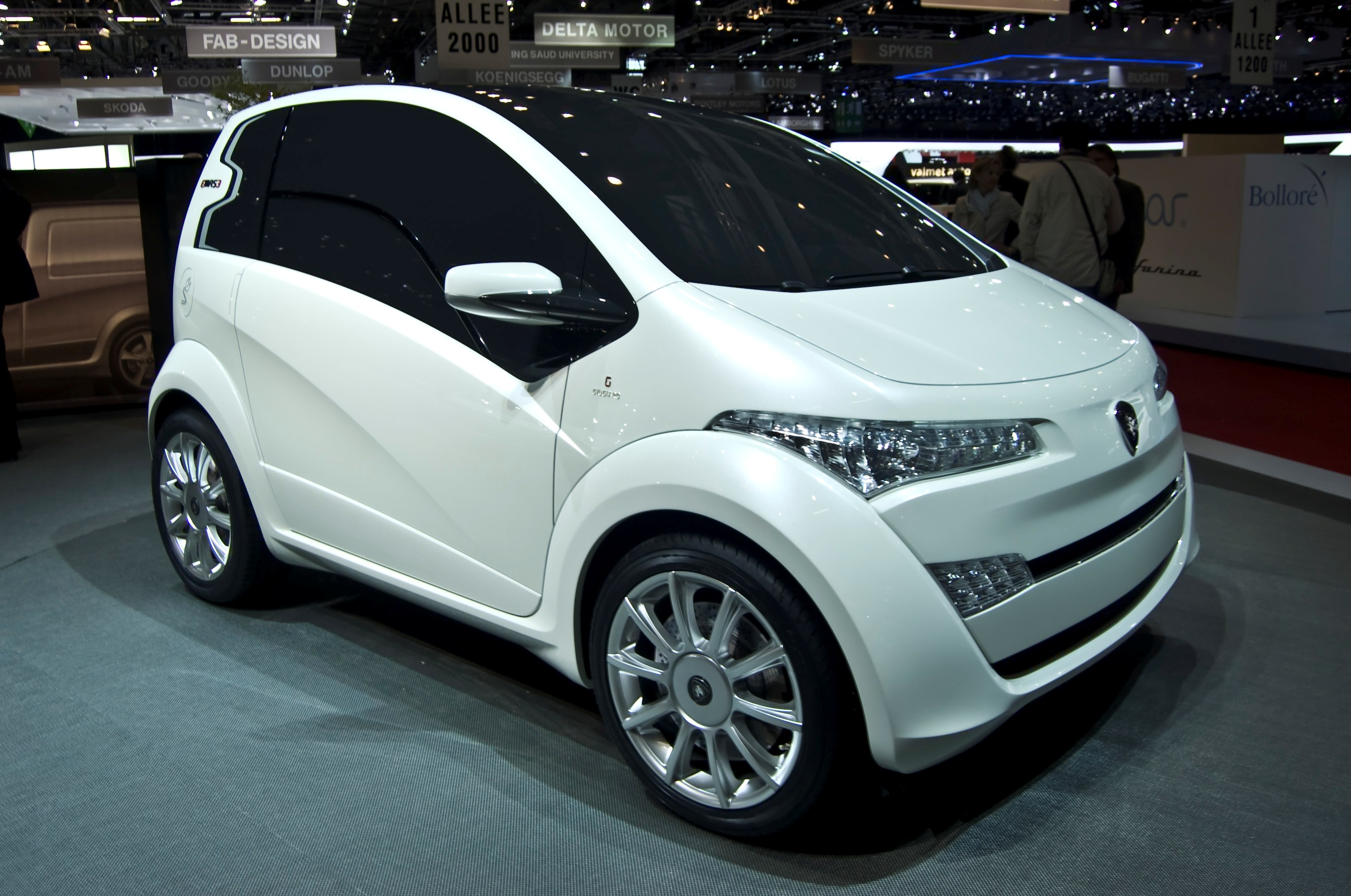
Front view

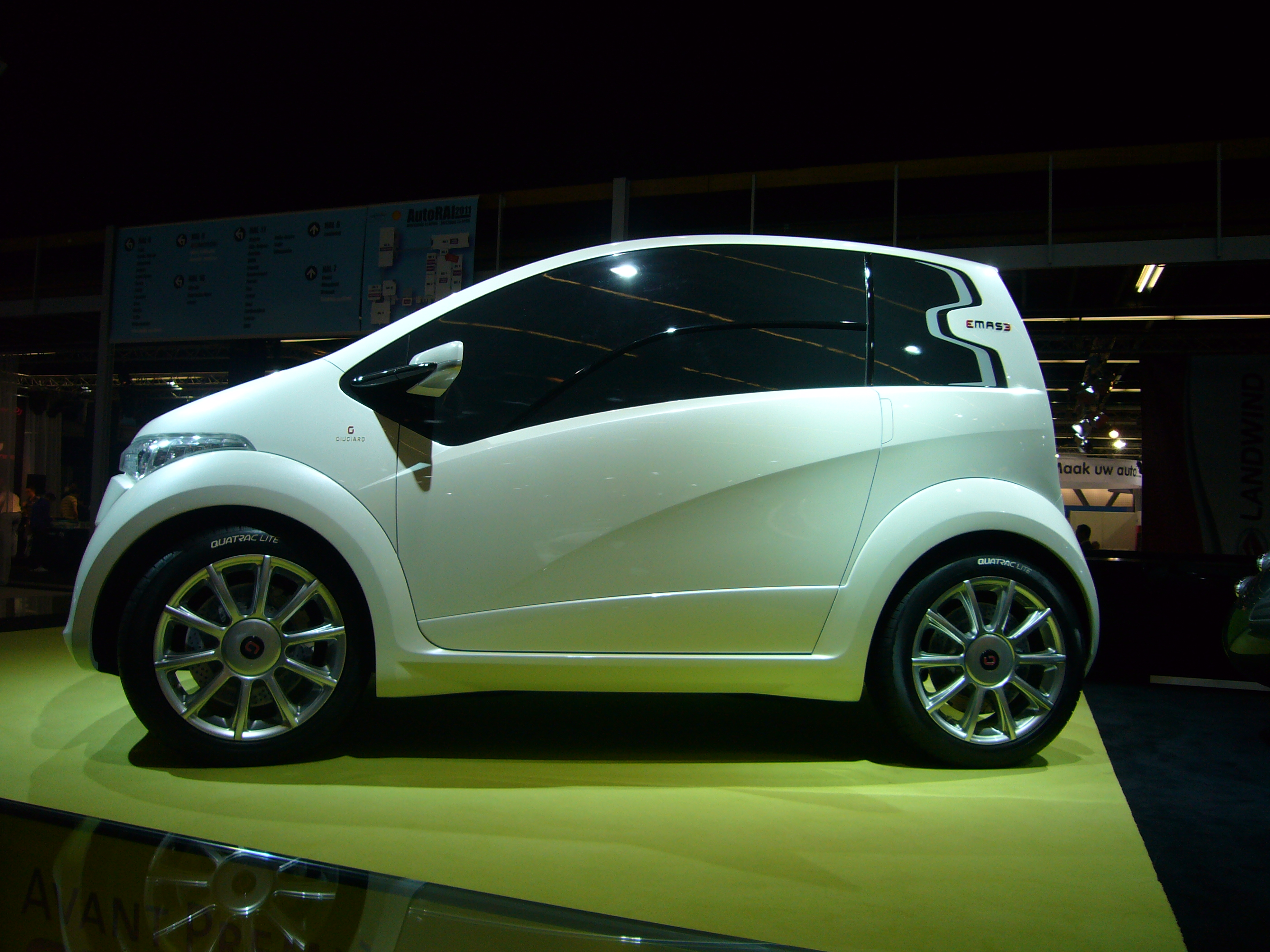
Side view

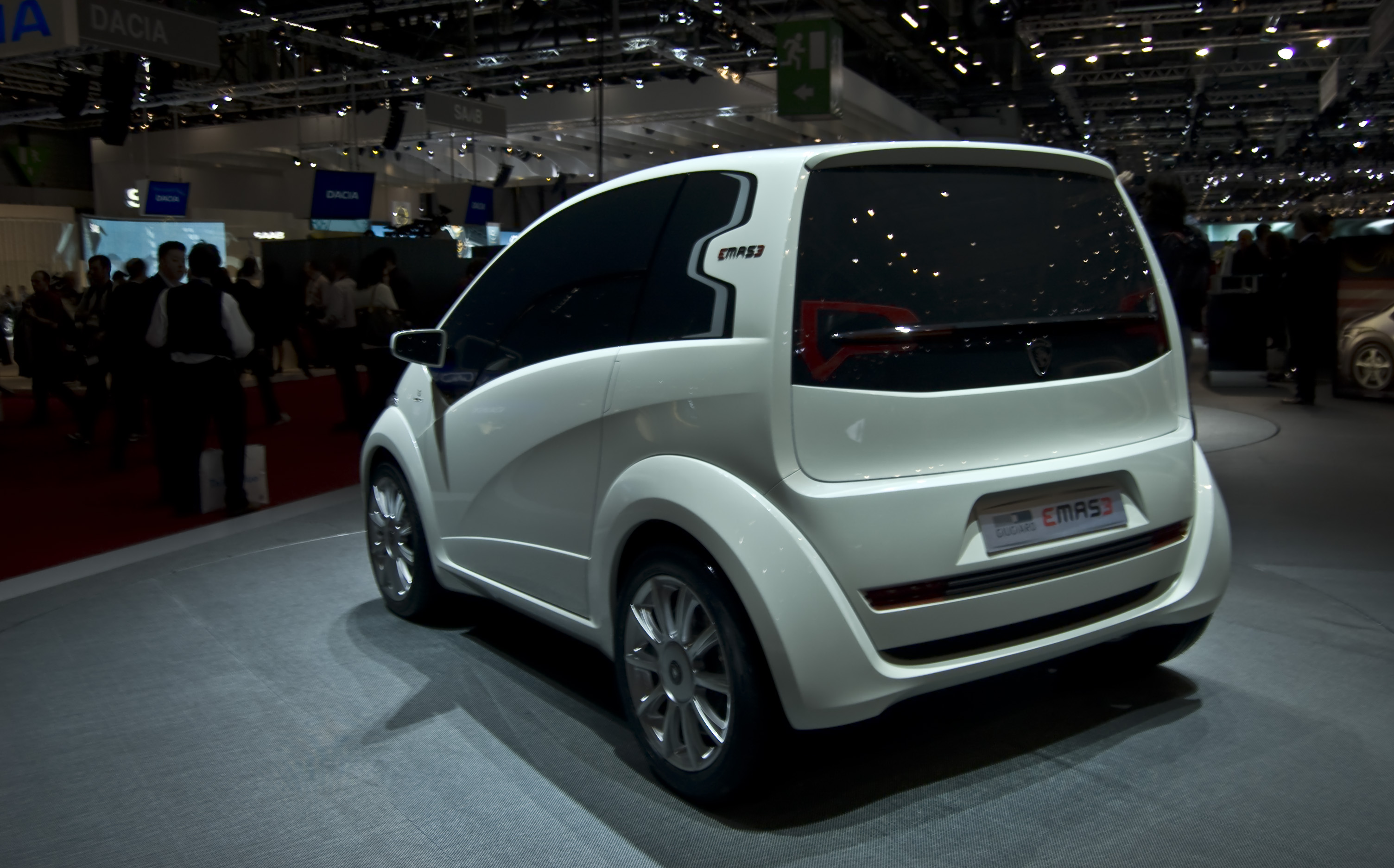
Rear view

=== Proton EMAS Country ===
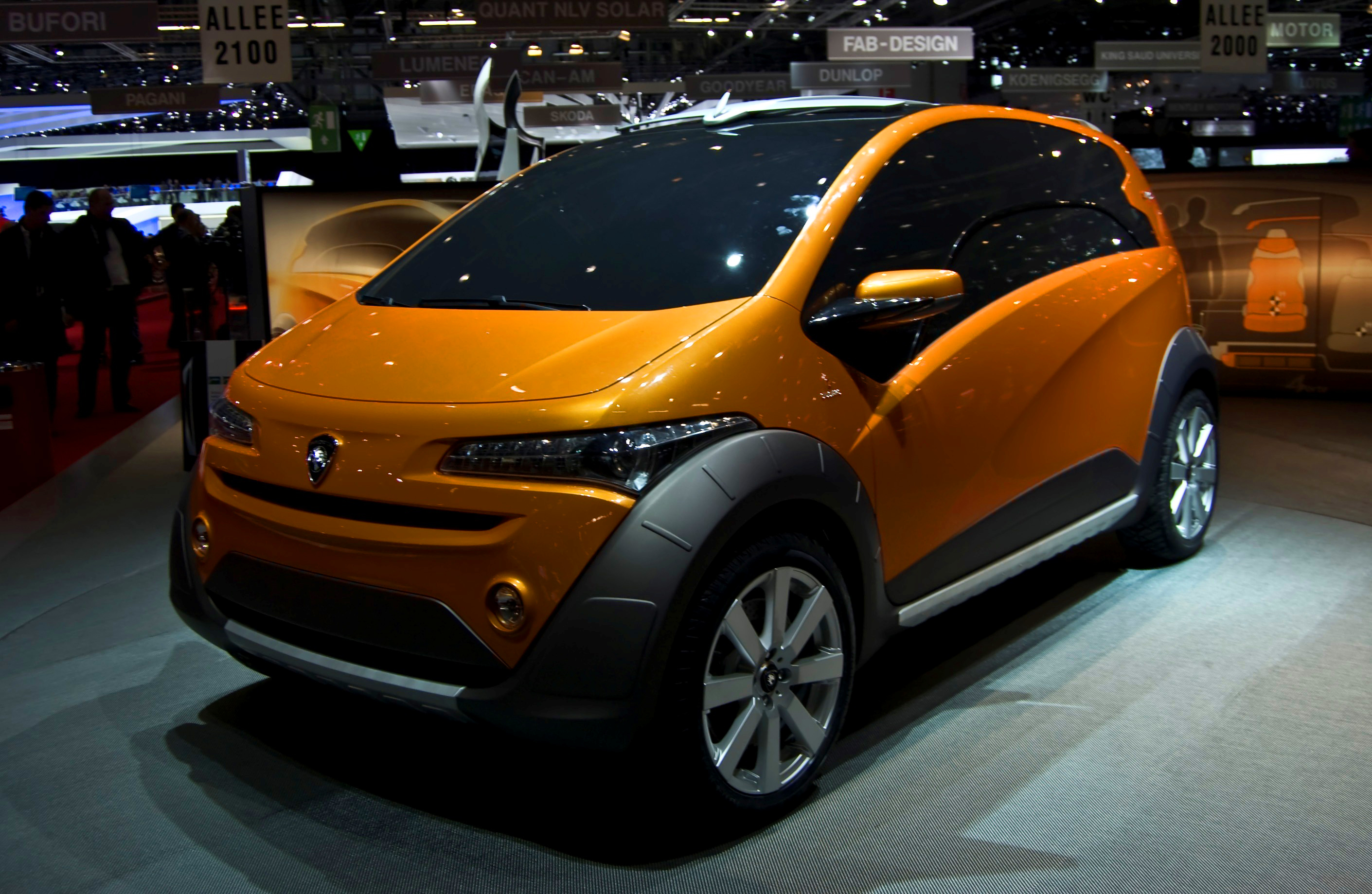
Front View

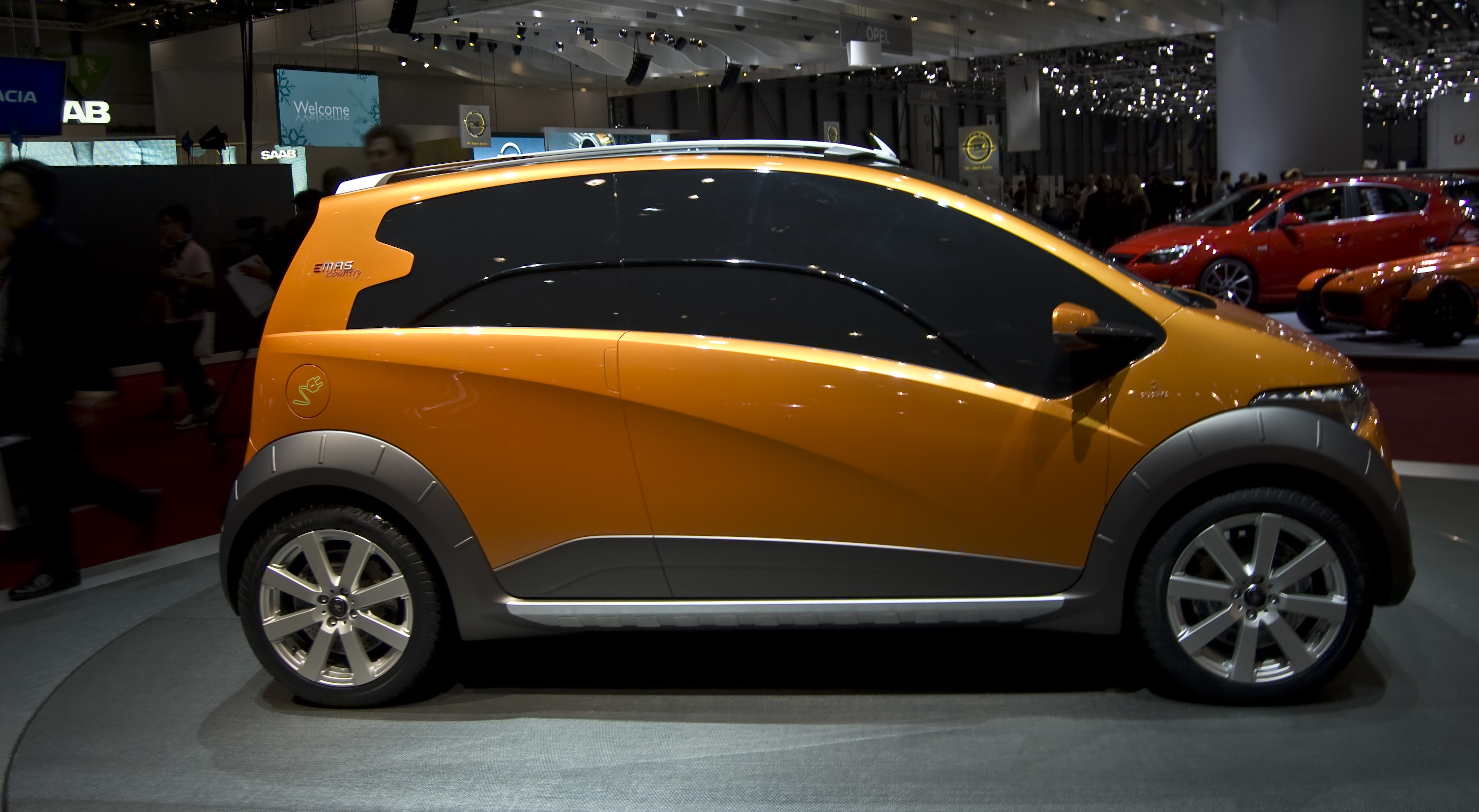
Side View

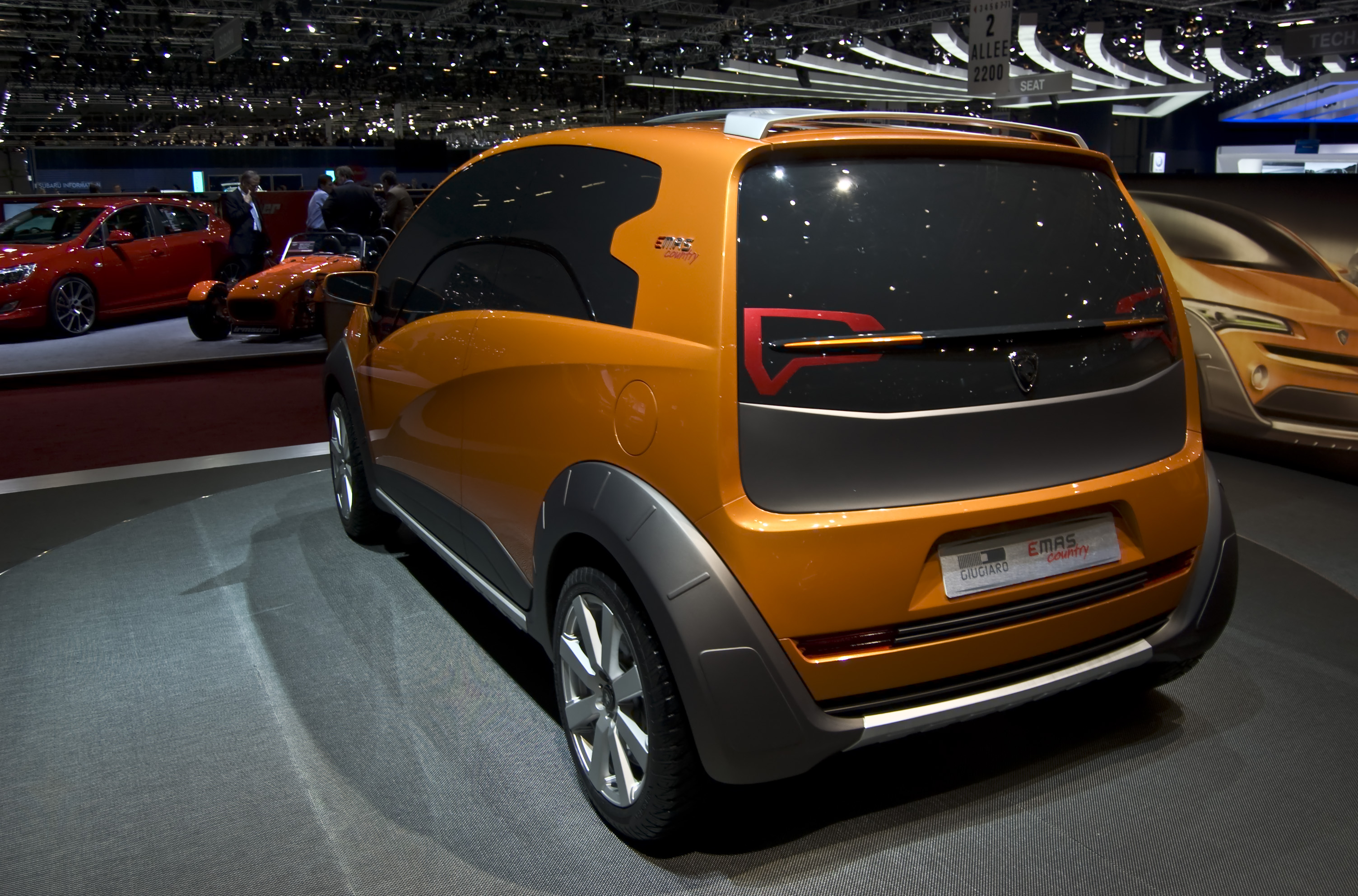
Rear View

== See also ==
- Proton Jebat
- Proton Lekiu
- Proton Iriz
