= Lotus Ethos =

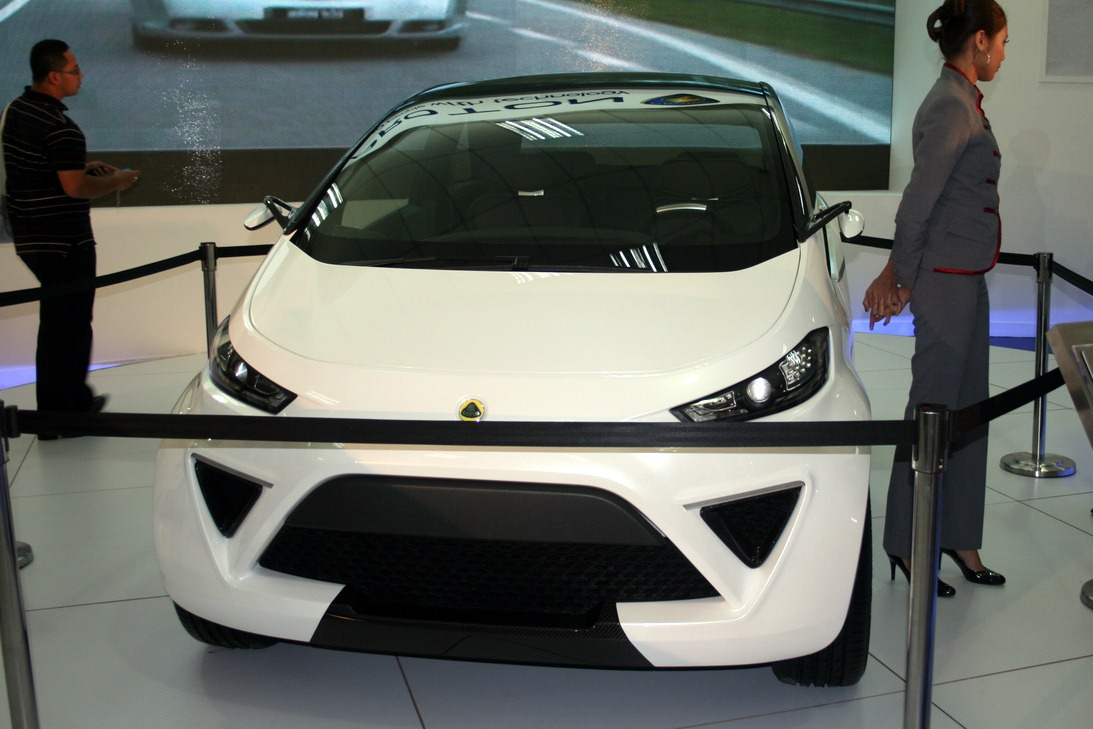

Overview
- Manufacturer: Lotus Engineering
- Production: 2010
- Designer: Donato Coco

Body and chassis
- Body style: 2-door hatchback
- Related: Proton EMAS

Powertrain
- Engine: 1.2 liter three-cylinder flex-fuel capable petrol engine

Dimensions
- Kerb weight: 1400 kg (3086 lbs)

The Lotus Ethos is a fully plug-in hybrid concept car that was unveiled at the 2010 Paris Motor Show as the "Lotus CityCar". The vehicle was developed by Lotus Engineering, a separate division from Lotus Cars. The CityCar has a lithium battery pack with an all-electric range of 60 km (37 miles), and after the battery is depleted the 1.2-litre petrol engine kicks in to help with charging, allowing the car to run more than 500 km (310 miles). The concept car is designed for flex-fuel operation on ethanol, or methanol as well as regular petrol.

== Specifications ==
The Ethos concept is an urban electric car with a 14.8 kWh lithium battery pack that delivers a range of up to 37 miles (60 km) in electric-only mode. The internal combustion engine is a flex-fuel-capable 47 hp, 1.2-litre three-cylinder petrol engine that acts as a generator charging the battery pack up to 310 miles (500 km). The concept car weighs less than 1400 kg, and Lotus claims it will reach 62 miles per hour (100 km/h) from rest in 9 seconds. Top speed is 170 kilometres per hour (110 mph), with a charge-sustaining top speed of 120 kilometres per hour (75 mph) and the drivetrain has CO_{2} emissions rating below of 60 g/km on the ECE-R101 test.

== Naming and production plans ==
In 2011 Lotus named the concept the Lotus Ethos. It is based on the EMAS from its parent company Proton and was to be assembled in Malaysia alongside the EMAS for an estimated cost in the UK of "£30,000 plus" but never entered production.

== See also ==
- Chevrolet Volt
- Proton EMAS
