= Proton Inspira =

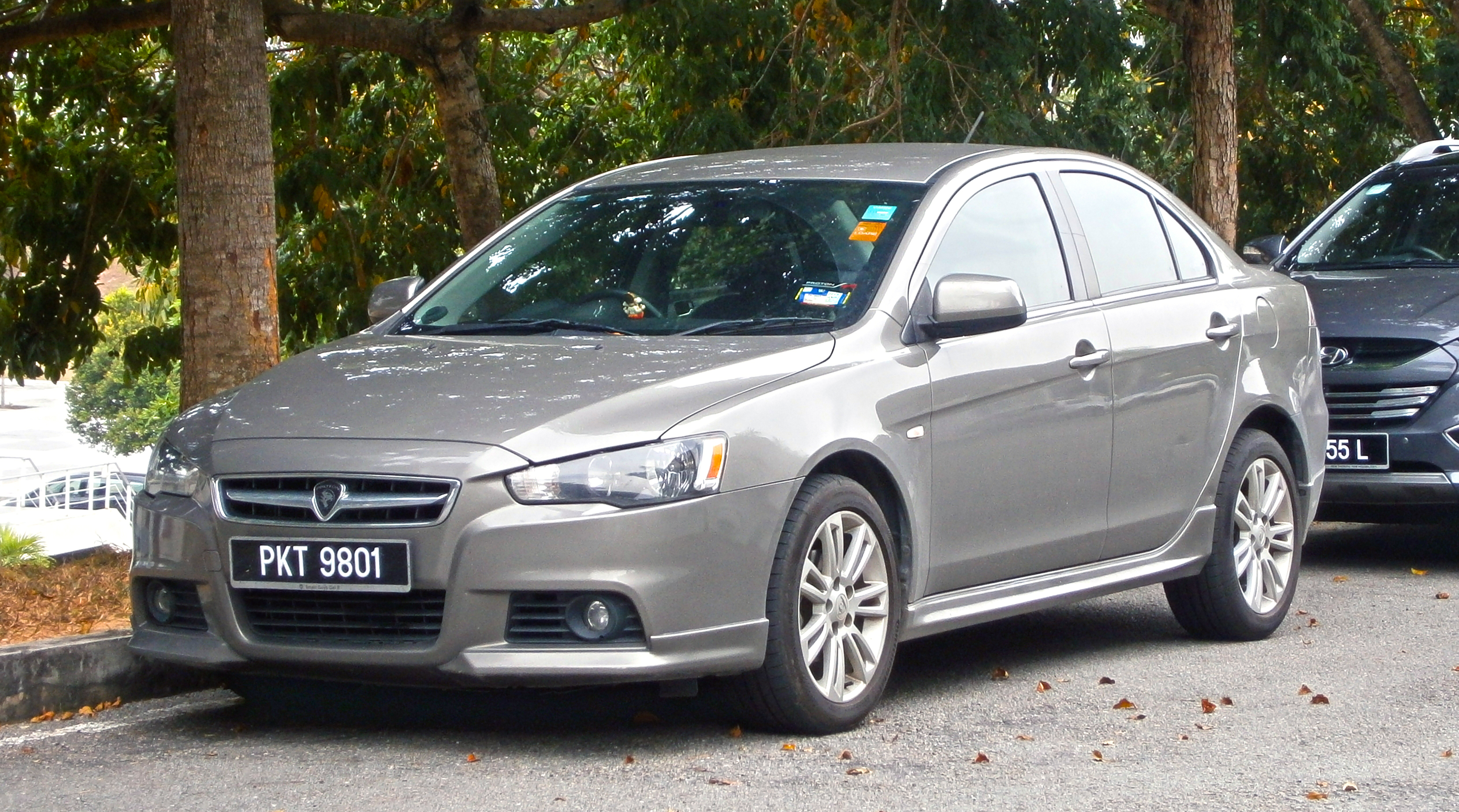

Overview
- Manufacturer: Proton
- Also called: Mitsubishi Lancer
- Production: October 2010 – April 2015
- Assembly: Malaysia: Shah Alam, Selangor (PONSB)

Body and chassis
- Class: Compact car (C)
- Body style: 4-door saloon
- Layout: Front-engine, front-wheel drive
- Platform: Mitsubishi GS
- Related: Mitsubishi Lancer; Proton Jebat

Powertrain
- Engine: 1.8 L 4B10 MIVEC DOHC I4; 2.0 L 4B11 MIVEC DOHC I4
- Transmission: 5-speed manual 6-speed INVECS-III CVT

Dimensions
- Wheelbase: 2,635 mm (103.7 in)
- Length: 4,570 mm (179.9 in)
- Width: 1,760 mm (69.3 in)
- Height: 1,490 mm (58.7 in)
- Kerb weight: 1,300–1,335 kg (2,866–2,943 lb)

Chronology
- Predecessor: Proton Waja
- Successor: Proton Prevé

The Proton Inspira is a four-door compact saloon produced by Malaysian automobile manufacturer Proton, which was first launched in November 2010.

It was sold exclusively in Malaysia as a rebadged ninth-generation Mitsubishi Lancer as the result of a collaboration between Mitsubishi Motors and Proton. The Inspira succeeded the Proton Waja, and complements the indigenously designed Proton Prevé in the Malaysian market.

The name "Inspira" comes from the Malay word Inspirasi, which means Inspiration in English.

== History ==
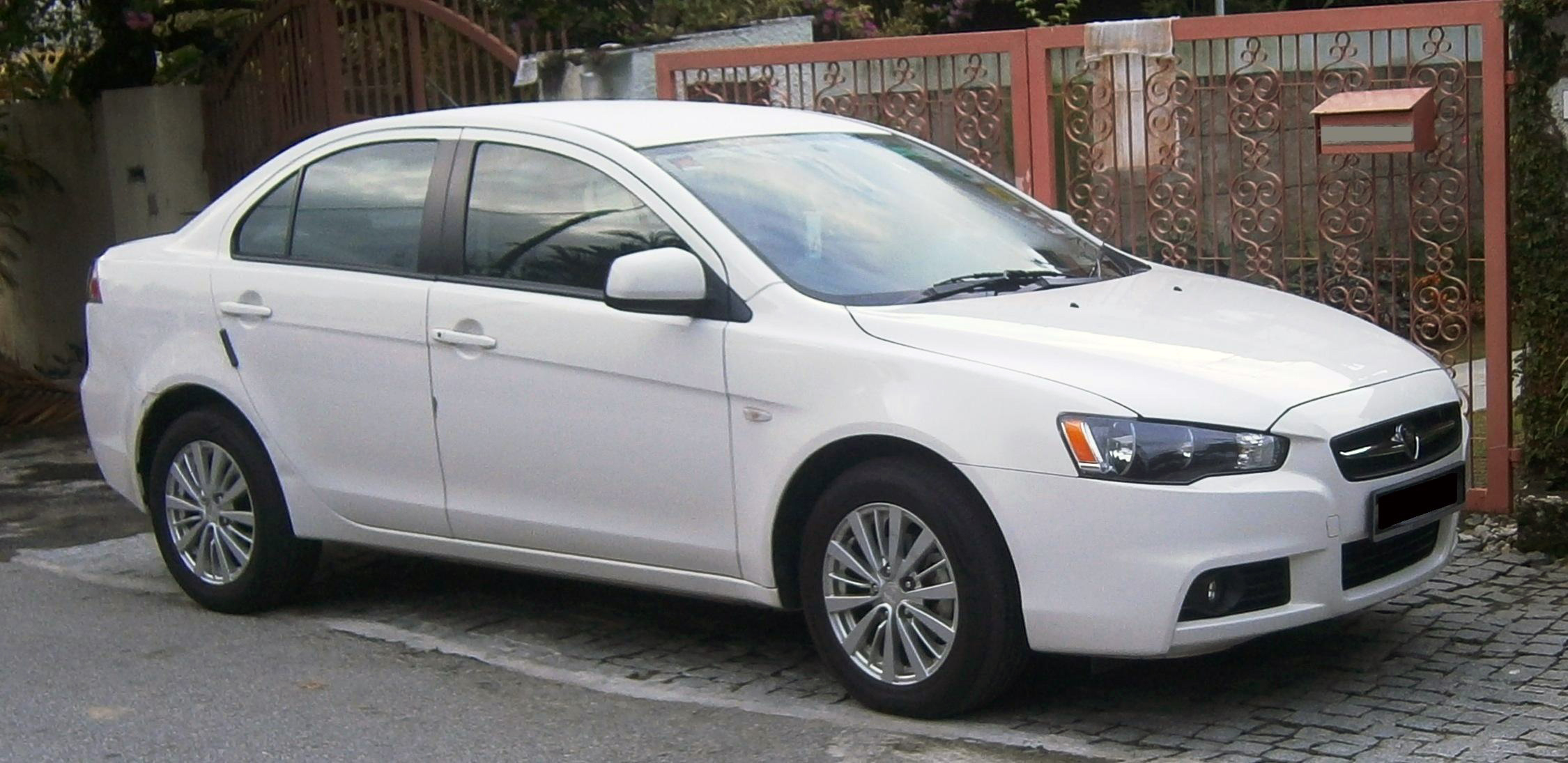

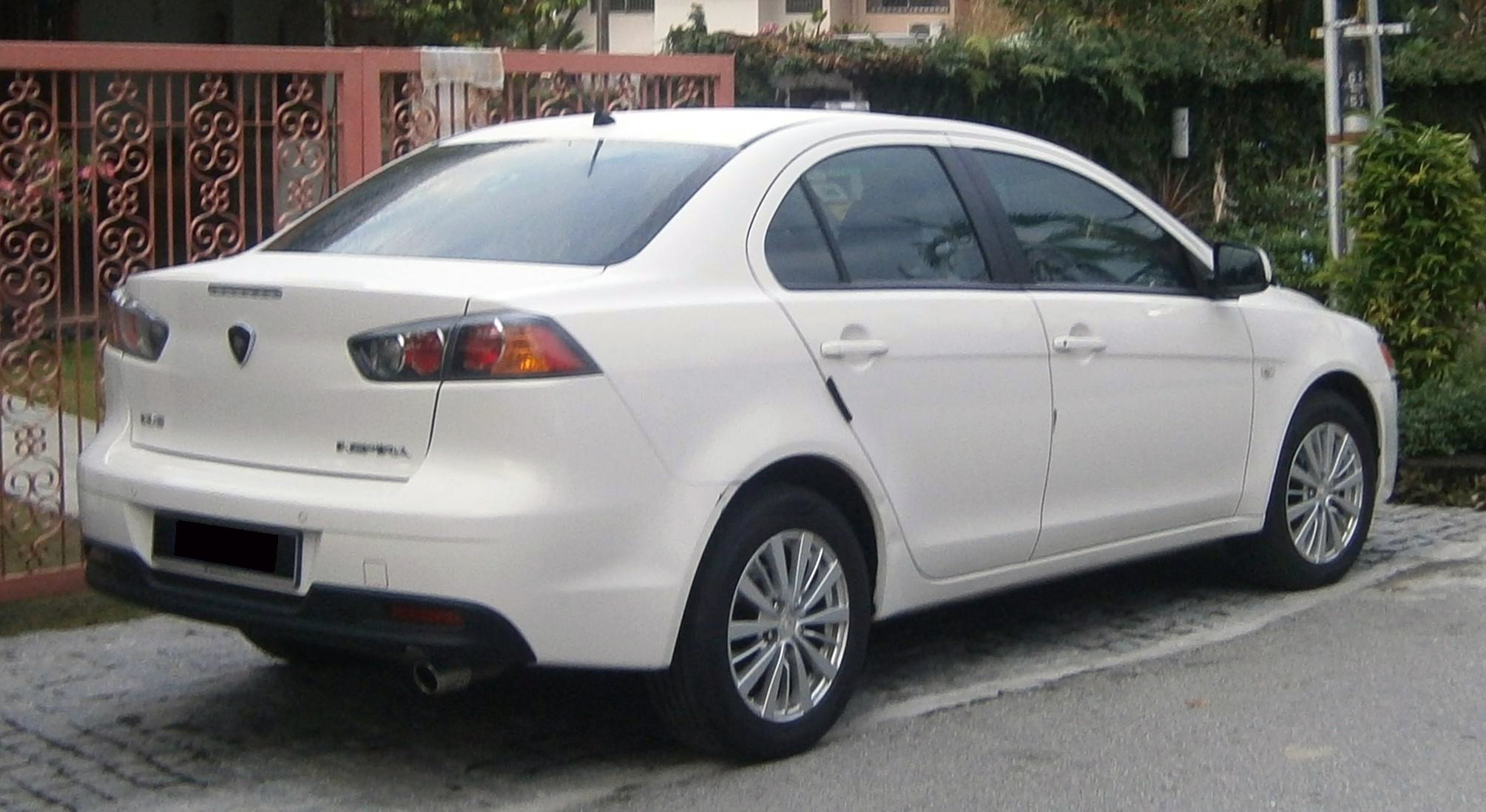
2010-2015 Proton Inspira 1.8E (Solid White)

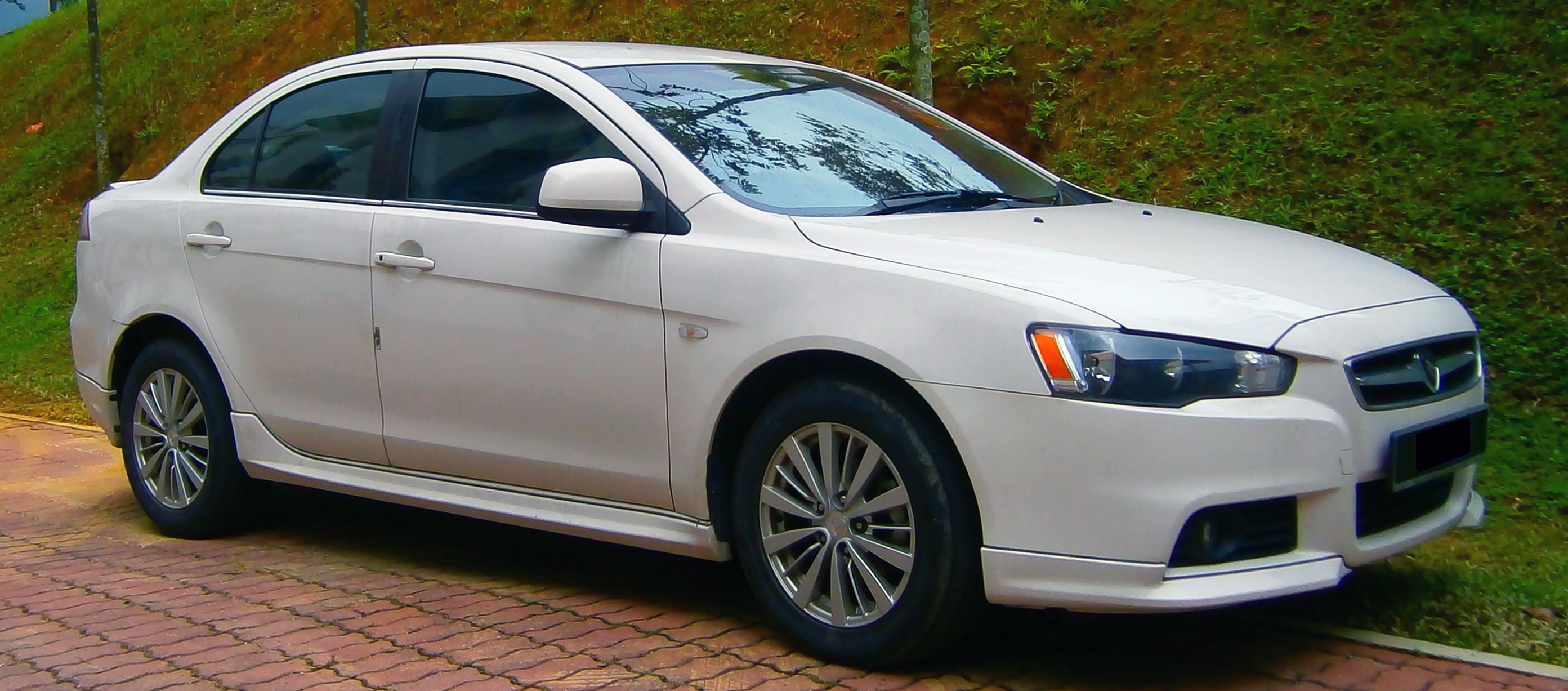

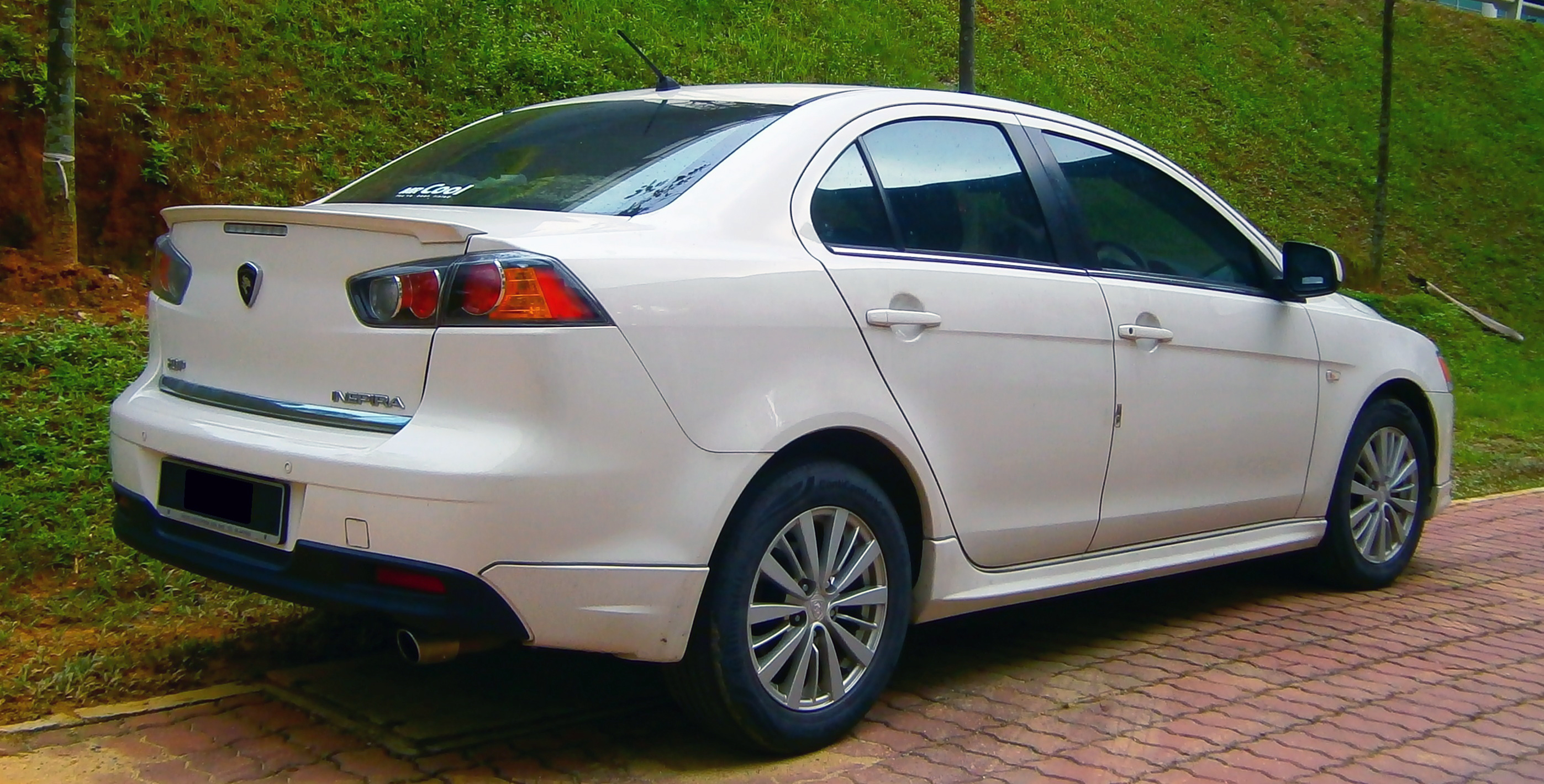
2010-2012 Proton Inspira 2.0P (Solid White)

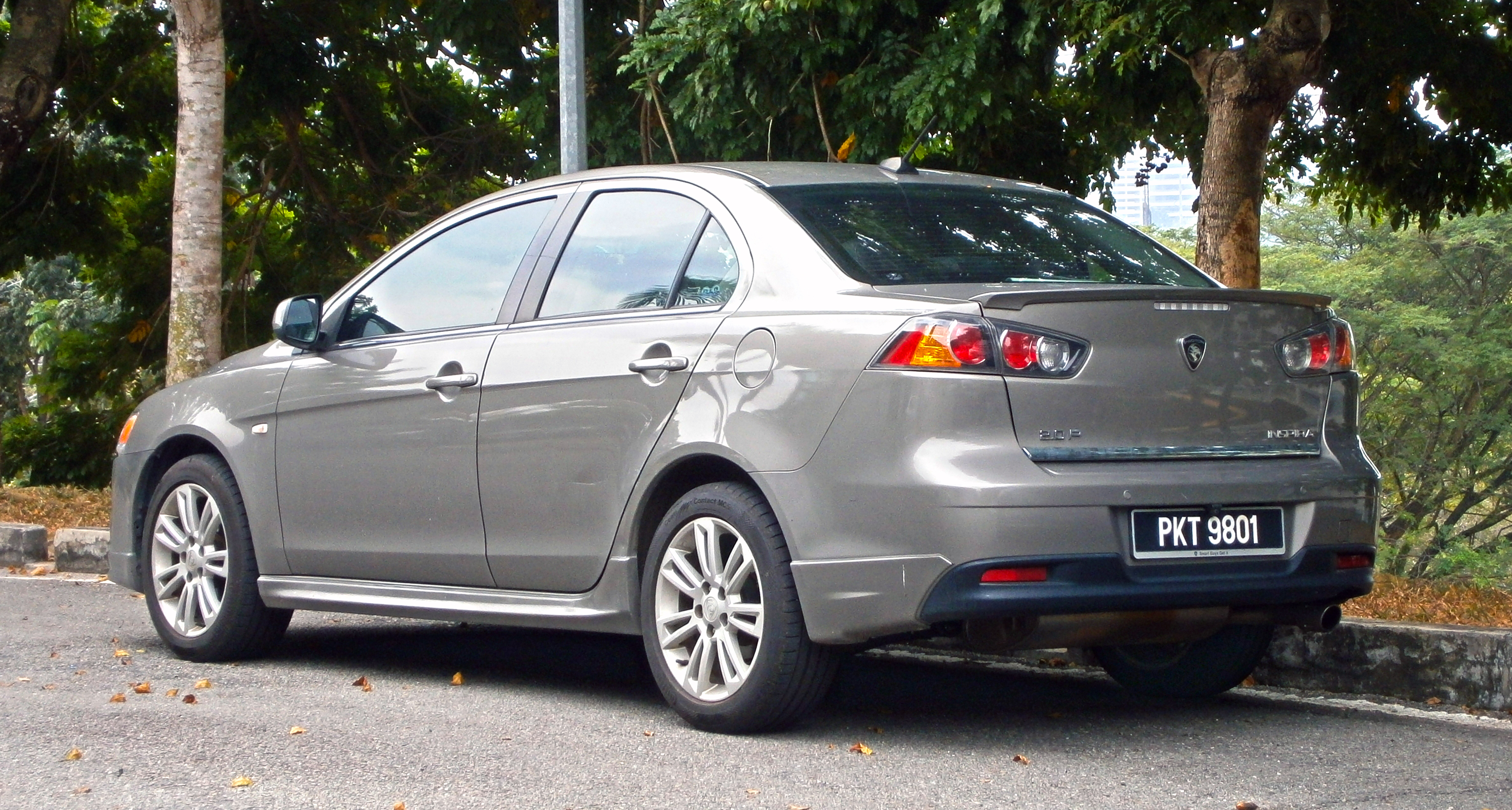
2012-2015 Proton Inspira 2.0P (Indiana Grey)

=== Overview ===
Proton renewed a technological transfer agreement with Mitsubishi Motors, an agreement that in the mid-1980s was fundamental to Proton's origins. Mitsubishi would get the Exora for rebadge in Japan under them as fair technology sharing.

1,100 orders were received within the first 10 days after dealers began accepting bookings for the Inspira. Price-wise, the Inspira costs significantly less than the Lancer in Malaysia because it is assembled locally, whereas the Mitsubishi is imported as a CBU from Japan. Not only are import duties much lower, but the investment Proton made to produce the model locally entitles it to financial incentives from the government that allows it to bring down prices.

However, certain parties have criticised Proton for returning to the practice of rebadging cars. A practice Proton had moved away from, with the release of the Proton Waja in the year 2000. Proton continued to independently develop 6 more models after that.

Proton group managing director Datuk Syed Zainal Abidin Syed Mohamed Tahir has reportedly said that it would cost Proton as much as RM700 million (US$230 million) to develop a new car from the ground up but only half the amount via its collaboration with Mitsubishi Motors. This enables the Proton Inspira to be marketed at a cheaper price.

Mitsubishi allowed Proton to rebadge the Lancer under conditions that there were no changes to any key features. The Inspira thus shares most of its components, including the powertrain which is imported in fully assembled form from Mitsubishi Motors Japan, with the Lancer. The Inspira did, however, feature tweaked suspension in order to improve the driving dynamics and handling, whilst Proton also worked to improve the build quality of the Inspira. The improvements to the car drew praise from Mitsubishi management after they inspected the Inspira in Shah Alam.

=== Timeline ===
On November 10, 2010, the Proton Inspira was debuted with two variants: 1.8E (Executive, manual or CVT transmission) & 2.0P (Premium, CVT only) with the choice of 4 colors: Plum Red, Solid White, Genetic Silver and Tranquility Black. Standard features included: Dual SRS airbags, leather-wrapped steering wheel, front pre-tensioner seatbelts, ABS with EBD, immobiliser and alarm system, central locking system, ISOFIX child seat anchors, rear parking sensors, solar and security tinted film, steering wheel-mounted audio controls, trunk lid remote release, front fog lights, welcome light system, driver's side anti-trap/auto up-down power window, height adjustable driver's seat and a MP3/Bluetooth-enabled head unit with Arkamys 3D DSP. The 2.0P added on cruise control, column-mounted shift paddles, dark brown wood trim (whereas the 1.8E uses matte silver trim), automatic climate control, automatic headlamp and rain sensors, body kits, a trunk lip spoiler, Nappa leather upholstery on both the seats and door trims, leather-wrapped gear knob and a GPS navigation system.

In November 2011, a limited edition of the Proton Inspira called the Proton Inspira R3 was launched. It was based on the 1.8E variant of the standard Inspira with changes such as an addition of R3 body kits, R3 trunk lip spoiler and R3 18" alloy wheels. However, this variant was only available in manual transmission.

In June 2012, the Proton Inspira 2.0 Executive was launched, replacing the 1.8E CVT and was available with a choice of 4 colors: Elegant Brown, Tranquility Black, Genetic Silver and Solid White. It features 16" alloy wheels with a new design. Compared to the 2.0 Premium variant, the 2.0 Executive variant features fabric upholstery on both the seats and door trims, and matte silver trim as opposed to 2.0P's dark brown wood trim. This variant also lacked automatic speed adjustment for windshield wipers—and body kits, along with the rear spoiler—were omitted.

In July 2012, the Proton Inspira 2.0 Premium was updated with 17" alloy wheels, as well as a different head unit which features touch screen interface. With the launch of the updated 2.0P variant, the Inspira was available with one new color: Indiana Grey (2.0P only).

In January 2014, the Proton Inspira Super Premium was launched with only one color available: Solid White. Moving on from the 2.0P, it adds on 18" R3 alloy wheels, R3 sport springs, R3 “Blood Stripe Stickers" and R3 body kits consisting of a front splitter, side skirts, a rear apron and a boot spoiler. The R3 add-ons were rather similar to those offered in the limited edition Proton Inspira R3. Like the 2.0P, it was only available in one transmission option: CVT.

In February 2015, the Proton Inspira was recalled, regarding concerns about the drive belt pulley (V-ribbed belt) for models made between September 2010 to May 2011.

In April 2015, the production of the Proton Inspira was officially halted.

In May 2016, the Proton Inspira was recalled again, now regarding an issue with a defective right turn indicator switch for vehicles made between 2010 and 2014.

== Specifications ==
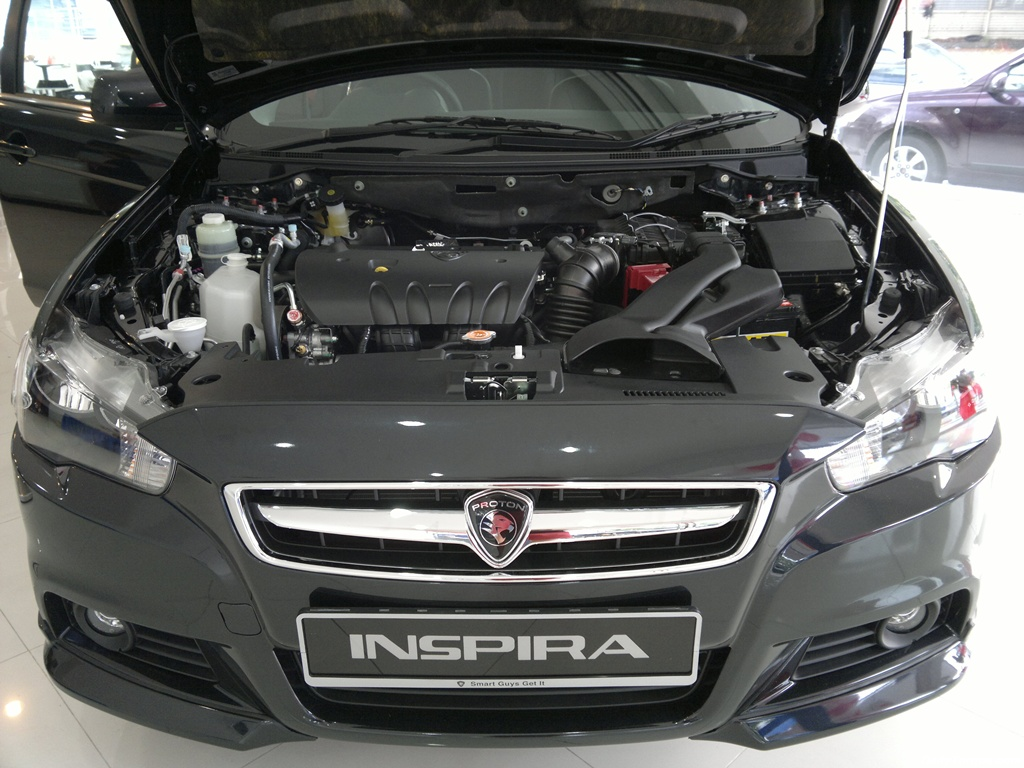
A Proton Inspira with Mitsubishi's 4B11 engine

The Proton Inspira was offered in 3 powertrains:

Powertrain and performance
	1.8 Manual	1.8 CVT	2.0 CVT
Engine	1.8L MIVEC 4B10, 4 Cylinder, DOHC 16V	1.8L MIVEC 4B10, 4 Cylinder, DOHC 16V	2.0L MIVEC 4B11, 4 Cylinder, DOHC 16V
Transmission	5-speed manual	6-speed INVECS-III CVT	6-speed INVECS-III CVT
Maximum Speed (km/h)	202 km/h (126 mph)	191 km/h (119 mph)	198 km/h (123 mph)
Acceleration 0–100 km/h (sec)	10 seconds	11.4 seconds	10.5 seconds
Maximum Power	138 hp (103 kW)@6000 rpm	138 hp (103 kW)@6000 rpm	148 hp (110 kW)@6000 rpm
Maximum Torque	177 N⋅m (131 lb⋅ft)@4250 rpm	177 N⋅m (131 lb⋅ft)@4250 rpm	197 N⋅m (145 lb⋅ft)@4250 rpm
Dimensions and weight
	1.8 Manual	1.8 CVT	2.0 CVT
Kerb Weight	1,300 kg (2,900 lb)	1,325 kg (2,921 lb)	1,335 kg (2,943 lb)

== Sales ==
Year	Malaysia (Note: Figures based on registration)
2010	829
2011	9,841
2012	4,459
2013	3,272
2014	1,004
2015	815
2016	108
