= Proton Jebat =

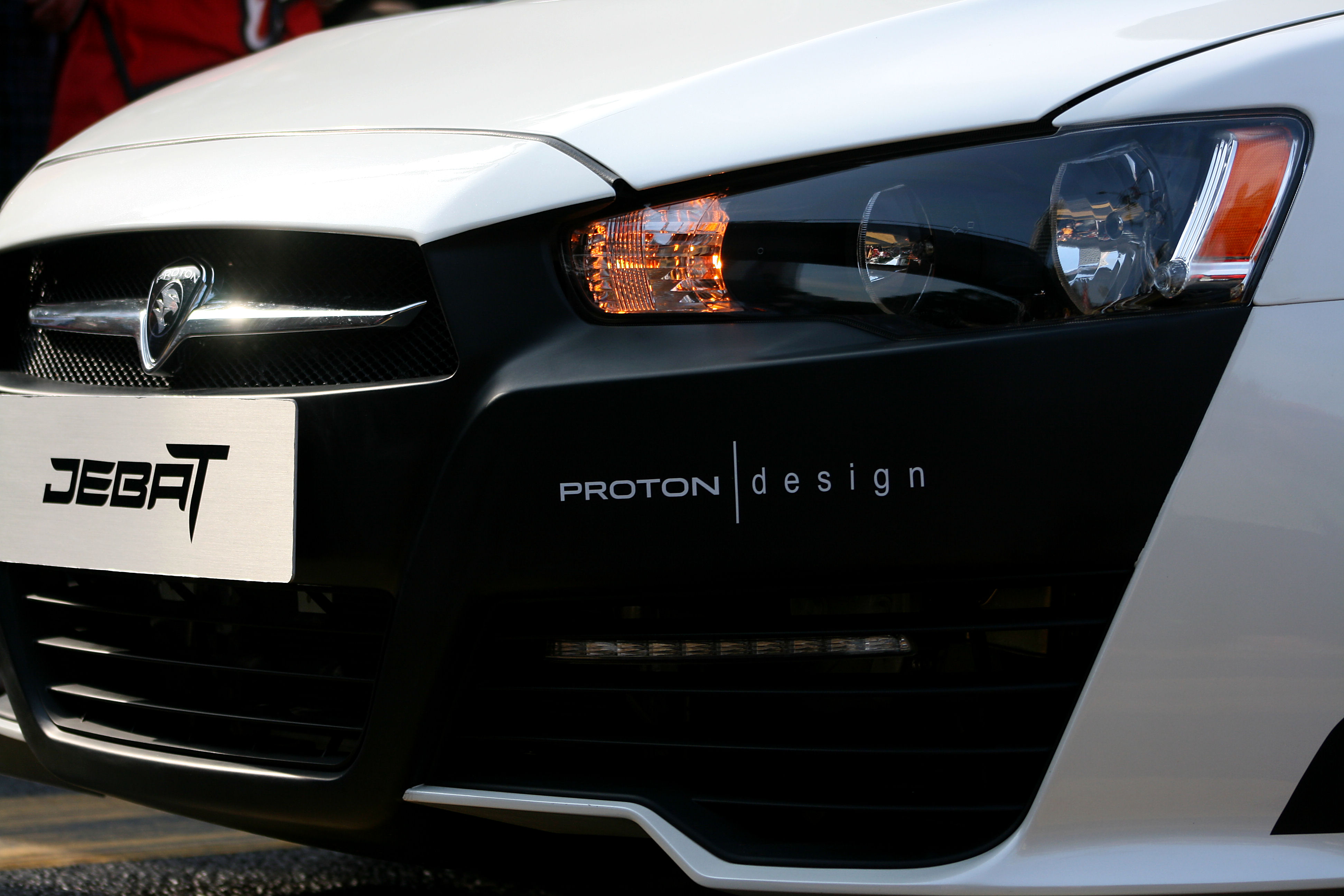

Overview
- Manufacturer: Proton
- Production: 2010 (concept car)

Body and chassis
- Class: Sport compact
- Body style: 4-door sedan
- Platform: Mitsubishi GS platform
- Related: Mitsubishi Lancer Evolution; Proton Inspira

Powertrain
- Engine: 2.0L MIVEC 4B11T DOHC I4

Dimensions
- Wheelbase: 2,635 mm (103.7 in)
- Length: 4,570 mm (179.9 in)
- Width: 1,760 mm (69.3 in)
- Height: 1,490 mm (58.7 in)
- Kerb weight: 1,135 kg (2,502 lb)

The Proton Jebat is a series of concept cars developed by Proton, a Malaysian automobile manufacturer, under the joint venture agreement from Mitsubishi Motors. It made its first appearance at the 2010 Kuala Lumpur International Motor Show (KLIMS 2010).

== Etymology ==
The name "Jebat" refers to a legendary warrior from Malacca called Hang Jebat. The car constitutes the Pahlawan series of Proton's concept cars, which are named after such warriors. Additionally, the nameplate has a pronunciation of very close to that of the Malay word, cepat, which means fast in English.

== Specifications ==
The Jebat is powered by a 2.0-litre 4B11T, in-line 4-cylinder, DOHC, 16-valve, MIVEC Turbo engine, with a maximum output of 237 hp (177 kW) and a maximum torque of 343 N⋅m (253 lb⋅ft). It can perform a 0–100 km/h (0–62 mph) acceleration in 5.6 seconds. The car is claimed to have a top speed of 232 km/h (144 mph).

Chassis
Power Steering	Hydraulic
Front Suspension	MacPherson Strut with Stabiliser Bar
Rear Suspension	Multi-link with Stabiliser Bar
Front Brake	15" Ventilated Disc
Rear Brake	14" Solid Disc
Tyre Size	245/40/R18
Wheel Type	18" Alloy Wheels
Dimensions
Ground Clearance	140 mm (5.5 in)

== See also ==
- Proton Inspira
- Mitsubishi Lancer Evolution
- Mitsubishi Lancer
