= List of Malaysian artists =

This is a list of Malaysian artists known for the creation of artworks that are primarily visual or graphic in nature, including media such as drawing, illustration, sculpture, painting, photography and printmaking. This list excludes musical artists.

The artists are arranged in alphabetical order by their surname, date of birth and death and profession.

== List of artists ==
- A.Kasim Abas (born 1948) – painter
- Ahmad Fuad Osman (born 1969) – painter
- Ahmad Zakii Anwar (born 1955) – painter
- Alex Ong (born 1951) – painter
- Andie Tong (Born 1979) – comic book artist
- Billy Tan (Born 1970) – comic book artist
- C. N. Liew (1975) – calligrapher, painter
- Chang Fee Ming (born 1959) – painter
- Cheah Thien Soong (born 1942) – contemporary ink-painting artist
- Cheng Haw-Chien (born 1948) – painter, Lingnan style
- Chuah Thean Teng (1914-2008) – painter
- Fahmi Reza (born 1977) – Political graphic designer, street artist and documentary film maker
- Germaine Koh (born 1967) – conceptual artist
- Ibrahim Hussein (1939-2009) – printing, collage
- Khalil Ibrahim (1934-2018) – studio artist
- Kopi Soh – digital artist and illustrator
- Lat (born 1951) – cartoonist
- Leon Lim – artist, designer, photographer
- Mior Shariman Hassan aka Mishar – cartoonist
- Mohammad Nor Khalid (born 1951) – cartoonist
- Mohamed Zain Idris (1939–2000) – painter
- Muid Latif (1979-2020) – digital artist
- Redza Piyadasa (1939-2007) – painter, art historian
- Rejab bin Had aka Rejabhad (1939 – 2002) – cartoonist
- Shing Yin Khor – cartoonist
- Sonny Liew (born 1974) – comic book artist
- Syed Thajudeen (born 1943) – painter
- Tang Tuck Kan (1934-2012) – painter
- Yong Mun Sen (1896–1962) – painter
- Yeoh Kean Thai (born 1966) – fine artist
- Yusof Ghani (born 1950) – painter, sculptor, professor
- Yong Mun Sen (1896-1962) – painter
- Wong Xiang Yi (born 1987) – visual artist
- Zulkiflee Anwar Haque aka Zunar (born 1962) – political cartoonist

== See also ==
- List of Malaysians
