= Khalil Ibrahim (disambiguation) =

Khalil Ibrahim (1957–2011) was the founder of the Justice and Equality Movement, Sudan.

Khalil Ibrahim or Ibrahim Khalil may also refer to:

== People ==
- Khalil Ibrahim (artist) (born 1934), Malaysian artist
- Ibrahim Khalil (diver) (born 1909), former Egyptian diver
- Khalil Ibrahim (footballer) (born 1993), Emirati footballer
- Ibrahim Khalil (playwright) (1916–1974), Bangladeshi writer and playwright
- Ibrahim Khalil (politician) (1947–1981), Bangladeshi politician
- Ibrahim Khalil (singer) (born 2000), Yazidi singer and songwriter
- Ibrahim Mohammed Khalil (fl. 2005), suspected al Qaida facilitator
- Ibrahim Khaleel (born 1982), Indian cricketer
- Ibrahim Khalil Khan (1732–1806), khan of the Karabakh Khanate

== Places ==
- Ibrahim Khalil border crossing between Turkey and Iraq
