= Atu the Dinoguardian =

1984-2021 Malaysia comic series

- Author: August King Cheong Swee Seng
- Country: Malaysia
- Language: Chinese, English, Malay
- Genre: Adventure, educational
- Publisher: (Malaysia) Active Art Studio (1984) (Malaysia) Kadokawa Gempak Starz (2016–2021)
- Published: (Malaysia) 1984
- Media type: Comics
- No. of books: More than 10

Atu the Dinoguardian, also known as Atu's Encounters (原始人阿土, Penemuan Atu) is a Malaysian comic series created by August King Cheong Swee Seng, serialized from 1984 to 2021. In the 1980s, it was regarded as the first standalone comic book series in Malaysia.

Atu the Dinoguardian follows the protagonist Atu’s daily life and adventures in prehistoric times. With a clumsy yet lovable demeanor, Atu tackles absurd yet humorous challenges such as hunting, making fire, building shelters, and dealing with dinosaurs and wild animals. Each chapter presents lighthearted comedy while conveying practical life wisdom and survival skills.

== Development ==
Malaysian Chinese comics began developing in the 1980s. Local comic artists initially published their works in newspapers and magazines before gradually releasing individual volumes. Due to the challenges of creation and publication, it was rare for comics to be compiled into books and officially published. In 1984, with the sponsorship of Luo Ping, the person in charge of Teenagers' Paradise (少年乐园) magazine, Active Art Studio (漫画人出版社) was founded, and Malaysia’s first standalone comic book, Atu the Dinoguardian, was released. It became popular as school reading material and received an enthusiastic response.

However, at a time when comics were still viewed as banned reading material in schools, August King Cheong ignored Luo Ping’s suggestions and self-published other types of comics, selling them at stalls and competing with works by Wong Yuk-long. As a result, Atu the Dinoguardian ceased publication, and Active Art Studio also shut down.

In 2016, Atu the Dinoguardian was relaunched by Kadokawa Gempak Starz with a brand-new look. In 2019, to cater to the growing demand for children’s popular science content, the spin-off series Atu's Encounters: Curious World was introduced. In 2021, Atu the Dinoguardian officially concluded.

== List of published media ==
=== Active Art Studio ===
1. Atu the Dinoguardian, 1984

=== Kadokawa Gempak Starz ===
==== Atu's Encounters: Curious World ====
1. The Swamp Monster: Topic: Swamps, February 2021, ISBN 9789672993001
2. The Red Scorpion: Topic: Deserts, June 2021, ISBN 9789672849117

== Awards ==
- 2009: 1st Malaysian Chinese Comics Society – Chinese Professional Comics Awards (Comic Contribution Award)
