= Malaysian comics =

Comic originating in Malaysia

Malaysian comics (Malay: komik, kartun, cergam (Note: cergam is an abbreviation of cerita gambar, meaning "story picture".)) originated in colonial Malaya in the early 20th century as single-panel satirical cartoons in newspapers. Following World War II and Malaya's independence in 1957, comic strips became the dominant form in newspapers. By the end of the 1970s humor magazines featuring satirical cartoons flourished. Indigenous comic book publishing started as early as the 1950s but it gained widespread recognition only in the 1980s. While early Malaysian comics were heavily influenced by American styles, Japanese manga has increasingly shaped contemporary Malaysian comics, in line with global trends.

Malaysia is a multicultural nation, primarily composed of Malays and Chinese, with smaller Indians and other communities. Its complex geopolitical history, from the colonial period to the present, has often been reflected in its comics. Ethnic harmony is a national policy, supported by government initiatives promoting national unity to prevent a recurrence of the 1969 race riot. Many Malaysian comics portray the country as a tolerant society where diverse ethnic groups coexist, though some argued that the nation's mixed cultural identity—and its comics—are still evolving. Traditionally, each ethnic group produced comics in its language. Due to the small and fragmented market size, scholars suggest Malaysian comics have not developed a distinctive style comparable to those of Japan or the United States.

== History ==
Malaysia was formed in 1963 through the union of several former British colonies. Cartooning in the region dates back to 19th-century British Malaya. Singapore (part of Malaysia until 1965) and Penang, key trading hubs in Malaya, had thriving publishing industries that were central to the development of Malaysian comics until the mid-20th century. The Nanyang Academy of Fine Arts, established in Singapore in 1938, also contributed by training satirical cartoonists. Comics publishing in Kuala Lumpur and Johor Bahru gained significance later in the mid-20th century, while regional comics in East Malaysia started to develop in the 21st century.

The following period classification is based on Muliyadi 2012, p. 122.

=== Pioneer Era: 1930s to 1957 ===
==== Early history ====
Modern cartoons were introduced during the colonial era. The Straits Produce, an English-language newspaper founded in 1868 for British merchants in Malaya, featured satirical cartoons, modelling after Punch magazine. It is considered the third publication of its kind in Asia, following Japan Punch (1862) in Japan and China Punch (1867) in China.

Immigrant workers in British Malaya published newspapers in their native languages. Singapore's Chinese-language newspaper, Chong Shing Yit Pao, began featuring cartoons in 1907. Founded by supporters of revolutionary Sun Yat-sen, its early works primarily criticized the Qing dynasty. In the early 20th century, Chinese satirical cartoons often focused on political issues in China. After the Marco Polo Bridge incident in 1937, they increasingly condemned Japan's invasion of China. When Japan occupied British Malaya in 1942 during the Pacific War, many of these artists were executed by the Japanese military.

==== The emergence of Malay cartoons ====
Malay satirical cartoons developed later than their Chinese counterparts. Some attribute this delay to Malay newspapers modeling themselves after Arab publishers, who discouraged the use of illustrations. Others suggest that the Malays' relatively privileged position among colonial ethnic groups lessened their motive for political satire.

Early Malay newspapers focused primarily on the correct usage of the Malay language usage and religious issues. However, by the 1930s, they began reflecting growing concern about the changing social landscape. Warta Jenaka (Note: Warta Jenaka was a weekly supplement to the daily newspaper Warta Malaya.) introduced satirical cartoons by S. B. Ally, along with amateur submissions from readers. In 1939, Utusan Zaman, (Note: Utusan Zaman was a Sunday supplement to Utusan Melayu, which was the first newspaper published and owned by Malays.) a Muslim-oriented major newspaper, debuted one of Malaya's first cartoon characters, Wak Ketok (lit. Uncle Knock). Created for columns by a seminal journalist Abdul Rahim Kajai and illustrated by Ali Sanat, Wak Ketok drew inspiration from traditional funny stories like those of Pak Pandir. These early cartoons often antagonized the colonial government and Chinese, Indian, and Arab immigrants, while also highlighting shortcomings within the Malay community, such as indebtedness and carelessness, in an effort to inspire a sense of Malay nationalism.

During the Japanese occupation, each ethnic group in Malaya developed a sense of independence after witnessing the fragility of British rule. Tunku Abdul Rahman, later regarded as the founding father of the Malaysia, created anti-Japanese and nationalistic cartoons during the era. In contrast, watercolorist Abdullah Ariff produced pro-Japanese propaganda cartoons for Penang Shimbun, a newspaper run by the Japanese military. In 1942, his works were compiled into a book titled Perang Pada Pandangan Juru-Lukis Kita (lit. The War as Seen by Our Cartoonists) with text in Malay, Chinese, and English.

==== Post-war ====
In the political vacuum that following World War II, the Malayan Emergency broke out, with Communist guerrillas, primarily Chinese, clashing with the British army. This conflict heightened ethnic tensions. Malay cartoons frequently targeted the communists, while some Malay and Chinese cartoonists of the era sought to promote ethnic harmony and progressivism through social and political satire. Tan Huay Peng, an editorial cartoonist for The Straits Times, became known for his symbolic works advocating independence from British rule.

While political cartoons were prominent in this era, Malaysian comic strips began to take shape in 1947. That year, the Singaporean magazine Kenchana featured "Tunggadewa", a Malay-language historical adventure strip. Its publication was driven by editor Harun Aminurrashid's belief in the need for comics with an Eastern sensibility, addressing what he perceived as a cultural gap left by American comics. Harun subsequently played a pivotal role as amentor for early Malay comic creators.

The first comic books to reach Malaya were British weekly series such as The Beano and The Dandy, imported as scrap paper in the 1930s. The earliest known Malay comic book is believed to be Hang Tuah (Untuk Anak-Anak) by Nasjah Djamin, published in Indonesia in 1951, which depicted the legend of the hero Hang Tuah. In Singapore, Malay comic books began to flourish with the publication of Pusaka Datuk Moyang (lit. Treasure of the Ancestors) in 1952. Nora Abdullah, who adapted the story of the legendary Queen Siti Wan Kembang in 1955 at just 15 years old, became the first female Malay comic book artist.

Early comic themes predominantly revolved around history and folklore but later expanded to include romance, detective stories, science fiction, and even imitation of the American hero Batman. Despite early success, comic book publishing in Singapore declined by the early 1960s, with Penang — home to publishers such as Sinaran Brothers—emerging as the industry's new hub. However, the industry experienced further downturns after the 1960s.

=== New Era: 1957 to the 1970s ===
The Federation of Malaya gained independence from Britain in 1957. Following territorial realignment and the withdrawal of Singapore, present-day Malaysia was established. Unlike the colonial government, which upheld freedom of expression, the independent government sought to control the mass media to ensure political stability. As a result, political cartoons vanished from newspapers in all languages, replaced by syndicated foreign comic strips focused on adventure and humor. Western works such as Flash Gordon, Tarzan, Mandrake the Magician, and The Saint became popular features in local newspapers.

Newspapers also featured one-panel and strip cartoons by Malay cartoonists such as Raja Hamzah, Rejabhad, and Mishar. Raja Hamzah emerged as a key figure in postwar Malay comics. His family humor strip, Keluarga Mat Jambul (lit. Mat Jambul's Family) serialized in Brita Harian, was inspired by the British strip The Gambols. Hamzah's other works, such as Dol Keropok & Wak Tempeh in Utusan Melayu, depicted village life and classical literature. These works significantly influenced future cartoonists, most notably Lat.

The 1960s and 1970s are often regarded as the golden age of Malaysian comics. Beginning in the 1970s, government cultural policies promoting national identity encouraged the growth of homegrown comic strips, leading some newspapers to discontinue foreign works. In 1973, the Association of Cartoonists and Illustrators (PERPEKSI (Note: Persatuan Pelukis Komik Kartun dan Ilustrasi)) was established, elevating the status of comic creators. That same year, Suarasa, a company founded by comic artists, published comic books for children focused on Malay cultural education, achieving notable success with sales of 30,000 copies. Also in 1973, the National Art Gallery hosted its first exhibition of single-panel cartoon works from Asian countries.

This period also saw the rise of a new generation of artists, including Lat, Nan, Meor Shariman, Jaafar Taib, and Zainal Buang Hussin. Lat gained nationwide recognition with Keluarga Si Mamat (lit. The Family of Mamat) and Scenes of Malaysian Life, wchich appeared in newspapers for several decades starting around 1970. The popularity of Scenes of Malaysian Life, a social sketch incorporating subtle satire, reignited the genre of editorial cartoon in newspapers after their temporary disappearance. Lat merchandised his own work and achieved rare financial success in the Malaysian comic industry. His book The Kampung Boy, a memoir reflecting traditional Malay culture, gained international acclaim. Nan, another prominent cartoonist, created the family strip Din Teksi and the slapstick Barber's Corner in the Malay-language newspaper Utusan Melayu.

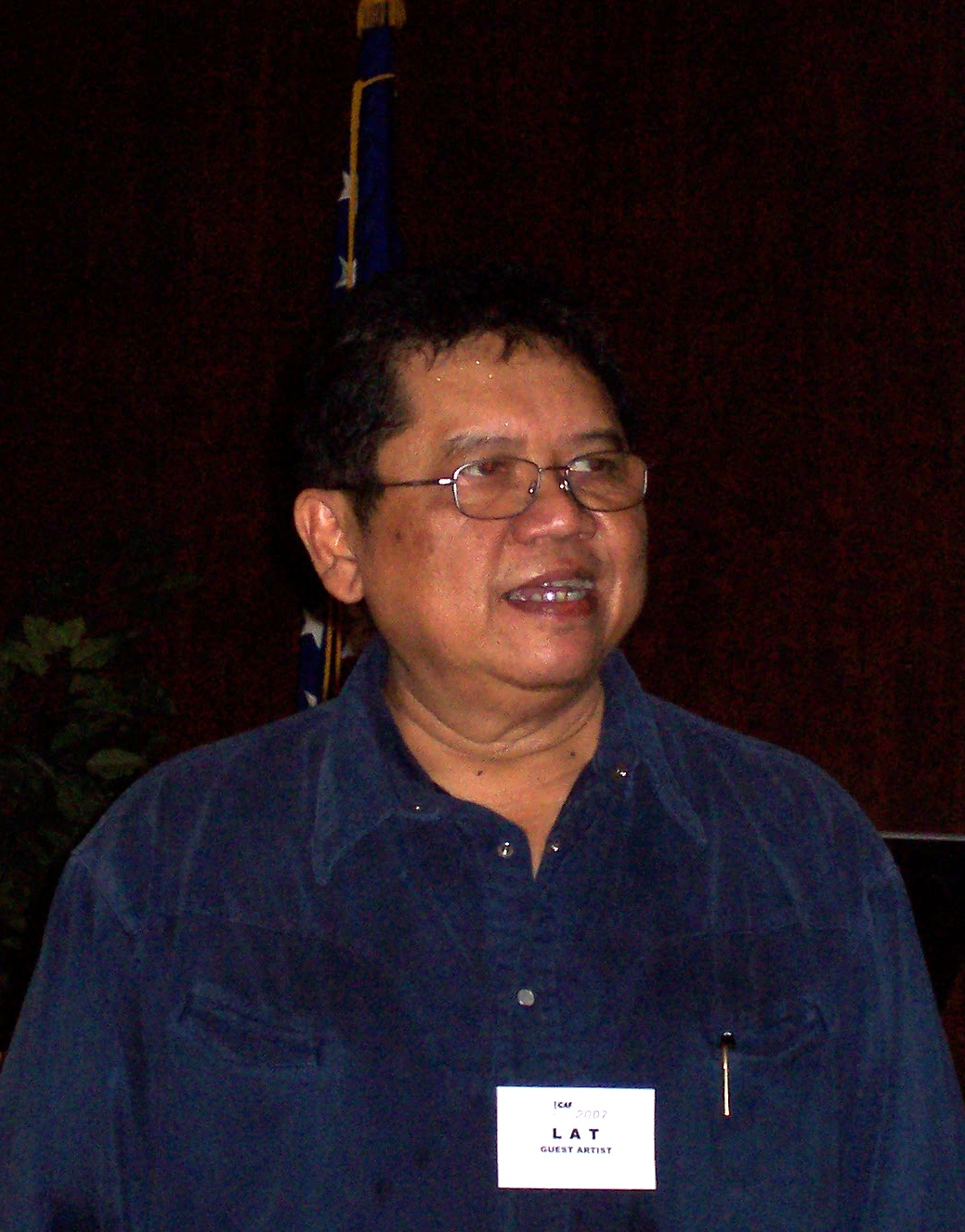
Lat, a leading Malaysian cartoonist, at the International Comic Arts Forum (2007).

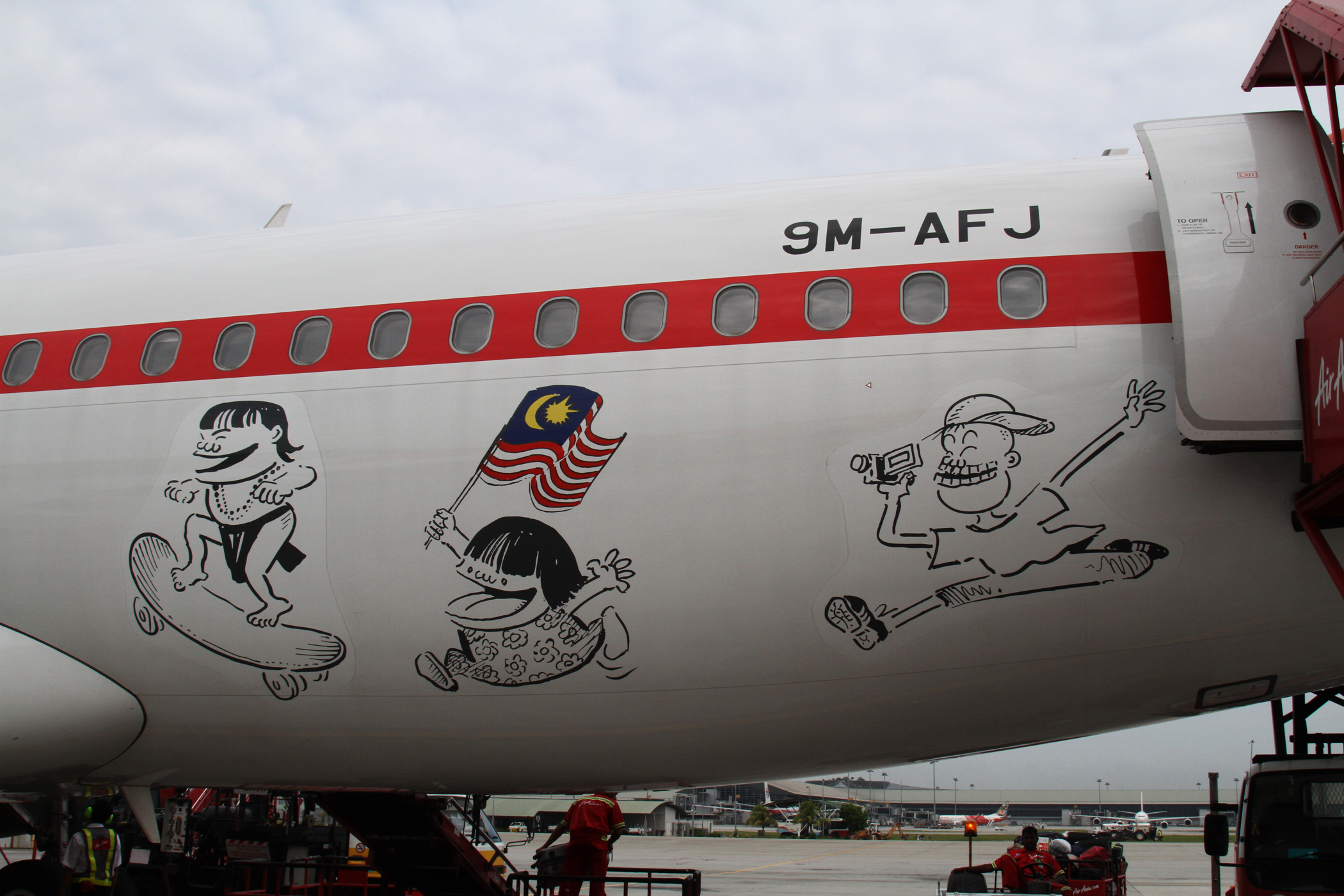
AirAsia airliner featuring Lat's characters (2010).

=== Glory Era: The 1980s ===
==== Gila-Gila and humor magazines ====
A standout publication of this period was Gila-Gila, launched in 1978 by cartoonists Jaafar Taib, Mishar, and others. The title, derived from the Malay word gila meaning “mad”, reflected its inspiration from the American humor magazine Mad. Known for its satire of Western culture, Mad was popular among students and the English-educated population during the late 1960s and 1970s, a time when Westernization was being promoted in Malaysia. Gila-Gila aimed to satirize Malay society in Malay language, producing cartoons that parodied Malay literature, folklore, history, and films. The magazine was a major success, with its circulation reaching 200,000 at its peak, making it the largest magazine in the country.

The success of Gila-Gila inspired the emergence of other humor magazines, including Gelihati, published by a major book publisher. By 2003, more than 50 humor magazines had sprung up in the market, leading to saturation. To adapt, magazines began specializing in specific genres, such as Lanun (religion) and Mangga (entertainment). The first women's humor magazine, Cabai, featured one of rare female cartoonists, Cabai. The teen-oriented magazine Ujang was named after its lead artist, Ujang, who began his career at Gila-Gila. Ujang revitalized the Malaysian comics industry in the early 1980s with Aku Budak Minang (lit. I am a Minang Kid) and Atuk (lit. Grandpa), both of which were adapted into animated series. Due to the limited Malay-language market, some magazines were published in English, while others focused on silent cartoons. Despite the challenges, humor magazines like Bekazon continued to be published into the 2020s.

By this time, most Malaysian cartoonists held other primary jobs, but Gila-Gila changed the landscape by raising fees to a level where full-time cartoonists could make a living. (Note: As of 1984, Gila-Gila was paying its contributors a maximum page fee of 35 ringgit. By Malaysian standards of average income at the time, this was comparable to around 1,000 dollars in the United States. In contrast, fees for newspaper cartoons were as low as about 5 ringgit per work, largely due to competition with foreign works which had lower copyright fees.) The magazine also nurtured young artists, fostering interaction among artists and elevating their status. By around 1990, the total number of cartoonists contributing to humor magazines around was estimated to about 50 full-time professionals and 100 semi-professionals.

==== Foreign comics ====
In addition to humor magazines, foreign comics were widely popular. Comic books from the United States and the United Kingdom, the former colonizer, were readily available, while residents of Chinese and Indian descent imported works from their home countries. Popular Chinese comics of the period included Hong Kong's Old Master Q and Chinese Hero as well as Taiwanese works by Tsai Chih-chung and Zhu Deyoung, and classic Lianhuanhua.

Afte 1981, when Prime Minister Mahathir introduced the Look East policy, human exchange between Malaysia and Japan increased, fueling interest in Japanese pop culture. By the late 1980s, pirated copies of Japanese, Taiwanese, and Hong Kong comics began flooding the Malaysian market. Although manga entered Malaysia later than Hong Kong and Taiwan due to the limited direct influence from Japan, it quickly gained acceptance. Classic series such as Astro Boy, Candy Candy, and Doraemon became widely recognized, alongside contemporary titles like Akira and Dragon Ball.

Pirated Malay translations also appeared in the 1990s, openly published by specialized publishers. These publications were tacitly ignored by both government authorities and foreign copyright holders, given Malaysia's relatively small market. Chinese book rental shops served as the primary distribution channels for these comics.

Pirated copies hindered the growth of Malaysia's domestic comic industry. As of 1984, only a few Malay comic book publishers existed, with typical titles achieving a monthly circulation of approximately 15,000, most of which were short-lived. Popular genres included history and adventure, while some publishers drew inspiration from American superhero comics.

Chinese-language comics in Malaysia were pioneered by Yap Teng, known for his editorial cartoons in the 1970s, and by August King Cheong Swee Seng, Huang Yi Qi, and Sen Ling Mu, who established Active Art Studio in the 1980s. By the late 1990s, children's comics such as Gemeilia: Kokko & May rose to prominence. However, as Japanese manga grew increasingly influential, Chinese-language comics began to lose momentum.

In the 1980s, the mainstream newspaper New Straits Times featured a series of columns introducing both domestic and foreign comics, significantly increasing social awareness of the medium. The column's author, Daniel Chan, organized Malaysia's first comic convention in 1984. This event inspired fans to create Malaysia's first fanzine, APAzine, which paid homage to Marvel Comics. It also leads to the opening of specialty stores focusing on U.S. comics, primarily in the suburbs of Kuala Lumpur. The popularity of these expensive U.S. comics peaked in the 1990s, with a dedicated group of enthusiasts forming the core of the fan base.

=== Pluralist Era: 1990s to 2010s ===
Following the Asian financial crisis at the close of the 20th century, globalization transformed the region's comics scene. The rise of the Internet played a pivotal role in popularizing Japanese anime and manga in Malaysia. Broadband access and file-sharing software accelerated consumption among young people who had grown up with Japanese pop culture through rental bookstores. Around the 1990s, Japanese manga publishers began expanding their overseas copyright business, enabling the official distribution of manga throughout Southeast Asia.

Later generations of Malaysian creators showed a stronger preference for genres like science fiction and fantasy over traditional culture and history, drawing heavy influence from Japanese and other foreign works. Domestic comics produced before the early 1990s were rarely reprinted, and the traditional styles developed by artists such as Lat, Rejabhad, Jaafar Taib, and others were largely left behind.

The domestic comics industry began to mature during this period, and by the 2000s, comics became increasingly intertwined with multimedia entertainments, advertising, and merchandise. Art Square Group emerged as a prominent publisher, producing hit magazines like the semimonthly Gempak, which combined comics with information on anime and games (ACG). Art Square published many comics in book form, creating opportunities for Malaysian artists alongside officially licensed foreign titles. Art Square further expanded the reach of comics by publishing Korean educational manhwa to attract teachers and parents, embracing digital platforms, and organizing competitions to nurture new talent.

Many works from Art Square were heavily influenced by Japanese manga, reflected in their flat coloring styles, characters, settings, and plots. Notable artists included Keith, the creator of Lawak Kampus, a four-panel gag comic about high school life; Kaoru, a prominent shojo manga artist known for Maid Maiden and other works inspired by Japanese trends; and Zint, who created 2 Dudes. In addition to manga, many Malaysian artists drew inspiration from Hong Kong kung fu comics and American superhero comics. Tan Eng Huat, for example, gained international recognition when he was recruited by DC Comics.

Urban Comics, launched in 2001, was a pioneering indie comic magazine. In 2007, its publisher, Muhammad Azar Abdullah, received a government grant to establish PeKOMIK, (Note: Persatuan Pengiat Komik Malaysia) an organization dedicated to promoting networking among comic artists, including amateurs, and fostering comic culture. PeKOMIK, in collaboration with other organizations, organized the MGCCon (Malaysian Games and Comic Convention) in 2012, raising awareness of comic fandom within Malaysian society.

=== Present: the 2010s and Beyond ===
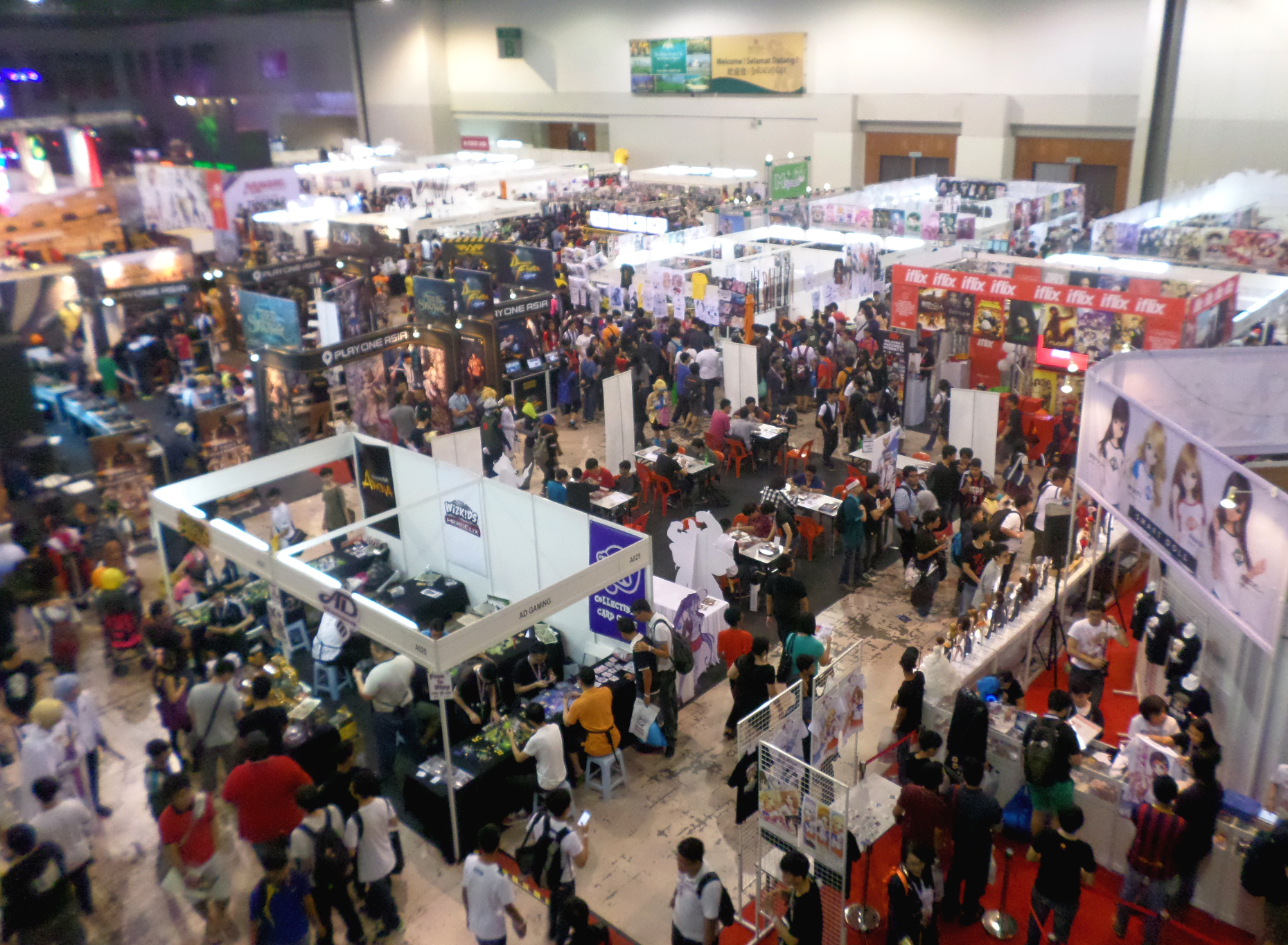
2015 Comic Fiesta, attended by 45,000 people.

Since the 2000s, graphic novels sold in general bookstores have emerged as an alternative to traditional comic books. By 2022, book-form comics had become one of the most popular genres in bookstores. Major comics publishers include Kadokawa Gempak Starz and Komik-M, with both homegrown and Japanese titles enjoying popularity among younger readers. Art Square Group rebranded as Kadokawa Gempak Starz in 2015 after receiving investment from Japan's Kadokawa. The company has since expanded into a multimedia content business encompassing animation, games, novels, and comics. The other major publisher, Komik-M (with "M" standing for Malaysia), is a Malay company. Its main focus is children's comics with an emphasis on Malay cultural education.

According to a 2014 survey, 25.3% of Malaysians listed comics as their preferred reading material, ranking second after magazines, newspapers, and general books. A 2013 survey of university students found that 34.5% favored comics, with 80% reporting that they read comics at least occasionally. The percentage of comic readers showed little variation between ethnic groups.

The advent of digital publishing platforms like webtoons in the 2010s and beyond has fostered a new generation of comic artists. Many artists share their work on social media platforms such as Twitter (now X) and Facebook, with some later get their creation published in book form. Among them, Black Jellyfish stands out for his blog-comics depicting youth culture. Matkomik, one of Malaysia's oldest online comics platforms, has become a vital space for discovering emerging talent and transitioning them into commercial publication.

In Malaysia, as in many other Asian countries, there have traditionally been very few female comic artists. Kaoru, a popular artist and one of the first to be influenced by Japanese manga, helped pave the way for more women to enter the industry. Notably, the first Malaysian artist to win the internationally prestigious Eisner Award was Erica Eng.

In recent years, the educational potential of comics has been a topic of discussion in Malaysia. Studies have explored its effectiveness in improving reading comprehension, moral education, and foreign language learning. Since 2010, the Malaysian Ministry of Education has incorporated graphic novel adaptations of classics such as Black Beauty, Sherlock Holmes, and Journey to the Center of the Earth into English language classes.

== Coventions ==
As of 2023, major ACG events in Malaysia include Comic Fiesta (69,000 attendees, held in December), NIJIGEN EXPO (60,000 attendees, held 2-3 times a year), and AniManGaki (35,000 attendees, held in August). Comic Fiesta, the largest and oldest event of its kind in Southeast Asia, features booths by companies, educational institutions, amateur artists, and cosplayers, while also hosting international guests.

Cosplayers at ACG conventions in Malaysia
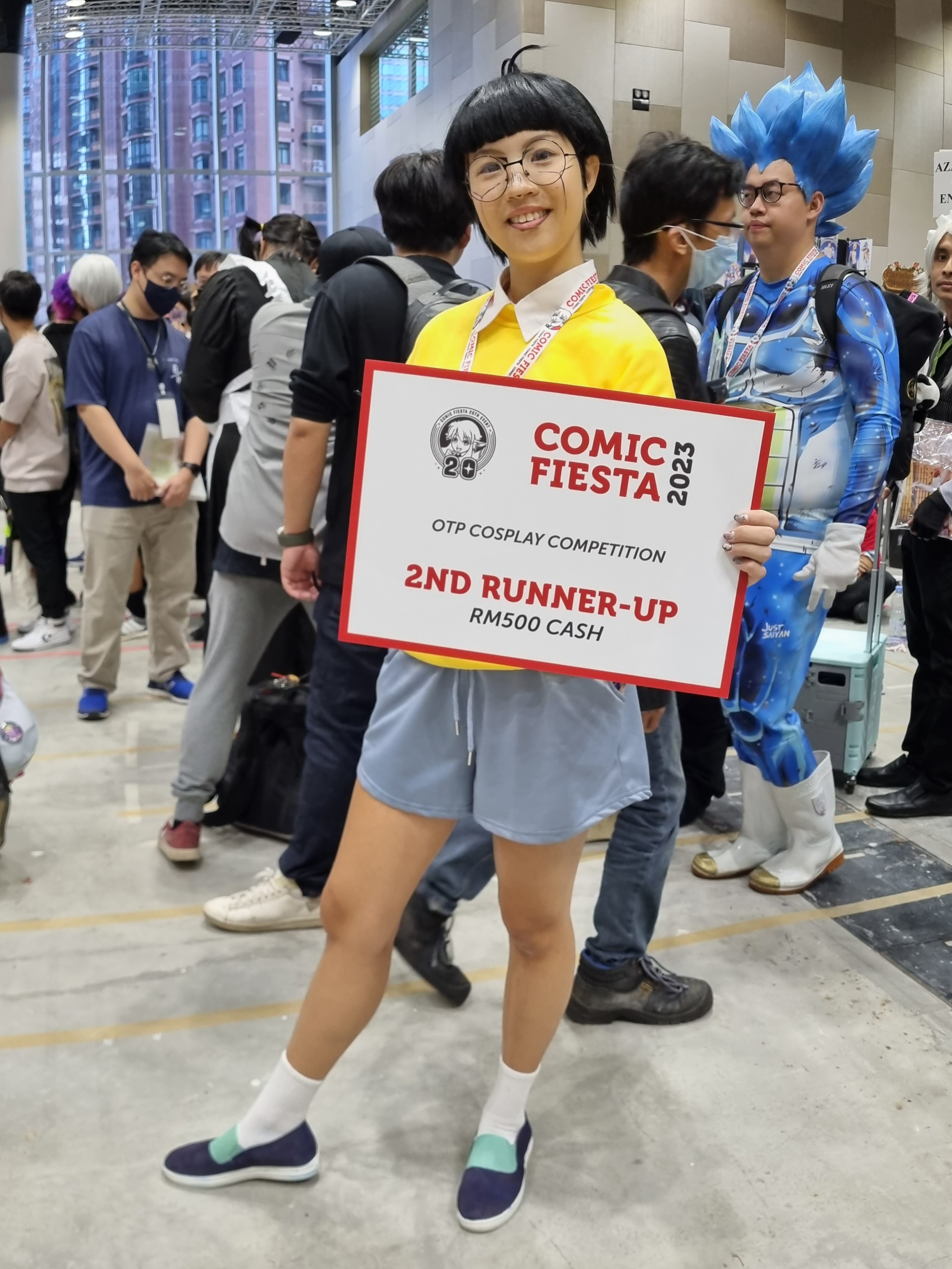
Nobita Nobi (Comic Fiesta 2023)

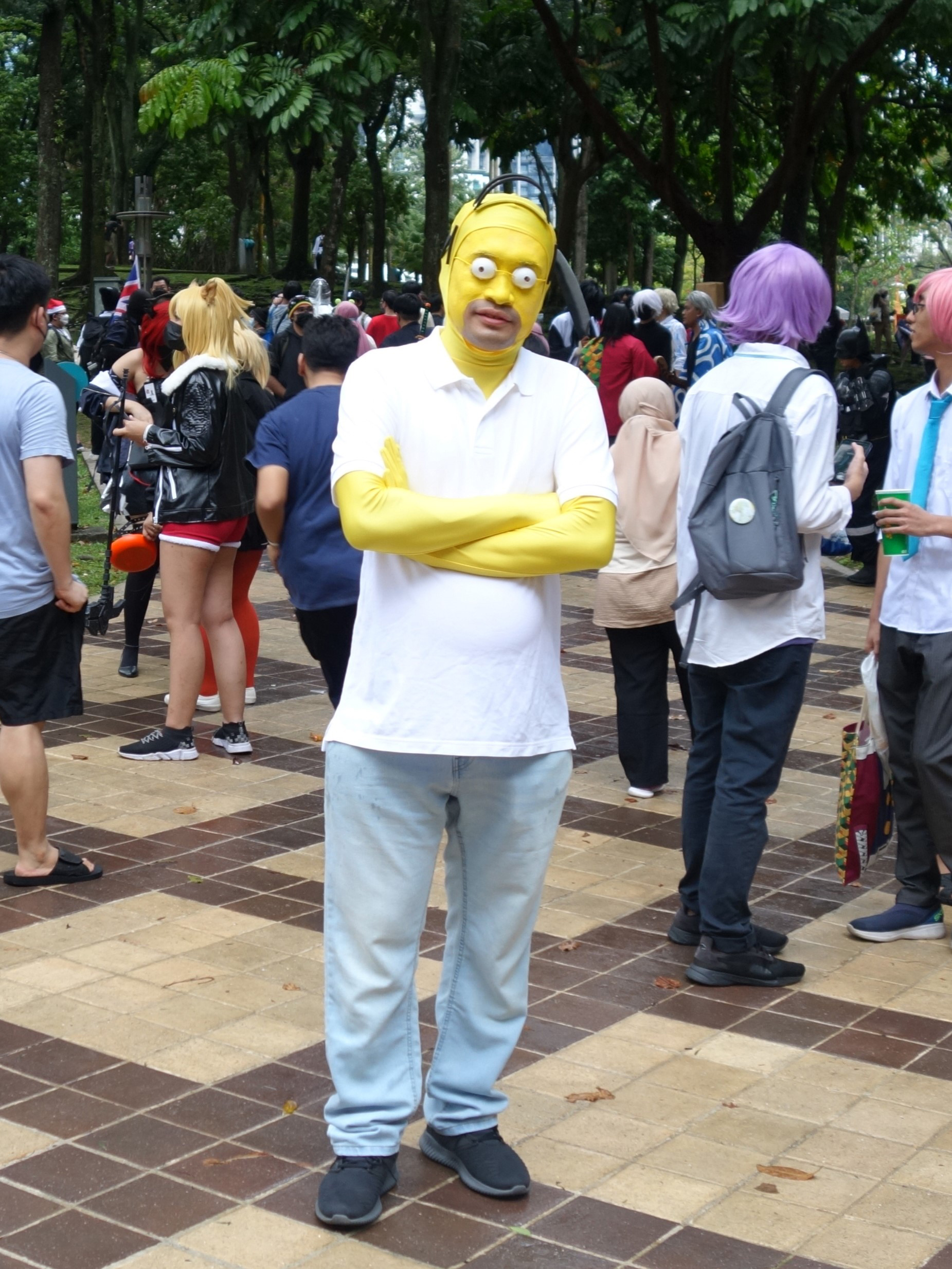
Homer Simpson (Comic Fiesta 2022)

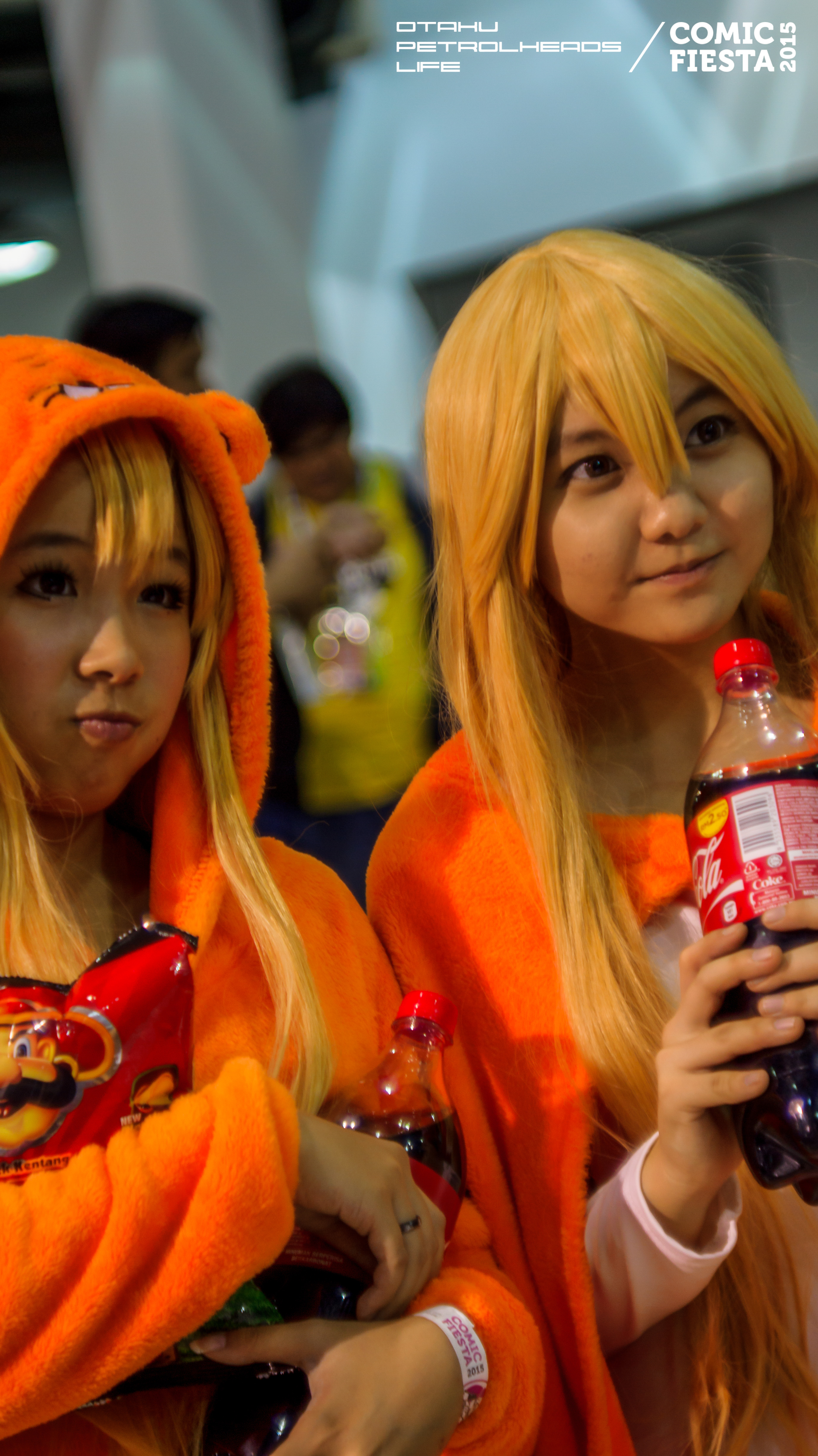
Umaru Doma (Comic Fiesta 2015)

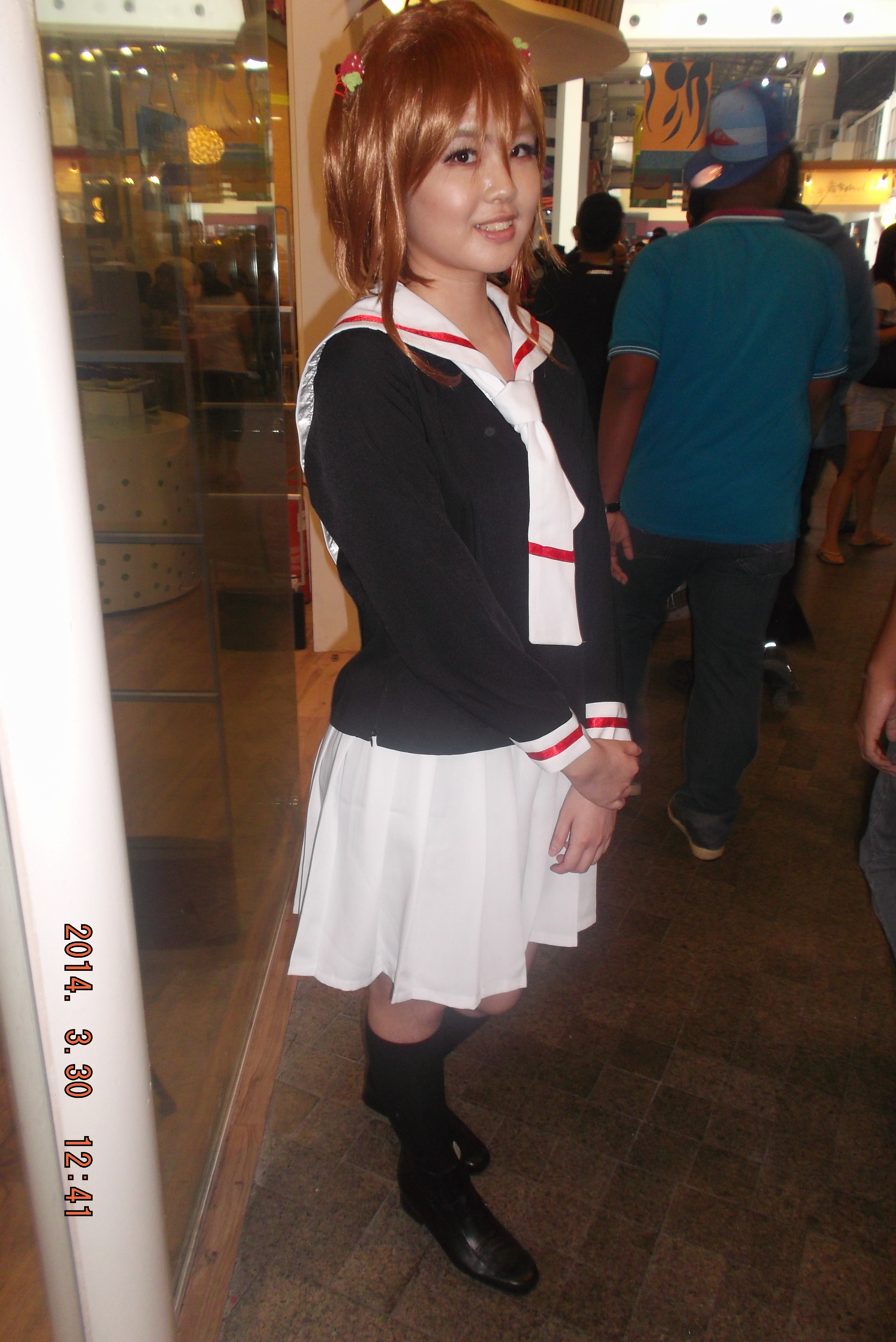
Sakura Kinomoto (Animax Carnival Malaysia 2014)

== Censorship ==
Malaysian publications risk having their licenses revoked by the Ministry of Home Affairs if they fail to comply with the “Publication Guidelines under the Printing Presses and Publications Act 1984.” (Note: Garis Panduan Penerbitan di bawah Akta Mesin Cetak dan Penerbitan 1984) The government adheres to a policy of racial appeasement, enforcing strict regulations on any content deemed offensive or harmful to a specific ethnic group. Criticism of the government is also tightly monitored and often met with warnings. Zunar, who began his career in 1983 in the pages of Gila-Gila, is renowned for his scathing political satire. His work has drawn significant backlash from authorities, including bans on his books detention under the Security Act around 2010.

Malaysian society maintains conservative attitudes toward sexual expression, and the guideline strictly prohibits depictions of nudity (even partial), provocative poses, clothing that reveals body lines or thongs, as well as kissing or intercourse between men and women. Depictions of adultery and homosexuality are also banned. Some works adapt the sensibility of Japanese comics' boys' love genre, which focuses on romance between men, into a relationship between a man and a boyish woman to avoid censorship. Because comics are widely regarded as a medium for children, publishers often self-regulate beyond government guidelines. For instance, publishers may censor depictions of sexually suggestive clothing inspired by Japanese manga and usage of tobacco and alcohol to align with Islamic values, the state religion.

In response to these limitations, some artists since the 2010s have turned to self-publishing to preserve their creative freedom, bypassing the constraints of government regulations and publishers’ guidelines. Amateur artists who sell their works at fan conventions are subject only to the rules set by the conventions themselves. Comic Fiesta, the largest ACG event in Malaysia, regularly hosts hundreds of such artists.

== Characteristics ==
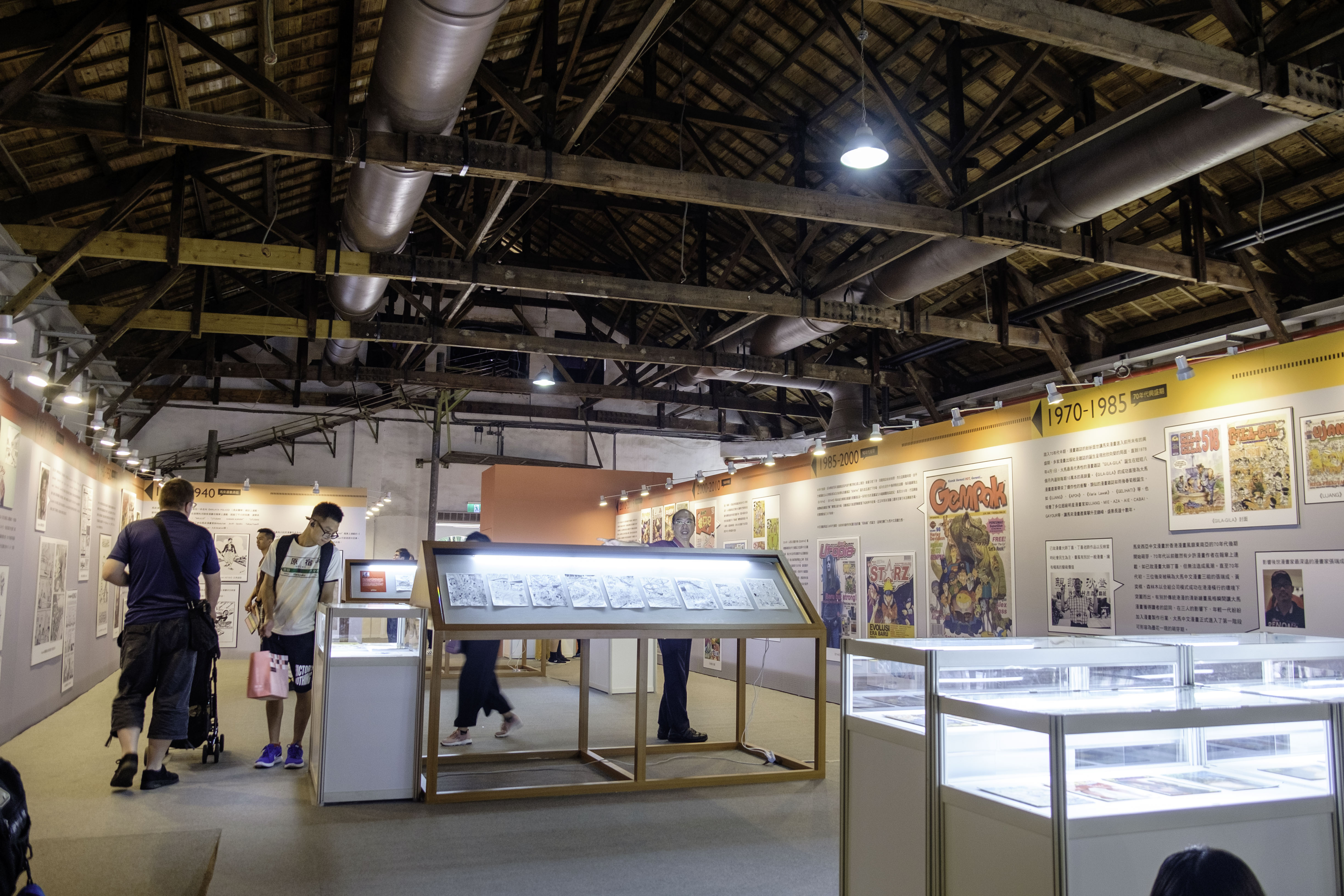
Exhibition of Malaysian comics history at the Taiwan Comic Festival 2019, showcasing magazines such as Gila-Gila and Gempak.

=== Early editorial cartoons ===
Malay political cartoons of the 1930s were straightforward in content, designed to appeal to a readership with varying levels of literacy. They served as tools of social criticism and propaganda, promoting Malay identity formation as well as political and economic empowerment. Formally, these cartoons drew inspiration from traditional literature and featured long captions incorporating proverbs and pantun rhymes. Satirical humor often relied on elements of classical funny stories and animal fables. The Wak Ketok cartoon series from Uthusan Zaman has occasionally been compared to the shadow play Wayang kulit.

=== Malay comics ===
The characters in traditional Malay comics often featured caricatured facial expressions and exaggerated poses as visual gags, with the exception of beautiful, expressionless women who served as the main character's love interests. Identifying a character's ethnic group was important for readers and was typically conveyed through stereotypical external features. In Lat's work, for example, Malays were depicted with low noses, Chinese with small eyes, and Indian with bindis. Costumes like the hijab and sari also further symbolized ethnicity.

Setting often reflected regional characteristics, with kampong (villages) assuming a symbolic role as the source of traditional values. The content largely consisted of short, light, humorous pieces referred to as “loose”. Humor, an important element of Malay culture, drew heavily on traditional theater and literature to elicit laughter. Some cartoonist, however, incorporated serious themes, with nostalgia for traditional culture—exemplified by the works of Lat and Ujang—emerging as a recurring motif.

==== Humor magazines ====
Humor magazines that originated with Gila-Gila (1978) typically spanned 70 to 80 A4-sized pages. They included sections addressing gender and ethnic differences, workplace dynamics, Malay culture, and history, with many cartoonists contributing a single page each. These magazines appealed to a wide audience, attracting both male and female readers across all social groups, including government officials, royalty, businessmen, and university faculty. The language of these magazines was predominantly Malay, and the contributors were almost exclusively Malay.

The critical spirit of humor magazines was rather uncharacteristic to general Malay society. Before the emergence of Gila-Gila in the 1970s, cartoons rarely criticized society, avoiding sensitive topics such as Malay legal dominance. Humor magazine were an exception. Facing fewer censorship constraints, they directly satirized societal issues. Occasional warnings were issued, but outright censorship was rare. The expansion of freedom of expression in satirical cartoons during the 1980s can be attributed to:

- The growing political dominance of the Malay population.
- The inheritance of a tradition of critiquing authority from traditional Malay arts.
- The perception that cartoons as a childish medium, which led to the government to underestimate their political significance.

=== Chinese comics ===
Chinese-language comics publishing began in the 1970s and peaked in the 1980s, with small-format, color-printed comic books primarily featuring short gags. Unlike most comics from the broader Chinese cultural sphere, these works often incorporated elements of Malaysian culture such as traditional houses, games, and food. They also reflected Malaysia's unique linguistic blend, mixing Malay, Chinese, and other languages. However, some critics have noted a lack of distinctive characteristics in the illustration styles.

The rise of Japanese manga in the 1990s led to a decline in the momentum of Chinese-language comics. Since then, the mainstream genre has been shifted to educational comics targeted at children attending Chinese-language elementary schools. One notable success is Gempak Starz's educational comic series X-venture: Primal Powers, (Note: Malay: Siri X-Venture: Dunia haiwan, Chinese: 探险特工队: 万兽之王系列) which became a hit in Japan, selling over 1.9 million copies in total.

=== Malaysian manga ===
The term manga is used to refer to both Japanese comics and local works with similar styles. Major comics publishers, Genpak Starz and Komik-M predominantly produce manga-style local works. In addition to commercial publishing, self-published and fan-made works are common, often shared online or sold at conventions.

Malaysian manga feature characteristic female characters with large eyes, small noses and mouths, with their ethnicity primarily conveyed through costumes. Iconic manga techniques, such as speed lines, are frequently used, while most Malaysian manga are in color unlike their Japanese counterparts. Clean linework, often created using digital tools like Clip Studio Paint, is a hallmark of this generation of artists. Popular genres include slice-of-life stories with elements of fantasy.

==== Manga and cultural identity ====
While the growing popularity of manga has expanded the Malaysian comics market, it has also sparked debates about cultural identity among artists and fans. The construction of a local identity within the context of globalism has been a key issue for issue for Malaysian cartoonists ever since the emergence of Malay comics in the 1930s. As in neighboring countries like the Philippines and Indonesia, some in Malaysia argue that manga “corrupts the rich culture of indigenous comics."

Japanese manga and anime have been described as “culturally odorless” (K. Iwabuchi, 1998), meaning they are not bound to specific cultural or national contexts. In 2011, Gan Sheuo Hui responded that Malaysian manga artists similarly are not “bound by traditional geographical or national constraints on identity,” often adapting Japanese styles to depict an imaginary Malaysia where ethnic tensions are less pronounce. Gan cited Kaoru, a Chinese artist working for Malay magazines, as an example of this trend, noting that manga could serve as a “platform for [ethnic] neutral communication and integration.”

In 2018, Rachel Chan wrote that a “second wave” of Malaysian manga had emerged, which depicted Malaysian social realities through the manga style. She noted that one of the unique aspects of Malaysian manga is its articulation of the ethnicity of characters. Similarly, Iman Junid and Eriko Yamato reported that a generation of Malaysian manga artists exposed to transnational culture had developed nuanced depictions of national, ethnic, and religious identity.

The nature of each publisher is also played a role. Komik-M, which targets a Malay readership, emphasizes Islamic and local cultural elements, while Gempak Starz, aiming for an international audience, tends to suppress depictions of ethnicity to broaden its appeal abroad.

== Archives ==
The Malaysia Cartoon & Comic House, established in Kuala Lumpur in 2017, houses works from World War II to the present.

Comics in Malaysia have received limited academic attention, and there is no systematic collection of materials in research institutes or libraries. The British Library holds a collection of 270 early Malay comic book titles published between 1952 and 1966, acquired through the colonial book deposit system. A microfilm version of this collection has been transferred to the National Library of Malaysia, but these materials remain largely unexamined.

The Malaysia Cartoon & Comic House, founded by PeKomik in Kuala Lumpur in 2017, houses a collection of over 5,000 works spanning from the 1930s to the 1990s as of its opening.

== Works cited ==
- Abd Razak, Anwar Rizziq; Ibnu, Ireena Nasiha (2022). "The Influence of Manga and Anime on New Media Students' Creative Development". EDUCATUM Journal of Social Sciences. 8: 37–45. doi:10.37134/ejoss.vol8.sp.4.2022.
- Chan, Rachel Suet Kay (2018). "Breaking Windows: Malaysian Manga as Dramaturgy of Everyday-Defined Realities". JATI: Journal of Southeast Asian Studies. 23 (2): 205–229. doi:10.22452/jati.vol23no2.10.
- Chan, Rachel Suet Kay (2023). "Towards Manga as Cultural Potpourri: Dramaturgy of Ethnicity and Diversity in Selected Malaysian Manga". Journal of Ethnic and Diversity Studies. 1 (1).
- Chow, Yean Fun; Omar, Hasuria Che; Rahman, Wan Rose Eliza Abdul (2021). "Manga Translation and Censorship Issues in Malaysisa". KEMANUSIAAN the Asian Journal of Humanities. 28 (1): 1–21. doi:10.21315/kajh2021.28.1.1.
- Gallop, Annabel Teh (2022). "Malay Comic Books from the 1950s and 1960s in the British Library". Southeast Asia Library Group Newsletter (54): 44–70.
- Gan, Sheuo Hui (2011). "マレーシアの漫画における混淆性 ─ 少女漫画家カオルのキャリアを通して". 第3回国際学術会議「マンガの社会性―経済主義を超えて―」 (in Japanese).
- Gan, Sheuo Hui (2015). "マレーシアのマンガ ― 少女マンガ家カオル（Kaoru）を通してみる文化混交へのアプローチ". In 大城, 房美 (ed.). 女性マンガ研究: 欧米・日本・アジアをつなぐMANGA (in Japanese). Translated by 鈴木繁. 青弓社. pp. 62–83. ISBN 978-4-7872-3386-8.
- Junid, Iman; Yamato, Eriko (2019). "Manga Influences and Local Narratives: Ambiguous Identification in Comics Production". Creative Industries Journal. 12 (1): 66–85. doi:10.1080/17510694.2018.1542941.
- Kamal, Julina Ismail; Haw, Kam Chin; Bakhir, Norfarizah Mohd (2017). "Sustaining Malay Comic Design: Transformation from Paper to Digital". Proceedings of the 4th Bandung Creative Movement International Conference on Creative Industries 2017 (4th BCM 2017). Vol. 41. pp. 295–298. doi:10.2991/bcm-17.2018.57. ISBN 978-94-6252-478-1.
- Karna, Mustaqim (2014). Reading the Visual of Malaysian Comics: A Study on Comics as an Artform (Doctor of Philosophy thesis). Universiti Teknologi MARA.
- Lent, John A. (2015). "Malaysia". Asian Comics (English, Kindle ed.). University Press of Mississippi. pp. 153–174. ASIN B00QTYUIWG.
- Lim, Cheng Tju (2010). "歴史的記憶のメディアとしてのマンガ/コミックス.シンガポールとマレーシアのコミック". In Jaqueline Berndt (ed.). 世界のコミックスとコミックスの世界 : グローバルなマンガ研究の可能性を開くために (PDF). 国際マンガ研究1 (in Japanese). Translated by 中垣恒太郎. 京都精華大学国際マンガ研究センター. ISBN 978-4-905187-02-8. Archived from the original (PDF) on 2019-01-29.
- Mohd Noor Merican, Ahmad Murad (2020). "Warta Jenaka and Wak Ketok: visualising the other in early Malay editorial cartoons". Jurnal Pengajian Media Malaysia. 22 (2): 31–48.
- Muliyadi, Mahamood (1997). "The Development of Malay Editorial Cartoons". Southeast Asian Journal of Social Science. 25 (1, Special Focus: Cartooning and Comic Art in Southeast Asia): 37–58. doi:10.1163/030382497X00031. JSTOR 24492449.
- Muliyadi, Mahamood (2012). "The Role of Cartoon in the Formation of Asian Community: Art History Analysis". Historia: Jurnal Pendidik Dan Peneliti Sejarah. 13 (1): 119–130. doi:10.17509/historia.v13i1.7703.
- Nasir, Suraya Binti Md (2021). "Understanding Manga as a "Style" through Essay Manga's Multimodal Literacies ― And Its Relations to the Discourse on "local art style" in Malaysian Comics". Border Crossings: The Journal of Japanese-Language Literature Studies. 13 (1): 61–74. doi:10.22628/bcjjl.2021.13.1.61.
- Provencher, Ronald (1990). "Covering Malay Humor Magazines: Satire and Parody of Malaysian Political Dilemmas". Crossroads: An Interdisciplinary Journal of Southeast Asian Studies. 5 (2): 1–25. JSTOR 40860308.
- Rajendra, Thusha Rani (2015). "Multimodality in Malaysian Schools: The Case for the Graphic Novel". The Malaysian Online Journal of Educational Science. 3 (2): 11–20. S2CID 157046409.
- Rifas, Leonard (1984). "Comics in Malaysia". The Comics Journal. 94 (1984–10): 96–101.
- Rosman, Razan; Abdullah, Sarena (2018). "Wak Ketok and the Quest for Malay Identity in 1930s Malaya". Journal of the Malaysian Branch of the Royal Asiatic Society. 91, part 2 (3): 19–47. doi:10.1353/ras.2018.0016.
- Schaar, Torsten; Lapasau, Merry; Fang, Ng Chwee. "Reading Habits of Malaysian Students beyond Classrooms". Studies on Foreign Languages and Cultures. Universiti Putra Malaysia Press. pp. 114–138. ISBN 9789673443703.
- Suraya, MdNasir (2019). Malaysian-ness of Mangaesque Comic: on Cultual Identity and Graphic Expression (Doctor of Fine Arts thesis). Kyoto Seika University.
- Tan, Wan Lee (2014). Study on Contemporary Malaysian Chinese Comic to Investigate Whether the Malaysian Comic Style Has Emerged (BA (Hons) thesis). KBU International College.
- Wong, Wendy Siuyi (2006). "Globalizing Manga: From Japan to Hong Kong and beyond". Mechademia. 1 (1): 23–45. doi:10.1353/mec.0.0060.
- Yamato, Eriko; Eric Krauss, Steven; Tamam, Ezhar; Hassan, Hamisah; Nizam Osman, Mohd (2011). "It's Part of Our Lifestyle: Exploring Young Malaysians' Experiences with Japanese Popular Culture". Keio Communication Review (33): 199–223. S2CID 151804302.
- Yamato, Eriko (2016). "'Growing as a Person': Experiences at Anime, Comics, and Games Fan Events in Malaysia". Journal of Youth Studies. 19 (6): 743–759. doi:10.1080/13676261.2015.1098769.
- 鵜沢, 洋志 (2015). "漫画 Lawak Kampus における効果音としてのオノマトペ―マレー英語の事例―". アジア英語研究 (in Japanese). 17: 6–27. doi:10.50875/asianenglishstudies.17.0_6.
- 塩崎, 悠輝 (2007). "マレーシアのマレー人ムスLim社会における公共圏の形成とイスラーム主義運動" (PDF). 一神教学際研究 (in Japanese). 3: 101–127.
- 坪井, 祐司 (2016). "1930年代初頭の英領マラヤにおけるマレー人性をめぐる論争―ジャウィ新聞『マジュリス』の分析から". 東南アジア －歴史と文化 (in Japanese) (45): 5–24. doi:10.5512/sea.2016.45_5.
- 葉, 蕙 (2013). "マレーシアにおける日本文化 ─ 日本語教育から文学翻訳まで ─". 立命館言語文化研究 (in Japanese). 21 (3): 83–93.
