= Lawak Kampus =

2003 Malaysia comic series

- Genre: Humor, slice of life
- Author: Keith Chong Kah Hwee; Zelo Loo Yong Chen (until December 2003)
- Publisher: Kadokawa Gempak Starz
- Magazine: (Malaysia) Gempak (Malaysia) Comic King
- Original run: June 2003 – ongoing
- Lawak Kingdom; Campus Junior: 100% Power

Kuso High School, or commonly known as Lawak Kampus (Malay: Lawak Kampus, Chinese: 秀逗高校) is an ongoing Malaysian comic series created by Keith Chong Kah Hwee and Zelo Loo Yong Chen. The series began in 2003, published by Kadokawa Gempak Starz.

Lawak Kampus is known as the one of the few long-running comic series in Malaysia. In the 2023 edition of the Malaysia Book of Records, it was recognized as the longest-running four-panel comic strip series. The series has also been published in multiple editions in China, Indonesia, Thailand, Singapore, and other countries.

In its early years, Lawak Kampus primarily focused on the everyday habits and problems experienced by Malaysian secondary school students. However, as the series transitioned to full-color comics and introduced new characters, its scope expanded to cover a wider range of situations. The series also incorporated more elements of parody, absurd humor, and slapstick comedy to depict various issues faced by contemporary Malaysian teenagers.

Lawak Kampus also features real-life mascots, anime characters, entrepreneurs, and well-known personalities to enhance its comedic atmosphere.

== Inspiration ==
The creation of Lawak Kampus was not based on a fully planned overarching storyline. It was centered on the concept of sickolah, a portmanteau of the English word “sick” and the Malay word sekolah (“school”). The series uses the four-panel comic format to depict students’ everyday lives while highlighting the distinctive personalities and characteristics of its characters.

== Production ==
In 2003, Keith Chong joined the Kadokawa Gempak Starz as a manga assistant. Lawak Kampus was originally developed by Michael Chuah, however, the project was handed over to Keith Chong and Zelo Loo due to Michael Chuah's busy work schedule. Around April 2003, Keith Chong collaborated with Zelo Loo, who was the series’ main artist at the time, to produce the Lawak Kampus comic series.

In June 2003, Lawak Kampus began serialization in the Malay and Chinese language comic magazines, appearing in issue 85 of Gempak and the first issue of Comic King, respectively. During December 2003, Zelo Loo left Kadokawa Gempak Starz to pursue studies in Australia, leaving Keith Chong as the sole cartoonist.

In August 2004, the first Malay-language one-volume edition of Lawak Kampus was published. The first Chinese-language one-volume edition went on sale in December 2004.

In 2008, Lawak Kampus was officially licensed for an overseas market for the first time and began serialization in Comic World (Chinese: 漫画世界), published by Guangzhou Comicfans Culture (Chinese: 广州漫友出版社), China. During October 2008, the first Lawak Kampus English-language one-volume edition, known as Kuso High School was released. In 2014, Malay-language super-thick collected editions, Lawak Kampus: Kompilasi Mantap was released and marked its milestones for 100,000 copies sales. In 2015, the Lawak Kampus series collaborated with seven other cartoonists and their assistants to produce the short comic series, Lawak Kingdom.

In 2023, Lawak Kampus light novel series was released under Kadokawa Gempak Starz's sub-brand, “Magic Bean” (Chinese: 魔豆原创). On the next year, Lawak Kampus launched the children's educational comic series Campus Junior: 100% Power under the same publishing house's sub-brand, “Learn More!” (Chinese: 浩学堂).

=== Copyright infringement incident ===
In late June 2009, readers of the Macau-based Va Kio Daily discovered that the newspaper had allegedly infringed the copyright of Lawak Kampus. Some content from Lawak Kampus Revive had also been published in the newspaper, with the serialization running from mid-May to late June. The comic was credited to the author name “Xiaosisi Yu Nuomici” (Chinese: 小四四與糯米慈), while the original computer-lettered dialogue was replaced with handwritten lettering.

After the incident, the Macao Animation and Manga Cultural Industry Association intervened. In addition to contacting the newspaper's management to negotiate the matter, the association held a press conference titled “Confronting Intellectual Property Rights” on 10 July 2009, calling on all sectors of society to pay greater attention to copyright infringement.

== Media ==
=== Comic ===
==== Lawak Kampus ====
===== One-volume edition =====
No.	Title	Original release date	Chinese and English release date
1	秀逗高校; Kuso High School; Lawak Kampus	July 2004; 9789832985174	December 2004 (Chinese); 9789832985402 (Chinese); October 2008 (English); 9789833882601 (English)
2	秀逗高校：恶搞篇; Kuso High School Rebound; Lawak Kampus Rebound	November 2005; 9789832985693	June 2006 (Chinese); 9789832985884 (Chinese); January 2009 (English); 9789833882939/9789810822439 (English)
3	秀逗高校：一番篇; Kuso High School Revive; Lawak Kampus Revive	March 2007; 9789833882106	April 2007 (Chinese); 9789833882120 (Chinese); May 2009 (English); 9789675288357/9789810831479 (English)
4	秀逗高校：激斗篇; Kuso High School League; Lawak Kampus League	April 2008; 9789833882441	June 2008 (Chinese); 9789833882502 (Chinese); January 2010 (English); 9789675288746/9789810847678 (English)
5	秀逗高校：登入篇; Kuso High School Log In; Lawak Kampus Log In	March 2009; 9789675288166	July 2009 (Chinese); 9789675288470 (Chinese); April 2010 (English); 9789675288838/9789810851828 (English)
6	秀逗高校：情义篇; Lawak Kampus Teamwork	November 2009; 9789675288623	February 2010 (Chinese); 9789675288784 (Chinese); Not released (English)
7	秀逗高校：反斗篇; Lawak Kampus Move On	June 2010; 9789675288920	November 2010 (Chinese); 9789673850129 (Chinese); Not released (English)
8	秀逗高校8; Lawak Kampus Connection	November 2010; 9789673850082	June 2011 (Chinese); 9789673850358 (Chinese); Not released (English)
9	秀逗高校9; Lawak Kampus 9	February 2011; 9789673850211	August 2011 (Chinese); 9789673850402 (Chinese); Not released (English)
10	秀逗高校10; Lawak Kampus 10	May 2011; 9789673850327	October 2011 (Chinese); 9789673850501 (Chinese); Not released (English)
11	秀逗高校11; Lawak Kampus 11	August 2011; 9789673850426	December 2011 (Chinese); 9789673850563 (Chinese); Not released (English)
12	秀逗高校12; Lawak Kampus 12	November 2011; 9789673850532	February 2012 (Chinese); 9789673850617 (Chinese); Not released (English)
13	秀逗高校13; Lawak Kampus 13	March 2012; 9789673850709	May 2012 (Chinese); 9789673850853 (Chinese); Not released (English)
14	秀逗高校14; Lawak Kampus 14	June 2012; 9789673850938	July 2012 (Chinese); 9789673850990 (Chinese); Not released (English)
15	秀逗高校15; Lawak Kampus 15	September 2012; 9789673851195	November 2012 (Chinese); 9789673851348 (Chinese); Not released (English)
16	秀逗高校16; Lawak Kampus 16	December 2012; 9789673851430	January 2013 (Chinese); 9789673851515 (Chinese); Not released (English)
17	秀逗高校17; Lawak Kampus 17	March 2013; 9789673851676	May 2013 (Chinese); 9789673851799 (Chinese); Not released (English)
18	秀逗高校18; Lawak Kampus 18	July 2013; 9789673851973	July 2013 (Chinese); 9789673852079 (Chinese); Not released (English)
19	秀逗高校19; Lawak Kampus 19	October 2013; 9789673852413	October 2013 (Chinese); 9789673852468 (Chinese); Not released (English)
20	秀逗高校20; Lawak Kampus 20	February 2014; 9789673852826	February 2014 (Chinese); 9789673852840 (Chinese); Not released (English)
21	秀逗高校21; Lawak Kampus 21	June 2014; 9789673853618	July 2014 (Chinese); 9789673853656 (Chinese); Not released (English)
22	秀逗高校22; Lawak Kampus 22	October 2014; 9789673854325	November 2014 (Chinese); 9789673854417 (Chinese); Not released (English)
23	秀逗高校23; Lawak Kampus 23	February 2015; 9789673854769	March 2015 (Chinese); 9789673854868 (Chinese); Not released (English)
24	秀逗高校24; Lawak Kampus 24	July 2015; 9789673855599	September 2015 (Chinese); 9789673855872 (Chinese); Not released (English)
25	秀逗高校25; Lawak Kampus 25	December 2015; 9789673856510	February 2016 (Chinese); 9789673856817 (Chinese); Not released (English)
26	秀逗高校26; Lawak Kampus 26	April 2016; 9789673857234	June 2016 (Chinese); 9789673857678 (Chinese); Not released (English)
27	秀逗高校27; Lawak Kampus 27	October 2016; 9789673858910	October 2016 (Chinese); 9789673859061 (Chinese); Not released (English)
28	秀逗高校28; Lawak Kampus 28	December 2016; 9789674780111	February 2017 (Chinese); 9789674780470 (Chinese); Not released (English)
29	秀逗高校29; Lawak Kampus 29	April 2017; 9789674781309	June 2017 (Chinese); 9789674781880 (Chinese); Not released (English)
30	秀逗高校30; Lawak Kampus 30	August 2017; 9789674782788	September 2017 (Chinese); 9789674783143 (Chinese); Not released (English)
31	秀逗高校31; Lawak Kampus 31	December 2017; 9789674783990	February 2018 (Chinese); 9789674784362 (Chinese); Not released (English)
32	秀逗高校32; Lawak Kampus 32	April 2018; 9789674785581	June 2018 (Chinese); 9789674786236 (Chinese); Not released (English)
33	秀逗高校33; Lawak Kampus 33	November 2018; 9789674788124	January 2019 (Chinese); 9789674788681 (Chinese); Not released (English)
34	秀逗高校34; Lawak Kampus 34	March 2019; 9789674789596	May 2019 (Chinese); 9789674789817 (Chinese); Not released (English)
35	秀逗高校35; Lawak Kampus 35	August 2019; 9789672341291	September 2019 (Chinese); 9789672341529 (Chinese); Not released (English)
36	秀逗高校36; Lawak Kampus 36	December 2019; 9789672381549	March 2020 (Chinese); 9789672431206 (Chinese); Not released (English)
37	秀逗高校37; Lawak Kampus 37	June 2020; 9789672431930	September 2020 (Chinese); 9789672471776 (Chinese); Not released (English)
38	秀逗高校38; Lawak Kampus 38	September 2020; 9789672471943	November 2020 (Chinese); 9789672926436 (Chinese); Not released (English)
39	秀逗高校39; Lawak Kampus 39	December 2020; 9789672926818	February 2021 (Chinese); 9789672993063 (Chinese); Not released (English)
40	秀逗高校40; Lawak Kampus 40	April 2021; 9789672993957	May 2021 (Chinese); 9789672849261 (Chinese); Not released (English)
41	秀逗高校41; Lawak Kampus 41	September 2021; 9789672818328	October 2021 (Chinese); 9789672718215 (Chinese); Not released (English)
42	秀逗高校42; Lawak Kampus 42	December 2021; 9789672718918	February 2022 (Chinese); 9789672790389 (Chinese); Not released (English)
43	秀逗高校43; Lawak Kampus 43	May 2022; 9789670028262	June 2022 (Chinese); 9789670028644 (Chinese); Not released (English)
44	秀逗高校44; Lawak Kampus 44	September 2022; 9789670056210	October 2022 (Chinese); 9789670056470 (Chinese); Not released (English)
45	秀逗高校45; Lawak Kampus 45	December 2022; 9786297522050	February 2023 (Chinese); 9786297522302 (Chinese); Not released (English)
46	秀逗高校46; Lawak Kampus 46	May 2023; 9786297563473	June 2023 (Chinese); 9786297563732 (Chinese); Not released (English)
47	秀逗高校47; Lawak Kampus 47	September 2023; 9786294790452	October 2023 (Chinese); 9786294790735 (Chinese); Not released (English)
48	秀逗高校48; Lawak Kampus 48	January 2024; 9786294791428	February 2024 (Chinese); 9786294791718 (Chinese); Not released (English)
49	秀逗高校49; Lawak Kampus 49	May 2024; 9786294792593	June 2024 (Chinese); 9786294792845 (Chinese); Not released (English)
50	秀逗高校50; Lawak Kampus 50	September 2024; 9786294793606	October 2024 (Chinese); 9786294793866 (Chinese); Not released (English)
51	秀逗高校51; Lawak Kampus 51	January 2025; 9786294794801	March 2025 (Chinese); 9786294795242 (Chinese); Not released (English)
52	秀逗高校52; Lawak Kampus 52	May 2025; 9786294796393	July 2025 (Chinese); 9786294796812 (Chinese); Not released (English)
53	秀逗高校53; Lawak Kampus 53	October 2025; 9786294797758	November 2025 (Chinese); 9786294798106 (Chinese); Not released (English)
54	秀逗高校54; Lawak Kampus 54	March 2026; 9786294799226	May 2026 (Chinese); 9786294799998 (Chinese); Not released (English)
55	秀逗高校55; Lawak Kampus 55	July 2026; 9786294550834	September 2026 (Chinese); 9786294551381 (Chinese); Not released (English)

===== Kompilasi Mantap =====
No.	Title	Original release date	Chinese release date
1	秀逗高校精装版; Lawak Kampus: Kompilasi Mantap	May 2011; 9789673850372	July 2015; 9789673855414
2	秀逗高校完全版2; Lawak Kampus: Kompilasi Mantap 2	April 2014; 9789673853120	June 2016; 9789673857784
3	秀逗高校完全版3; Lawak Kampus: Kompilasi Mantap 3	April 2017; 9789674781064	June 2018; 9789674785963
4	Lawak Kampus: Kompilasi Mantap 4	March 2020; 9789672381884	Not released
5	Lawak Kampus: Kompilasi Mantap 5	February 2022; 9789672790174	Not released
6	Lawak Kampus: Kompilasi Mantap 6	May 2025; 9786294795990	Not released

==== Lawak Kingdom ====
No.	Title	Original release date	Chinese release date
1	秀逗联盟; Lawak Kingdom	April 2014; 9789673852901	? 2015; 9789673854721
2	秀逗联盟2; Lawak Kingdom 2	July 2014; 9789673853717	? 2015; 9789673855865
3	秀逗联盟3; Lawak Kingdom 3	January 2015; 9789673854639	? 2016; 9789673857241
4	秀逗联盟4; Lawak Kingdom 4	May 2015; 9789673855124	? 2016; 9789673858903
5	秀逗联盟5; Lawak Kingdom 5	October 2015; 9789673856039	April 2017; 9789674781088
6	秀逗联盟6; Lawak Kingdom 6	July 2016; 9789673858163	October 2017; 9789674783310

==== Campus Junior: 100% Power ====
No.	Title	Original release date	Malay and English release date
1	Ikan Yu & Terumbu Karang; Sharks & Corals 认识海洋：寻找大白鲨	November 2024; 9786294794030	November 2024 (Malay); 9786294794023 (Malay); July 2025 (English); 9786294797000 (English)
2	Banjir & Kilat; Here Comes The Flood! 认识气候：洪水来了！	November 2024; 9786294794108	November 2024 (Malay); 9786294794061 (Malay); July 2025 (English); 9786294797079 (English)
3	Fotosintesis & Bunga Gergasi; Do Rafflesia Flowers Eat Humans? 认识植物：大王花会吃人吗？	November 2024; 9786294794115	December 2024 (Malay); 9786294794375 (Malay); July 2025 (English); 9786294797086 (English)
4	Haiwan & Glasier Di Dua Kutub; The Spectacular World Of Snow 认识极地：冰雪世界大不同	November 2024; 9786294794122	December 2024 (Malay); 9786294794382 (Malay); July 2025 (English); 9786294797093 (English)
5	Alamak, Virus Datang! Viruses Incoming! 认识病毒：糟糕，病毒来袭！	February 2025; 9786294795129	April 2025 (Malay); 9786294795891 (Malay); March 2026 (English); 9786294798984 (English)
6	Kembara Padang Pasir & Makam Purba! Treasure-Hunting In The Desert! 认识沙漠：深入沙漠，探寻古墓！	February 2025; 9786294795211	April 2025 (Malay); 9786294795907 (Malay); March 2026 (English); 9786294798991 (English)
7	Kapal Selam & Rahsia Laut Dalam; What's Under The Deep Blue Sea? 认识深海：万米深海有什么？	May 2025; 9786294796331	August 2025 (Malay); 9786294797109 (Malay); June 2026 (English); 9786294550254 (English)
8	Dron, Berlepas! Drones, Prepare For Launch! 认识科技：无人机，起飞啦！	May 2025; 9786294796348	August 2025 (Malay); 9786294797192 (Malay); June 2026 (English); 9786294550261 (English)
9	Dunia Burung Menakjubkan! 认识鸟类：出发吧，候鸟！	August 2025; 9786294797239	November 2025 (Malay); 9786294798045 (Malay)
10	Darah Kita Berbeza! 认识血型：我们的血不一样？	August 2025; 9786294797246	November 2025 (Malay); 9786294798052 (Malay)
11	Jangan Risau, Kereta Kabel Sangat Selamat! 认识交通：不怕，缆车很安全！	November 2025; 9786294798298	April 2026 (Malay); 9786294799479 (Malay)
12	Ajaibnya Matahari! 认识太阳：太阳的神奇魔法	November 2025; 9786294798304	April 2026 (Malay); 9786294799554 (Malay)
13	Kembara Hebat Deria Rasa! 味觉大冒险！：认识感官	February 2026; 9786294799042	August 2026 (Malay); 9786294550902 (Malay)
14	Misi Gempur Kulat! 防霉大作战！：认识健康	February 2026; 9786294799059	August 2026 (Malay); 9786294550933 (Malay)
15	TBA 现金会变身？！：认识钱币	May 2026; 9786294799899	TBA
16	TBA 下太阳雨啦！：认识气象	May 2026; 9786294799905	TBA
17	TBA 呜啊啊，它们来了！：认识昆虫	August 2026; 9786294551046	TBA
18	TBA 叮！魔术时间到！：认识辐射	August 2026; 9786294551053	TBA

==== Lawak Kampus: School Daze ====
No.	Title	Release date	ISBN
1	Lawak Kampus: School Daze 01	October 2023	9789815156508
2	Lawak Kampus: School Daze 02	October 2023	9789815156607
3	Lawak Kampus: School Daze 03	November 2023	9789815156737

=== Animation ===
==== Lawak Kampus: School Daze ====
On 1 September 2023, the animated series Lawak Kampus: School Daze premiered in Malaysia and other Asia-Pacific regions. The series was produced by Lil Critter Workshop. Animated shorts in English, Malay, and other Asia-Pacific languages were also released on the LK School Daze YouTube channel and broadcast on Astro Ceria.

===== Season 1 =====
A total of 52 episodes of Lawak Kampus: School Daze had been release.

1. "Growing Pains" (Akil Baligh)
2. "Sports Day" (Hari Sukan)
3. "Zero's Puppet/Talk to the Hand" (Tangan Kosong)
4. "Call Me Antoinette" (Aku Dan Antoinette)
5. "Lunchtime Revolution" (Revolusi Kantin)
6. "Hayfever Dreams" (Dilema Bernanah)
7. "The Cheat Sheet" (Teknik Meniru)
8. "The Great Unknown" (Gejala "Unknown")
9. "The After Party" (Parti Puaka)
10. "Right at Home" (Tabiat Busuk)
11. "Art Show" (Lukisan Saya)
12. "Mission Impossibru" (Misi Mustahil-lah)
13. "Prince Charming" (Putera Idaman)
14. "Robbery Racing" (Main Kejar-Kejar)
15. "Ami or Yumi" (Nama Saya Ami)
16. "King George" (Beruk Siapa)
17. "Clear and Present Danger" (Hadiah Berbahaya)
18. "Resolution Solution" (Solusi Resolusi)
19. "Pedas" (Pedas)
20. "Drama Queen" (Ratu Drama)
21. "The Alter-Ego's" (Aksi Adiwira)
22. "Parkourate" (Parkourate)
23. "GodXena" (GodXena)
24. "I Wish..." (Jikalau Daku)
25. "Strategi" (Strategi)
26. "The Principal's Friend" (Kawan Pengetua)
27. "MEOW-ssion ImPAWsible" (Si Kuching Bertanduk)
28. "Monthly Special" (Istimewa Bulanan)
29. "Game On!" (Game On!)
30. "Fit Body Fit Mind" (Jejaka Idaman)
31. "The BeBlob" (Krisis Bernanah)
32. "Home Alone" (Beraya Kat Rumah)
33. "The Date" (Jom Date)
34. "Tree Huggers" (Pewira Bumi)
35. "The Alter-Ego's Part 2" (Aksi Adiwira (Part 2))
36. "Oh My Lisa" (Mana Lisa)
37. "Mama's Boys" (Anak Mama)
38. "The Staff Room" (Bilik Rahsia)
39. "Friender" (Friender)
40. "Robot Vanness" (Robot Vanness)
41. "Wifi or Die!" (Wifi Atau Mental)
42. "Daddy's Girls" (Anak Ayah)
43. "Class Photo" (Photo Kelas)
44. "Smellraiser" (Si Wangi?)
45. "Career Day" (Hari Kerjaya)
46. "Bad Hair Day" (Hari Keganasan Rambut)
47. "Chatterbox" (Si Mulut Bising)
48. "Si Kucing's Revenge" (Dendam Si Kucing)
49. "Zero Love" (Cinta Zero)
50. "Back(side) to the Future" (Waktu Silam Untuk Masa Depan)
51. "Bepopple Tea" (The Bobapop)
52. "Hormone Harmonizer" (Mesin Hormon Ajaib)

===== Season 2 =====
To be announced.
