= Yong Mun Sen =

Malaysian painter (1896–1962)

Yong Mun Sen (10 January 1896 – 30 September 1962) was a Malaysian artist and one of the founders of Nanyang Academy of Fine Arts in Singapore, then Malaya. Born Yong Yen Lang in Kuching, Sarawak, he changed his name to Yong Mun Sen in 1922.

== Early life ==
Born in Kuching, Sarawak where his father ran a coconut estate, in 1901 Sen went to Dabu County in Meizhou City, Kwangtung (now Guangdong) Province in China for schooling in brush use and calligraphy and returned to Kuching in 1910. Sen always spoke of how seeing a Japanese artist painting with watercolors had made an indelible impression on him.

He is widely known as the Father of Malaysian Painting. Although trained in formal Chinese brush painting and calligraphy in China, as an artist he was drawn to watercolours and later oils.

Sen returned to China in 1914. His paintings during this visit were marked by a grandiose theme. He painted lions and tigers, images that were hugely popular with the warlords of the time. He married Lam Sek Foong in 1916, and returned to Sarawak in 1917.

He settled in Penang in 1922, where he had his own art studios on Penang Road and later Northam Road.

Mun Sen is noted for his watercolour landscape paintings, which incorporate influences from Chinese art resulting in more airy and generalised compositions rather than in more detailed or factual depictions. Since his death in 1962, his works have retained an important and honoured place in Malaysian art.

Two of his children would follow in his footsteps, Yong Cheng Wah and Yong Kheng Wah. Both are well-established artists in their own media.

== Career ==
Yong Mun Sen opened a photography business in Penang, and he also worked as a painter. In 1922, he established Tai Koon Art Studio on Chulia Street . After that, he moved the studio to Penang Road and changed its name to Mun Sen in 1930.

Mun Sen Studio sold art materials, including things from Europe to meet local demand. It also provied frame-making services and art classes.Its framing business including mirror frames imported from Italy and Shanghai. The studio also displayed and sold paintings, with the walls covered in works by Mr.Yang.These works included oil paintings of local landscapes and Malay village life, as well as a large animal painting. Chinese-style paintings were also available for sale.

The studio became a popular meeting place for Yong’s artist friends. These included Tay Hooi Keat, Kuo Ju Ping, Khaw Sia, Lee Cheng Yong, Abdullah Ariff, Chuah Thean Teng and Zhong Bai Mu. Family interviews cited by Simon Soon also describe the role of Yong’s wife, Lam Sek Foong, in the business. She is responsible for sales and the daily operations of the studio.

Yong Mun Sen also briefly work as a photojournalist and edited a pictorial supplement for the Chinese newspaper “Chunam Morning Daily (中南晨報)”.The supplement appeared only once. The reproduced in Simon Soon’s chapter is dated 4 September 1930.This issue spans 4 full pages and includes brief photo captions, scrapbook style photo arrangements, and editorial cartoons.The photographs were mainly taken by Yong himself and often showed sporting events by Chinese language schools in Penang. He also drew most of the cartoons included in the supplement.

In 1929, Yong Mun Sen was the vice president of Singapore Society of Chinese Artists (SOCA).

Yong Mun Sen was a fouding member and vice president of the Penang Chinese Art Club. Other fouding in art club include president Lee Cheng Yong, and treasurer Tay Hooi Keat. The club organized an eaarly exhibition of paintings and photographs, with contributions form artists aaacross Malaya and SIngapore. The paintings in exhibition included works in wstern realist and Post Impressionist styles, as well as traditional Chinesse brush paintings. In 1937, members of the club were invited participate in an exhibition with the Penang Impressionists.

He also proposed to establish a fine arts school, now known as Nanyang Academy of Fine Arts (NAFA). Through an annual meeting hosted in 1937, the idea was subsequently shelved away due to the lack of funding. Tan See Siang helped with the funding of the institution and thus NAFA was then established in 1938, with Lim Hak Tai becoming NAFA's Founding Principal and Yong Mun Sen becoming one of the founders of the institution alongside his peers of SOCA.

== Exhibitions ==
- 1931 — Group exhibition at the Chinese Town Hall in mid of February. Yong Mun Sen exhibited with other artists.
- 1936 — Ying Ying Art Exhibition, a group exhibition at Li Teik School 5th Branch, happened from 2–4 April. Yong Mun Sen and Lee Cheng Yong selected the works, and Yong led the stallation. He contributed 20 oil paintings, 15 watercolours, 12 photographic works and 3 sculptures.
- 1937 — M.A.H.A. Exhibition, a group exhibition and competition.Yong Mun Sen won first place in Portraiture and second place in Miscellaneous in the professional photography category.
- 2023 —Yong Mun Sen in Nanyang, comprehensive retrospective exhibition at Ngee Ann Kong Si Galleries 1&2 in 11 February -7 May 2023
