= A. Kasim Abas =

Malaysian watercolor artist

A.Kasim Abas
- Born: Abu Kasim Bin Abas; 1948 (age 77–78); Port Dickson, Negeri Sembilan, Malaysia
- Known for: Watercolours, Pen & Ink

Signature
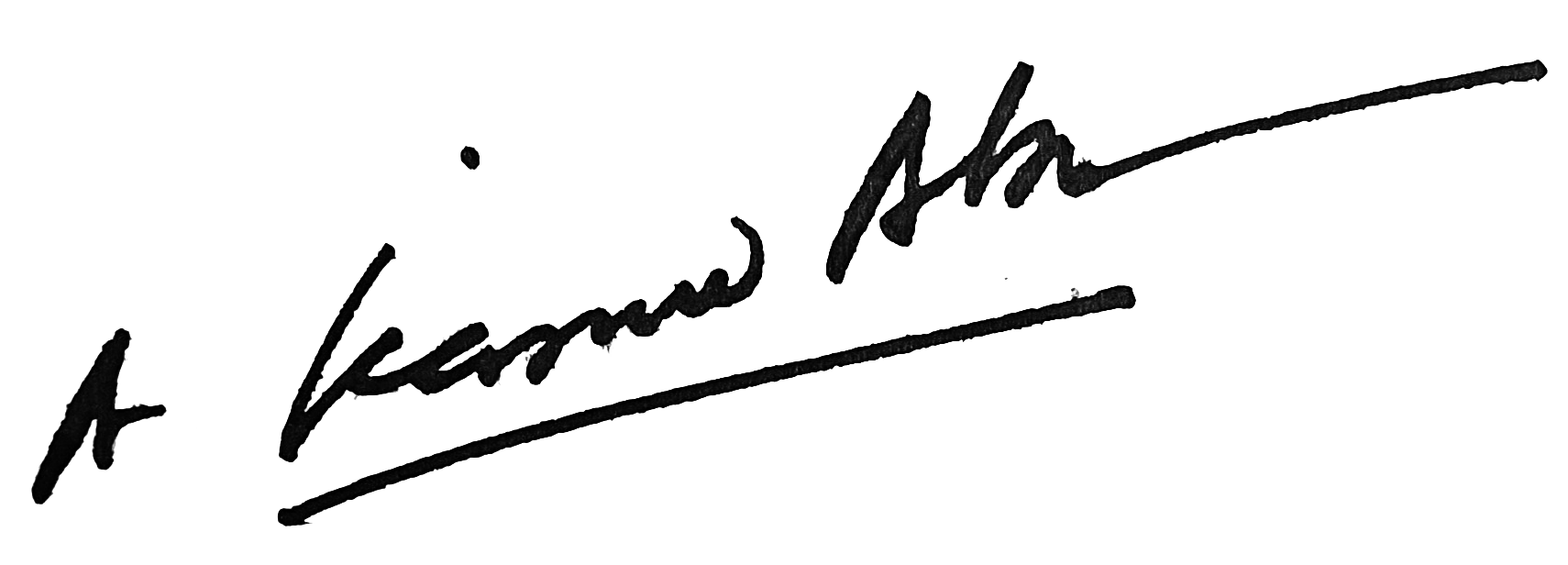

A. Kasim Abas (born 1948) is a Malaysian watercolour artist.

== Early life and education ==
Abas was born in 1948 in Negeri Sembilan Malaysia. He was raised in a small fishing village to a Malaysian mother and Javanese father in the town of Port Dickson. He later went to the Government English School and completed his MCE (Malaysian Certificate of Education) and SC (Senior Cambridge) . He later admitted into a Teachers College in Seremban.

== Career ==
Upon graduating from Teachers College in Seremban, he is sent to a remote areas in Malaysia to teach students. In his isolations teaching at remote locations, he started drawing and painting in his free time. He later went to college to specialized in teaching art. While in college, he participated the Asian College Exhibition in Singapore which encourages him to pursuit painting professionally. In 1985, under the Patronage of the Malaysian Yang di-Pertuan Agong he exhibited in Washington DC and later with the patronage of the Malaysian Prime Minister Mahathir Mohamad, he exhibited in New York City; organised by the Mrs Nicoline Lopes. In 1992, he retired from teaching and pursuit painting full-time.

== Art style ==
A. Kasim Abas is a self taught artist known for his draughtsmanship and detailed watercolours drawings. He is adept at works with architecture, figurative works, sceneries and traditional crafts. A. Kasim Abas mostly works on commission based projects and rarely participates in exhibitions due to the slow process of him creating his paintings.

=== Publications ===
- 2005 | Sarawak Sketchbook - Illustrator
- 2006 | Landmark of Perak - Illustrator
- 2011 | The encyclopedia of Malaysia - The Rulers Of Malaysia - Illustrator

=== Exhibitions ===
- 1982 | American Express Charity Art, The Regent, with Khalil Ibrahim & Yap Hong Ngee Kuala Lumpur, Malaysia
- 1984 | Standard Chartered Watercolour Exhibition, Hotel Equatorial, with Mohamed Zain Idris Kuala Lumpur, Malaysia
- 1985 | Washington DC, United States
- 1985 | New York City, United States

=== Collections ===
- AmBank Collection
- HSBC Bank Malaysia
- CitiBank Malaysia
- UK Government
- Sime Darby Plantation
- Golden Hope plantations
