= Cheng Haw-Chien =

Malaysian painter

Cheng Haw-Chien 鄭浩千
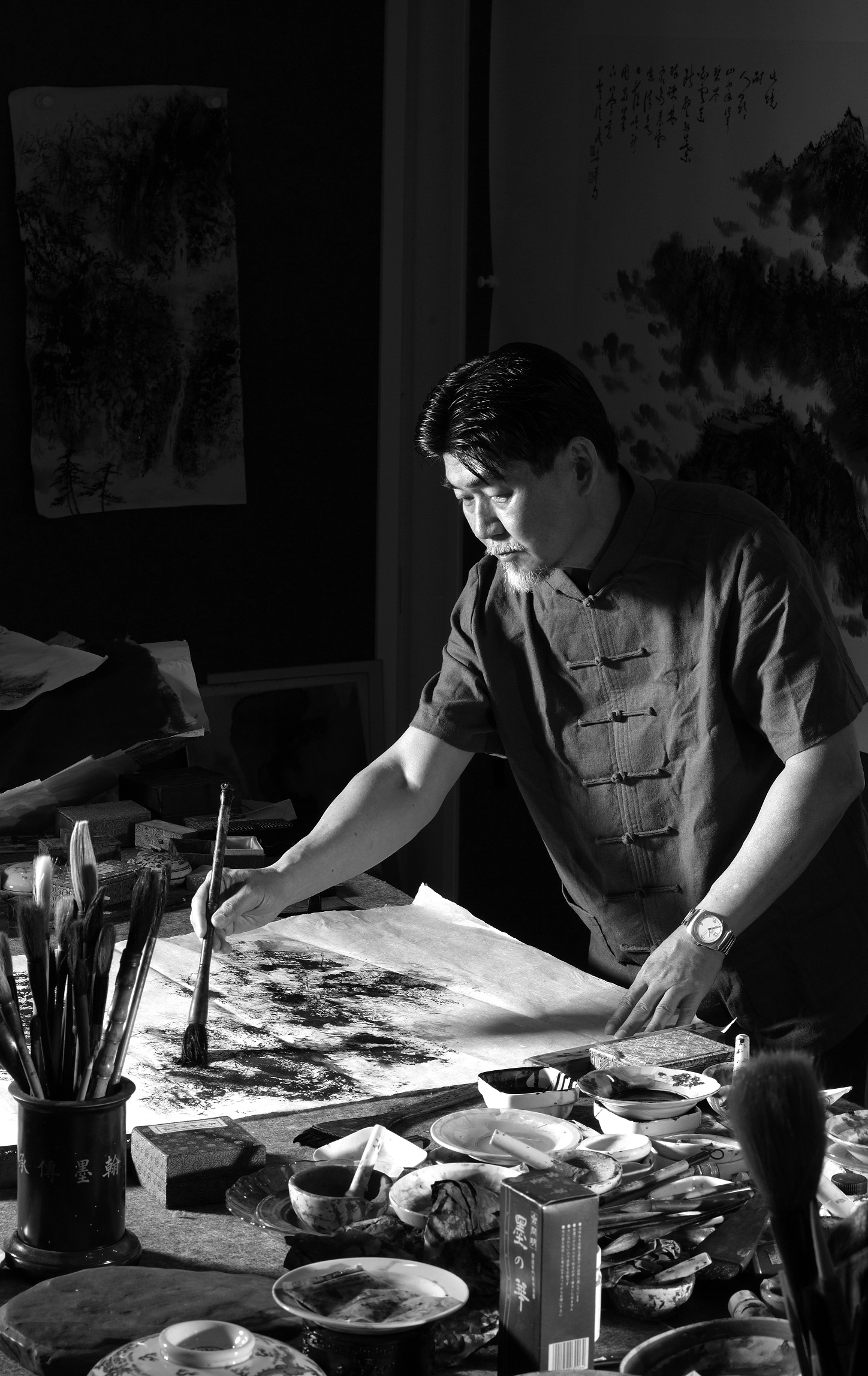
- Born: May 4, 1948 (age 78); Penang, Malaysia
- Known for: Painting / Poetry / Calligraphy / Philosophy
- Movement: Chinese Art Painting (Lingnan School)
- Website: www.chenghawchien.com

Cheng Haw-Chien

Chinese name
- Traditional Chinese: 鄭浩千
- Jyutping: Zeng6 Hou6 Cin1
- Hokkien POJ: Tēⁿ Hō-chhian
- Tâi-lô: Tēnn Hō-tshian

Cheng Haw-Chien (born May 4, 1948) is a Malaysian artist. He was born in 1948 in Penang, Malaysia. He studied the Lingnan style of painting, which fuses elements of Western and Japanese realism with Chinese ink painting on rice paper. He learned Chinese brush painting and western art forms when he was an adolescent. His interest was furthered when he continued his academic studies in Taiwan and Hong Kong after he graduated from secondary school. Thereon, he sought to refine his artistic skills under the guidance of many masters. He is the former principal of the Central Academy of Art and President of Central Research Academy of Art from 1983 to 1995. He is currently a visiting professor of Renmin University of China, Ningbo University, Changshu University of Technology, and Handan College, and a life-long consultant of Ningbo Art Museum.

He studied under Chao Shao-an (趙少昂) and visited Rao Zongyi (饒宗頤) in Hong Kong respectively. He also called on Zhang Daqian (張大千), Lang Ching-san (郎靜山), Liang Shih-Chiu (梁實秋), Tai Jing-Nong (邰靜農), Su Xuelin (蘇雪林) and Yu Kuang-chong (余光中) in Taiwan. Subsequently, he visited more celebrities in China, and had the presence of numerous revered figures in the cultural scene at the opening ceremony of his exhibition in China.

Cheng Haw-Chien also studied poetry, calligraphy and painting under Ven. Zhu Mo (竺摩长老) and Liu Taixi (劉太希). He claims to have a master's degree in the history of fine art from Summit University, Louisiana (a diploma mill) and doctorate degree from St. George University, Cambridge, for his achievement in research. He has won high accolades from artists and scholars in and outside of China.

He has chosen to work with two of the three traditional subject categories of Chinese painting landscape and bird and flowers. The formats which he uses are also traditional and include fans, albums, hanging scrolls, and scrolls which are cross between handscrolls and album-extended horizontal compositions meant to be viewed all at once. His exhibits have been exhibited in Asia, America, and Europe.

Cheng Haw-Chien is equipped with the Lingnan School (嶺南畫派) as well as Western painting techniques. His characteristic of using ink and colour enables him to bring out the features typical of his region. His paintings also reflect a poetic ambience, embodying the philosophy of the Lingnan School in 'learning from nature and being endowed by spiritual inspiration'.

After his graduation from the university in 1974, he toured South East Asia and European countries, holding solo exhibitions which were received positively, especially on his masterpieces such as Bridge Over the River Kwai and Tour to the Kingdom of Buddha. His other exhibitions in Malaysia and Europe, The Exhibition on Europe Tour series featuring Scene of Cambridge and Winter in Paris also received similar positive reviews. He has held 150 exhibitions in United States of America, Europe, Asia, Africa, Australia and the Pacific Island of West Indies.

== Chronology ==
- 1948 – Prof. Dr. Cheng Haw-Chien was born in Penang.
- 1968 – His oil painting entitled 'At Dawn' was selected in 'Local Artist Exhibition' organized by Penang Art Museum Gallery.
- 1969 – Held his first solo art exhibition in Penang.
- 1974 – He was graduated from National Chengchi University, Taiwan and held his solo art exhibition at Provincial Museum of Taiwan.
- 1976 – Held a solo art exhibition at the International Art Centre, London.
- 1978 – Became an art coordinator in a secondary school.
- 1981 – Prof. Dr. Cheng Haw-Chien embarked on a world tour covering Australia, New Zealand, the Pacific island nations, central and Southern America, the United States, Canada, Europe, Africa, India, Nepal, Myanmar, Laos, Thailand, the Philippines and many other countries. He photographed and sketched the myriad landscape and scenery of these countries and exhibited in over 150 solo exhibitions. His travel experience and study tours also resulted in producing articles on travel and art review columns in many local newspapers.
- 1982 – Held two solo art exhibitions in the same year at National Art Gallery, Trinidad and Cultural Centre, Jakarta.
- 1984 – Appointed as the principal of Central Academy of Art, Kuala Lumpur. Meanwhile, he also participated in many other art sectors and appointed as an art appraisal committee member of the National Art Gallery, Malaysia.
- 1985 – Led as a chairman of Malaysian artist delegation to participate in a Group exhibition at National Art Gallery, Museum of History, Taiwan. He also held solo art exhibition at Singapore High Commission, Kuala Lumpur.
- 1989 – Held solo art exhibition at The State Museum, Penang and Maybank Gallery, Kuala Lumpur.
- 1990 – Participated in Asian Calligraphy Exhibition at The Palace Museum, Beijing.
- 1994 – Held a solo exhibition at the National Art Museum of China in Beijing which were jointly invited by the eight major organizations, for instance, China International Cultural Association, Chinese Artists Association, Academy of Traditional Chinese Painting, Beijing Painting Institute, Xu Beihong Memorial Hall, etc. He was also appointed as the Vice Chairman of the International Calligraphy Association; Chairman of International Calligraphy Association, Malaysia; Chairman of the Malaysian Painting Calligraphy Association; Chairman of International Chinese Brush Painting Seminar & Exhibition in Kuala Lumpur.
- 1995 – Appointed as the Director of Metropolitan Gallery of Fine Arts, Kuala Lumpur and was subsequently invited to hold a solo exhibition at Liaoning Provincial Museum, China, followed by an invitation to Luxun Academy of Fine Arts to conduct a seminar.
- 1996 – Invited by the China Artist Association, he led Malaysian artist delegation to Beijing, Shanghai, Hangzhou, Nanjing and they held ‘Malaysian Art Exhibition’ at the National Art Museum of China in Beijing.
- 1997 – Being appointed as the president of Central Research Academy of Art, Kuala Lumpur. Summit University, United States of America conferred Master of Fine Arts to Prof. Dr. Cheng Haw-Chien.
- 1999 – Conferred Ph.D. from St. George University, Oxford. Awarded with Medal of Arts by The Chinese Writer's & Artist's Association in Taiwan.
- 2000 – Being appointed as visiting professor of Ren Ming University of China in Beijing.
- 2006 to 2009 – Prof. Dr. Cheng Haw-Chien again embarked on his world tour and held numerous solo art exhibitions at Penang State Gallery, YinXue Museum, Hangzhou, Changshu Art Museum, Fujian Art Museum, KaiPing Art Museum, Ning Bo Art Museum, Zhengzhou Art Museum, Inner Mongolia Art Museum, NanChang Art Museum, GuYuan Art Museum, ZhuHai, WuHan Art Museum (China).
- 2010 to 2016 – Appointed as visiting professor of ChangShu Technical University and also as the Advisor to Ningbo Art Museum.

He also held Solo Art Exhibition in National Art Gallery, Kuala Lumpur 'The Art World of Cheng Haw Chien' published by National Art Gallery, Kuala Lumpur. He also held several Solo Art Exhibition in China at XiaMen Art Museum, GuiYang Art Museum, Qingdao Art Museum, HeFei Art Museum, Ürümqi Art Museum, Xinjiang, Linnan Art Museum, Dongguan and Huizhou Museum.

== Positions ==
- 1983–1995: president, Central Academy of Art, Malaysia
- Since 1998: president, Central Research Academy of Art, Malaysia
- Since 2000: visiting professor of Renmin University of China in Beijing
- Since 2008: special term professor, College of Arts, Changshu Institute of Technology, China
- Since 2010: lifelong artistic advisor, Ningbo Museum of Art, Zhejiang, China

== Publications ==
- 2003: Poems of Cheng Haw Chien
- 2010: The Art World of Cheng Haw Chien
- Other: The Paintings of Cheng Haw Chien (vol. 1–5)
