= Rejabhad =

Malaysian cartoonist

Rejabhad, or Rejab bin Had, (23 August 1939 - 14 November 2002), was a Malaysian cartoonist, whose career started in the 1950s.

== History ==
His hometown was in Permatang Pauh, Penang. Rejabhad knew famous Malaysian cartoonist, Rashidin, who taught him about drawing comics. He joined the Malaysian Army after he left school three months after his debut comic was published in Gelanggang Filem magazine. He was dubbed as Raja Kartun Malaysia (King of Malaysian Cartoon).

He became a full-time cartoonist for Gila-Gila magazine published by Creative Enterprise after he retired from the armed services. He mentored for Malaysian cartoonists from the 1950s to 2000. His was known as Pak Jab by his fans.

Rejabhad died on the 14 November 2002, at the age of 63. His collections of magazines and articles are kept in his gallery in Universiti Sains Malaysia, Penang.

== Graphical novels ==
- Periwira Mat Gila (3 volumes)
  cover to Periwira Mat Gila
- Tan Tin Tun
- Mawar Oh Mawar
- Selendang Siti Rogayah
- GG Dengan Rejabhad
- Prebet Dabus
- Senyum Sedikit (2 volumes)
- Pisang Emas Jalak Lenteng
- Amal (son of Periwira Mat Gila) (last novel)

== See also ==
- Malaysian comics
- Gila-Gila
