= Ahmad Fuad Osman =

Malaysian contemporary artist and painter

- Born: 1969 (age 56–57)
- Known for: Installation art, painting, social and cultural commentary
- Style: Contemporary art

Ahmad Fuad Osman (born 1969) also known as Fuad, is a contemporary artist and painter in Malaysia known for installation art inspired by social and cultural changes. He is one of the founding members of the artist collective Matahati, formed in 1991, which played a role in the development of Malaysian contemporary art. He currently works and resides in Kuala Lumpur.

In 1998, Fuad joined protests around the firing of Anwar Ibrahim. The National Art Gallery in Kuala Lumpur organized a mid-career survey of his work in 2019–20. All artwork in this survey was approved by the museum, but on January 31 four artworks were removed allegedly due to being politically obscene.

== Awards ==
- 1994: Honourable Mention, Malaysian Art Open, Petronas Gallery, Kuala Lumpur, Malaysia
- 1994: Honourable Mention, Philip Morris Malaysia Art Award, National Art Gallery, Malaysia
- 2000: Jurors Choice, Philip Morris Malaysia Art Award, National Art Gallery, Malaysia
- 2003: Jurors Choice, Philip Morris Malaysia Art Award, National Art Gallery, Malaysia
- 2004: Asian Artists Fellowship, Freeman Foundation, Vermont Studio Centre, United States
- 2005/2006: Asian Artists Fellowship, Goyang National Art Studio, South Korea
- 2008: Jurors Choice, APBF Art Awards 2008, Singapore Art Museum, Singapore
