= Yeoh Kean Thai =

Malaysian artist (born 1966)

Yeoh Kean Thai (born 1966) is a Malaysian artist.

== Achievements ==
Yeoh Kean Thai is a former winner of the Philip Morris Art Award, Freeman Fellowship (Vermont Studio) and most recently the prestigious Commonwealth Arts Award.

He has developed a unique aesthetic language using metal and metal aesthetic. His is credited with being one of the first artists from Malaysia to be featured during New York's "Asia Art Week", in March 2008 and then again in 2009, through Shalini Ganendra Fine Art. He has exhibited in other international venues including Hong Kong and Italy.

His works are in the permanent collection of the National Art Gallery, Malaysia and numerous corporate and individual collections.

== Themes ==
The underlying themes of Thai’s works, since the early 1990s, involved the processes through which the natural environment is disrupted, corrupted and manipulated by human development and urbanisation. Thai’s use of technique, colour and perspective are meant to invite individual empathy and reaction.

These themes of environment, decay and visual regeneration continue–but have evolved into a visual palette that has been described as more engaging and unique.
