= Mishar (cartoonist) =

Malaysian cartoonist

Mishar, or Mior Shariman Hassan, was a Malaysian cartoonist whose career started in the 1960s. He worked as an illustrator and writer at the Institute of Language and Literature. Also, he worked with the Utusan Melayu newspaper.

== See also ==
- Gila-Gila
- Malaysian comics
