= Alex Ong =

Malaysian painter (born 1951)

Alex Ong Boon Hau
- Born: 1951; Muar, Johor, Federation of Malaya (now Malaysia)

Alex Ong Boon Hau (Chinese: 翁文豪; born 1951) is a Malaysian painter. Most of his paintings have naturalistic elements, and often depict plants from the wild, such as the yarrow.

== Career ==
Born 1951 in Muar, Johor, Malaysia, Ong attended the Kuala Lumpur College of Art and graduated in 1977. Since then, he has held at least seven solo exhibitions, the first of which being in 1994. Ong has received two awards from the Malaysian Watercolour Society, one in 1987 and another in 1990, in recognition of his watercolour rock paintings. Ong's works have been cited as being able to "conjure up a romantic expression of life and love", such as the paintings in his 2008 exhibition titled Romance. His third solo exhibition, Seasons 2, which was held in 2002, as a follow-up to 1999's Seasons, reportedly took three years to complete. A member of the Singapore Watercolour Society, he visits New Zealand at least once every year to seek inspiration for his paintings.
