= Handan University =

Provincial public college in Handan, Hebei, China

- 邯郸学院
- Type: Public college
- Established: 1905
- Location: Handan, Hebei, China
- Website: hdc.edu.cn

Handan University
- Simplified Chinese: 邯郸学院
- Traditional Chinese: 邯鄲學院
- Literal meaning: Handan College
Transcriptions
Standard Mandarin
- Hanyu Pinyin: Hándān Xuéyuàn

Handan University (Chinese: 邯郸学院; lit. 'Handan College'), formerly Handan College, is a provincial public college in Handan, Hebei, China. The college is affiliated with the Province of Hebei. Previously holding vocational technical college status, the institution was granted college status in 2004. Despite its English name, the institution has not been granted university status.

== History ==
Handan University, established in December 1905, has been operating in the higher education field for over 60 years. The college has endured several historical periods, from the end of the Qing dynasty to the foundation of the People's Republic of China. Thus, the education policies of each period have imprinted their influences on its development from a primary normal school of Handan County to a junior senior normal school and to a university of Handan City.

== Campus ==
Handan University has developed into a comprehensive university, with a total area of 413,846 square meters, among which the teaching building covers 173,894 square meters, and students' accommodation of 55,867 square meters.

== Library ==
The library is equipped with 595,000 books and a digital library.

In the last 60 years, 30,000 students have graduated from Handan University. The university has around 10,000 full-time students.
