= Chang Fee Ming =

Malaysian artist

- Born: 1959 (age 66–67); Dungun, Terengganu, Federation of Malaya
- Citizenship: Malaysian

Chang Fee Ming (simplified Chinese: 郑辉明; traditional Chinese: 鄭輝明; pinyin: Zhèng Huīmíng; Jyutping: Zeng6 Fai1 Ming4; Pe̍h-ōe-jī: Tēⁿ Hui-bêng, born 1959) is a Malaysian artist who works in watercolour, painting idyllic rural scenes. Chang is one of the most successful and highly regarded contemporary watercolourists in Southeast Asia. A self-taught artist, he began his career in the early 1980s.

He started his international travels in the early 1980s — to Nepal, India, Indochina.

He is currently in Singapore (May 2016) to hold an exhibition called "A Traveller's Diary".

== Book ==
- The World Of Chang Fee Ming (1995)
- The Visible Trail of Chang Fee Ming (2000)
- Mekong (2004)
- Mekong Exploring the Source (2008)
- Imprinted Thoughts (2009)
- Sketching Through Southeast Asia (2010)
- Visage (2010)
