= Kadokawa Gempak Starz =

Comic company in Malaysia

Kadokawa Gempak Starz 角川平方
- Logo of Gempak Starz
- Parent company: Kadokawa Corporation
- Status: Active
- Founded: 1998
- Country of origin: Malaysia
- Headquarters location: Kuala Lumpur
- Publication types: Graphic novels, novels, magazines, manga, light novels
- Owner: Kadokawa Holdings Asia Ltd. (80%)
- Official website: gempakstarz.com

Kadokawa Gempak Starz (Chinese: 角川平方; pinyin: Jiǎochuān píngfāng; lit. 'Kadokawa Square') (trading as Gempak Starz, formerly Malaysian Art Square Group (Chinese: 平方集团; pinyin: Píngfāng jítuán; lit. 'Square Group')) is a Malaysian graphic novel, comics and manga publisher owned by Kadokawa Corporation. Originally established as Komik Lawak Atau Lawak Creation in 1971, the company previously produced Gempak, a magazine dedicated to showcasing local comic artists from Malaysia to wider audiences. Gempak has the distinction of being the first Malaysian info-comic magazine, offering news and articles about the ACG (Animation, Comics & Games) world in and outside of the country. Gempak magazine aims to encourage the local development of such industries, facilitating the global spread of Malaysian talent.

== History ==
Gempak debuted on 1 June 1998, at a time when Malaysia was attempting to recover from the 1997 economic crisis. The economic crisis brought a hard impact on the Malaysian comic industry.

To gain a place in the Malaysian comic market, Art Square Creation incorporated the "info-comic" approach, which became the main formula of Gempak's success, and the new standard format for many Malaysian comics. It took 18 months for their success to take off without any help from other media advertisements. Starting as a monthly issue for the first three years, it has come to be published bi-monthly (since June 2001), with many demands that the magazine should go for weekly issue.

Their concept of an info-comic magazine has become a trend followed by many recent comic magazines, including one of Malaysia's biggest publishers, Karangkraf Sdn. Bhd., who began releasing a new info-comic magazine titled Jom (later ceased publication). The success of Gempak also resulted in the success of its publisher, Art Square Creation Sdn. Bhd., who expanded to become Art Square Group with three subsidiaries: Art Square Creation Sdn. Bhd, Anjung Taipan Sdn. Bhd., and Gala Unggul Sdn. Bhd. All Art Square Group products are now labelled under their own brand "GEMPAK STARZ."

Gempak, under Art Square Creation, won the Persatuan Penerbit-Penerbit Majalah Malaysia (MPA) award under other category special Malay magazine ("majalah pengkhususan" (Bahasa Malaysia)) 2007.

In December 2015, Kadokawa Corporation through its Hong Kong subsidiary Kadokawa Holdings Asia Ltd (KHA), acquired an 80% stake in Malaysian Art Square Group (MSG).

=== Kadokawa Gempak Starz era ===
Following Kadokawa Corporation's acquisition, MSG was renamed to Kadokawa Gempak Starz in January 2016.

== Subsidiaries ==
- SPARKS: An online store.
- Gempak Starz store: An online store.
- KADOKAWA GEMPAK STARZ SDN BHD: Malaysia division.
- KADOKAWA GEMPAK STARZ (S) PTE LTD: Singapore division.

== Gempak Starz products ==
Besides magazines, Art Square Group publishes more than 200 products under the brand of GEMPAK STARZ. The products include graphic novels (including acquired foreign comics), T-shirts, caps, mugs, toys, posters, illustration books, stationery, and collection items.

=== Publishing labels ===
- Gempak Starz:
- Learn More (Chinese: 浩学堂; pinyin: Hào xué táng; lit. 'Great/Grand School'): Educational comic series.
- Magic Bean (Chinese: 魔豆; pinyin: Mó dòu): Pop literature series.
- Gempack 360°/CK 360°/Learn More 360°: Publisher's YouTube channels, features various comics and ACG-related content, including artist interviews and more.

=== Komik Seram ===
Komik Seram (lit. 'Horror Comic') is the name for their horror comics. They are most popular and best-selling in the company, although, minimum comics are sometimes sold out because of popularity.

Below is the list of horror comics sold by Gempak:

- Dari Alam Angker (by various artists)

- Warisan Puaka by Nizam Bachok
- Seringai Malam by Nizam Bachok
- Dajal Berbisik by KF
- Lawang Penamat by Maita Nao

== List of Gempak comics Cartoonist ==
- Keith
1. Lawak Kampus
2. Lawak Kampus Connection
3. Lawak Kampus Friends Edition
4. Lawak Kampus League
5. Lawak Kampus Move On
6. Lawak Kampus Rebound
7. Encore! Lawak Kampus Artbook
8. Kuso High School
9. Kuso High School Log In
10. Kuso High School Teamwork
11. Wasabi
- Zint
1. 2 Dudes For Life
2. Bodyguard.com
3. Boy's Scout
4. GoGo ChaCha Street
5. Hero
6. K.O King Conquest
7. Cheap Shot
8. Eli
9. Rapsodi 18
10. Zenith 4
11. Boy’s Scout
12. Kaleidoscope Collection 01: Our Blue Sky
13. Kaleidoscope Collection 03: The Journey
14. Kaleidoscope Collection 04: Great Day
15. Kaleidoscope Collection 05: Woo Hoo!
16. Kisah Pengembaraan Kroit
17. Kijiya 1 - 15
18. Lawak Under 18
19. MFEO (Meant For Each Other)
20. Raiden
21. Scarbot & Monky
22. Sharkman The Hitman
23. Si Penjual Aiskrim
24. Under 18 Elite 1 - 15
25. User
26. Xpresi Tempur
27. Under 18 Attitude 1 - 12
28. Speeder
29. Fistlogic
30. MISI GOG (Guardian Of Green)
31. Under 18 Spirit
- Kaoru
1. Kaoru's Cake House
2. 143 Kaoru's Cake House (Novel)
3. Daisuki
4. 143
5. Colours
6. Meet Cupid
7. After School With You
8. Candy Series
9. Cinta Untuk Dijual
10. Cuma Kucing Yang Tahu
11. Helios Eclipse oleh Kaoru
12. Lawak Valentine
13. LOVE DRAMA
14. Love For Sale
15. Love Triangle
16. Lost Diary
17. Maid Maiden – Monday
18. Maid Maiden – Wednesday
19. Maid Maiden – Friday
20. Maid Maiden – Saturday
21. Maid Maiden – Sunday
22. My Secret Bodyguard
23. My Secret Boyfriend
24. My Secret Buddy
25. Nonetheless, I love You
26. Only The Cats Know
27. Strawberry Vampire
28. Tell Me Your Name (New)
29. Voice of An Angel
- Ben
1. Fatal Chaos Turbo Ex
2. Fatal Chaos
3. Te@mare
4. Le Gardenie
5. Naive
6. The Fishes
7. Innocent
- Juice/Norman Noh
1. Juice
2. Caramel Theater
3. Primavera
- Slaium
1. Utopia High
2. Utopia High Revisited
3. Utopia High Revisited- Hunting High & Low
4. Lawak Utopia High Reunion
5. Drak
- Fakhrul Anour
1. Cinta Tunggal (Novel)
2. 143 Kaoru's Cake House (Novel)
3. Pentas Realiti: Aspirasi Seni (Novel)
4. Siri Maskeret Cinta: Hanya...
5. Hanya...Cinta
6. Mencintai Dia
- Tadatada / Lee Kok Chen
1. Good Morning Teacher!
2. Hello Mei Mei
3. Jejak Libasan Jaguh
4. Monster Girl
5. Paper Labyrinth
6. Selamat Pagi Cikgu!
7. The Prince and I
8. X-VENTURE: The Golden Age Of Adventure
- Daniyal Aiman
1. Komik Fatdream
2. Demam Cinta
- Oga
1. 5th Dimension
2. Brother X3
3. Brother X3 Presto
4. Crazy Family
5. Mamai
6. Oxer
7. Stories After Dark Don't Turn Off the Light Korea (New)
8. Taiko and Little Peach
9. X-VENTURE: Titanoboa
10. X-VENTURE: Ancaman Boa Purba
11. X-VENTURE: Titanoboa Coils of Doom
12. X-VENTURE Extreme Xploration: Perilous Peak
13. X-VENTURE Extreme Xploration: Kembara Puncak Maut
14. X-VENTURE Extreme Xploration: Drifting Dead
15. X-VENTURE Extreme Xploration: Kebangkitan Mayat Hidup
16. X-VENTURE Extreme Xploration: Skyfallen Safari
17. X-VENTURE Extreme Xploration: Kerajaan Langit
18. X-VENTURE Extreme Xploration: Ferogious Fauna
19. X-VENTURE Extreme Xploration: Jerat Berbisa Flora
20. X-VENTURE Extreme Xploration: Meteoroid Mayhem
21. X-VENTURE Extreme Xploration: Zombie Meteorit
22. X-VENTURE Extreme Xploration: Mammoth Monstrosity
23. X-VENTURE Extreme Xploration: Ledakan Epidemik
24. X-VENTURE Extreme Xploration: Robot Rebellion
25. X-VENTURE Extreme Xploration: Kebangkitan Robotik
26. X-VENTURE Extreme Xploration: Robot Retaliation
27. X-VENTURE Extreme Xploration: Tentangan Robot
28. X-VENTURE Extreme Xploration: Nuclear Nemesis
29. X-VENTURE Extreme Xploration: Angkara Misil
30. X-VENTURE Extreme Xploration: Graveyard Gorge
31. X-VENTURE Extreme Xploration: Azure Abyss
- Jo
1. Showtime!
2. Donkey High School
3. Chicky & Chucky Mercury
- Bob
1. Faces
- Xanseviera
1. Lawak Fairy Godbrother
2. Snap!
3. Next Station
4. Love Boat
5. Love Track
6. Love Band
7. Love Terminal
8. Neko Online.com
- Michael Chuah / C2V
1. 3 Hour to Master: How To Build Memory and Focus
2. 3 Hour to Master: How To Control Your Finances
3. 3 Hour to Master: How To Expand Your Creativity
4. 3 Hour to Master: How To Get Perfect Marks
5. 3 Hour to Master: How To Manage Your Mood
6. 3 Hour to Master: How To Maintain Good Friendships
7. 3 Hour to Master: How To Reduce Stress
8. 3 Hour to Master: How To Strengthen Self-Discipline
9. 3 Hour to Master: How To Stay Healthy
10. 3 Hour to Master: How To Surf Safely
11. Gengkey
12. Gengkey (Remake)
13. Lawak OK-KO
14. X-VENTURE: Kappa
15. X-VENTURE: Misi Menyelamat Kappa
16. X-VENTURE: Kappa Chaos
17. Monster Chaos
- Kenny Chua
1. Jinggo Concluded
2. Jinggo Replay
3. Pop! Bang! Boom!
- Other
1. Glock 17 oleh Ageha
2. Mat Gempak (Remake) oleh Apoh
3. Mat Gempak oleh Apoh and Botak
4. Kishiro Budak Sihir oleh Bear
5. Shadow Quest oleh Clay
6. Falcon oleh Clay
7. Jangka Attribut oleh Clay
8. Jejak Neraka oleh Cicak
9. Zaman Gemilang oleh Hang Sembilan
10. 5 Elemen oleh Kash
11. Dunia Cahaya oleh Kash
12. Gol Kraziee 2000 oleh Kash
13. Red Fox oleh King Kong
14. Dewi Remaja (Manhwa) oleh Lee Ju
15. IT Ekspress oleh Neko (komik pengiklanan)
16. Go Notty oleh Nizam Bachok
17. Velocity oleh Puppeteer
18. Evolusi Identiti oleh Puppeteer
19. Jinggo (Remake) oleh Puppeteer
20. Twisted Mind of Puyuh oleh Puyuh@Leong Wan Kok
21. Student King oleh Stanley G
22. Hotlink Warrior oleh Slaium (komik pengiklanan)
23. Jackie Perang Pit oleh Taufan
24. Fear Factor oleh Taufan
25. Pahlawan Raja Alam oleh Taufan
26. Experiment 105 oleh Totoro
27. Detektif Hantu oleh Totoro
28. Detektif Hantu (Remake) oleh Totoro
29. G.R.A.V.E. oleh Totoro
30. Journey to the West/Raja Monyet oleh Totoro
31. Pelayan Rahasia
32. Segi TiGA Rahsia
33. Siri Maskaret Cinta oleh kartunis berbeza (bahagian kekal)
34. Dari Alam Angker/Komik Angker oleh kartunis berbeza (bahagian kekal)
35. Komik Eksklusif oleh kartunis berbeza (bahagian kekal)
36. X-Pax Channel Comic oleh kartunis berbeza (komik pengiklanan)
37. Komik Antarabangsa oleh artis antarabangsa (Usang)
38. Zoology oleh Stanley G, Neko, Jo, and Keith
39. Taufan Pesaka, bahagian 1, 2, dan 3 oleh Hang Sembilan (parts 1, 2) and Kash (part 3)

== See also ==
- List of magazines in Malaysia
- Malaysian comics
