= Ibrahim Mohammed Khalil =

- Citizenship: Iraq
- Known for: Sentenced to seven years in prison for being a member in a terrorist organisation

Ibrahim Mohammed Khalil is a suspected al Qaida facilitator who was arrested in Germany in January 2005, on an allegation that he had played a role in al Qaida's recruiting efforts in Europe and accusations he tried to buy black market uranium.

Khalil is alleged to have trained in Afghan military camps. He is alleged to have fought in Afghanistan after September 11, 2001, and he is alleged to have "had contact with" Osama bin Laden.

In December 2007, he was sentenced to seven years in prison for being a member in a foreign terrorist organisation in connection with fraud after a controversial 131-day-long trial before a court in the German city Düsseldorf.
