= Cheah Thien Soong =

Malaysian artist

- Traditional Chinese: 謝忝宋
- Simplified Chinese: 谢忝宋
Transcriptions
Standard Mandarin
- Hanyu Pinyin: Xiè Tiǎnsòng

== Early life and education ==
Dr. Cheah Thien Soong (born 1942, Negeri Sembilan, Malaya) is a contemporary ink-painting artist in Malaysia. Cheah is considered the second generation of Nanyang-style contemporary ink-painting artist. He graduated from Chung Hua High School in Seremban, Malaysia in 1959 before proceeding to Singapore's Nanyang Academy of Fine Arts. There, he studied both Chinese and Western painting under the tutelage of artists such as Chen Wen Xi, Choong Soo Peng, Chen Zhong Rui, Shi Xiang Tuo, and Georgette Chen. He held his first exhibitions in 1962, and has since won a number of awards from art institutes in Malaysia, Singapore, and Taiwan. His paintings often include trees. From 1990 to 2002, he served as a lecturer at the Malaysian Institute of Art in Kuala Lumpur; he also returned to his hometown to found the Seremban Institute of Art. He received his doctorate from the Interamerican University of Puerto Rico in 2002. As a result of a trip he took to Jiangxi in 2003, he has branched out from canvas and taken up the challenge of painting on porcelain, creating works with Malaysian subjects painted onto Jingdezhen clay.

== Family ==
Cheah has two younger brothers, who both live in Guangxi, China; since 1991, he has gone to Guangxi every two or three years to visit them.
