= Kopi Soh =

Kopi Soh is the pseudonym of a Malaysian author and illustrator best known for her book Oh, I Thought I Was The Only One. She founded the Facebook community "Stick It To Me," a page centered around producing "healing art" for the sick and needy, and organizes a group of volunteers to produce art for hospitals and charities. Her work with "Stick It To Me" was recognized in the Digi WWWOW Awards 2015, winning an award in the Social Gathering category. She also served as the official illustrator for TEDxWeldQuay 2013 and has worked with various nonprofit organizations such as AsPaCC Community Hospice, Pusat Perubatan Universiti Malaya (PPUM), Pusat Perubatan Universiti Kebangsaan Malaysia (PPUKM), Bukit Harapan Orphanage, and Cambodia Water Project.

In 2017, Stick It To Me contributed healing art to charity efforts assisting hundreds of families living at the Sandakan landfill in Sabah, Malaysia. During the Hari Raya season, Stick It To Me helped provide food and art to needy families in Bahau, Negri Sembilan.

== Writings ==
Kopi Soh's first book, Oh, I Thought I Was The Only One, published by Dawning Victory Consultancy in 2012, is a self-help book oriented towards creating awareness of common psychological issues which manifest in daily life. In 2013, Kopi Soh published her second book, Oh... I Thought I Was the Only One 2, a sequel focusing on how children experience various stresses.

In 2019, her original manuscript Looking After the Ashes was accepted for publication by Penguin Random House SEA, and the novel was released in 2021.
