= Khalil Ibrahim (artist) =

Malaysian artist (1934–2018)

Khalil Ibrahim (1934 – 15 May 2018) was a Malaysian artist. He is known for his drawing, watercolour, and acrylic. His style ranges from realist to abstract.

Ibrahim's artistic career spanned over 50 years. He has exhibited his work in Malaysia, Indonesia, Singapore, and Switzerland, and participated in group exhibitions in many other countries.

Ibrahim earned a National Design Diploma, and later attended the Central Saint Martins College of Art and Design in London, England. He was Vice Chairman of Malaysian Watercolour Organisation from 2002 to 2003.
