= Mohamed Zain Idris =

- Born: 1939; Terengganu, Malaysia
- Died: 2000 (aged 60–61)
- Known for: watercolor, oil.

== Biography ==
Mohamed Zain Idris, commonly known as M. Zain (1939–2000) was born in Terengganu, Malaysia. He was a self-taught painter known for his work in watercolor and oil.

Kampung, 1997, watercolor

M. Zain painted primarily in watercolor and oil. His subjects often depicted bucolic rural landscapes and the people who lived and worked among them. Boats and fishing were a central theme in his work and he earned the nickname 'The Fisherman Artist' from a poem titled 'Fisherman Art-ist' by the American art critic and gallerist Frank Sullivan. He was appointed the rare title of 'State Artist' by the Terengganu Menteri Besar and was given his own studio and residence including a stipend.

His works are in the collections of the Royal Families of Terengganu and Johar, the MB of Terengganu, Tan Sri Haji Wan Moktar Ahmad, Puan Sri Kuok and Standard Chartered Bank.

=== Exhibitions ===
- 1971 | Samat Art Gallery, Kuala Lumpur, Malaysia
- 1972 | Samat Art Gallery, Kuala Lumpur, Malaysia
- 1987 | Hotel Equatorial, Kuala Lumpur, Malaysia
- 1987 | Hotel Shangri-la, Kuala Lumpur, Malaysia
