= Chuah Thean Teng =

Malaysian artist

- Born: Cai Tianding; 1914; Fujian, China
- Died: 25 November 2008 (aged 96); Penang, Malaysia
- Known for: Painting

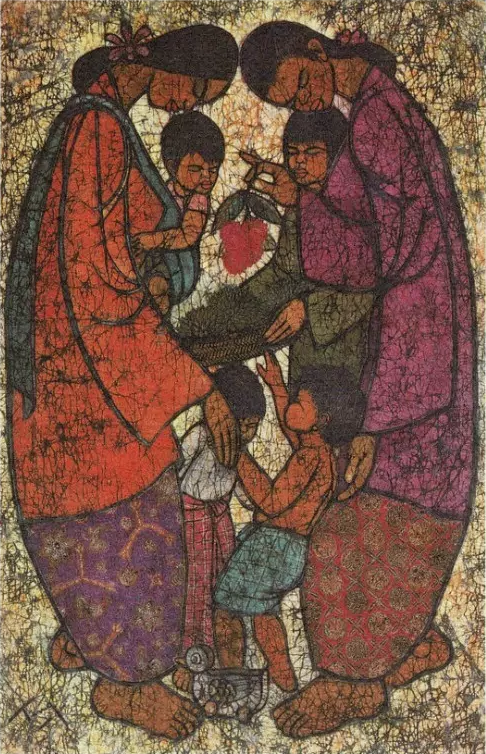
Chuah Thean Teng, Musim Buah (1968)Collection of Balai Seni Visual Negara

Dato' Chuah Thean Teng (Chinese: 蔡天定; pinyin: Cài Tiāndìng; Jyutping: Coi3 Tin1 Ding6; Pe̍h-ōe-jī: Chhòa Thian-tēng; 1914 – 25 November 2008), also known as Cai Tianding, was a Malaysian artist who is credited with the development of batik as a painting technique.

== Early life and education ==
Chuah Thean Teng was born in 1914 in Fujian, China; Chuah's father traded sundries while his mother made shoes for women with bound feet. The family emigrated to Penang, Malaysia when Chuah was 14; Chuah returned to Fujian to pursue an education at the Amoy Art School (later the Xiamen Academy of Fine Arts), but returned to Malaya (now Malaysia) at the age of 17. He subsequently experimented with various art media, including oils and woodblock printing on his own under the pseudonym Choo Ting, while working part-time as an art teacher.

== Early experiments in art ==
Following World War II, Chuah opened a batik factory in Penang. While the venture quickly proved to be a failure, Chuah began experimenting with batik as an art form. According to T.K. Sabapathy, Chuah produced his first batik medium work entitled Malayan Life in 1941.

In his 1963 article in The Sunday Mail, "Teng - Master of Batik", Frank Sullivan said of his work "It is astonishing to think that although making batik has been common for hundreds of years, no one before Teng ever thought of adapting this age-old craft as a medium of fine art." He went on to say "Teng and Teng alone, is responsible for this most original contribution to the whole world of art. As an artist in this old and new medium, Teng is the unquestioned master."

Chuah was credited by art critics like Frank Sullivan for conceiving the idea of combining the traditional Malayan craft medium of batik and its techniques with the tradition of modern easel painting.

Some of the themes which appeared in Chuah's work on include the human figure, landscapes and abstract compositions. Of these, the human figure has been the most significant.

== Career ==
He held his first exhibition in 1955 at the Penang Library, curated by Patricia Lim, which was followed by the 1956 exhibition "An Exhibition of Batik Paintings and Other Works", organised by the Singapore Art Society and held at the British Council Gallery, Singapore. This seminal exhibition was credited with inaugurating Batik painting as a new art category.

He established the art and antique gallery Yahong Art Gallery in Penang in 1975. His artworks were featured on UNICEF greeting cards in 1967 and UNESCO greeting cards in 1989. He was the second Malaysian artist to be accorded a Retrospective Exhibition at the National Art Gallery (now Balai Seni Visual Negara) in 1965.

In 1968, Chuah's Yahong Gallery published "Batik", which included essays by Ungku Abdul Aziz, then Chairman of the National Art Gallery, and Frank Sullivan, as well as for the first time, essays by Chuah himself, on his philosophy and techniques.

In 1983, Chuah was included in the first national survey of modern Malaysian artists by T. K. Sabapathy and Redza Piyadasa, "Modern Artists of Malaysia", which was commissioned and published by Dewan Bahasa dan Pustaka.

== Final years ==
He was conferred the Darjah Setia Pangkuan Negeri (DSPN) by the Penang State Government in 1998, which carried the title of Dato'. Chuah was awarded the Penang Heritage Trust's Living Heritage Award in 2005. He remained active in his final years and died on 25 November 2008 aged 96. Chuah is survived by three sons, all of whom are also artists: Siew Teng (born 1944), Seow Keng (born 1945), and Siew Kek (born 1946).

== Legacy ==
Chuah Thean Teng is widely regarded as the "father of batik art" who developed batik as a means of painting; "his adaptation of the traditional batik medium into an accepted form of painting ... elevated the status of batik as a craft to an art medium."

Chuah has had the distinction of having works being in the foundational National collections of both Malaysia and Singapore. His 1952 work "Perairan Pulau Pinang" was one of a number of works given to the Malaysian Government to form the nucleus of the collection of the National Art Gallery in Kuala Lumpur. Similarly, a number of Chuah's works were gifted by Loke Wan Tho to the Singapore Government, which became Singapore's National Collection of visual art, currently under the care of the National Gallery, Singapore.

This has continued to the present day, as Chuah's self-portrait, which uses batik to depict a "very strong gaze showing his (Chuah's) sense of determination", was the first artwork to be registered in the National Collection of visual art when the National Gallery, Singapore was established.

In December 2022, a book "Exploring Southeast Asia with Chuah Thean Teng: Father of Batik Painting" illustrating Chuah's life and his contributions to Southeast Asian art was published.

== Solo exhibitions ==
- 1955, Arts Council of Penang and Province Wellesley, Penang Library
- 1956, British Council, Singapore
- 1957, Kuala Lumpur
- 1959, Commonwealth Institute, London
- 1963, Arts Council, British Council Centre, Kuala Lumpur
- 1964, Arts Council, British Council Centre, Kuala Lumpur
- 1964, Pomeroy Galleries, San Francisco, California, USA
- 1965, Commonwealth Institute, London
- 1965, Retrospective exhibition, National Art Gallery, Kuala Lumpur
- 1967, Stichting Twents-Gelders Textielmuseum, Enschede, Holland
- 1972, The Gallery, Palm Springs, California, USA
- 1977, Churchill Art Gallery, Perth, Australia
- 1994, Retrospective exhibition, Penang State Art Gallery, Penang
- 2008, Retrospective exhibition, Balai Seni Lukis Negara, Kuala Lumpur (now the Balai Seni Visual Negara)
