= Deng (Chinese surname) =

Dèng
- Romanization: Mandarin: Dèng (pinyin), Têng^{4} (Wade-Giles); Cantonese: Dahng (Yale), Dang6 (Jyutping); Minnan: Tēng (Pe̍h-ōe-jī); Vietnamese: Đặng; Korean: Deung)
- Language: Chinese

Origin
- Word/name: Nanyang, Henan ancestral hall (南陽堂)

Deng is an East Asian surname of Chinese origin which has many variant spellings and transliterations. Dèng is the pinyin transcription of 邓 (simplified) or 鄧 (traditional). In 2019, Deng was the 21st most common surname in mainland China.

== Variant spellings ==
It is transliterated as Dèng in pinyin and Têng^{4} in Wade-Giles. In Cantonese, it is Dahng in Yale and Dang6 in Jyutping. In Minnan, it is Tēng in Pe̍h-ōe-jī. The Sino-Vietnamese cognate is Đặng and it is one of the top ten surnames in Vietnam. The name is transliterated as Deung in Korean but is very rare in Korea. Deng is one of the surnames of the Nanyang, Henan ancestral hall (南陽堂). In addition to spelling "Deng" used in mainland China, other common Chinese spelling variations include:

- Tang – Romanization based on Cantonese spelling common in Hong Kong and Macao
- Teng – Romanization based on Wade-Giles transliteration of Mandarin Chinese common spelling in Taiwan
- Ong or Ang – based on the Taishanese pronunciation, as in the case of Betty Ong

== Notable people with the surname ==
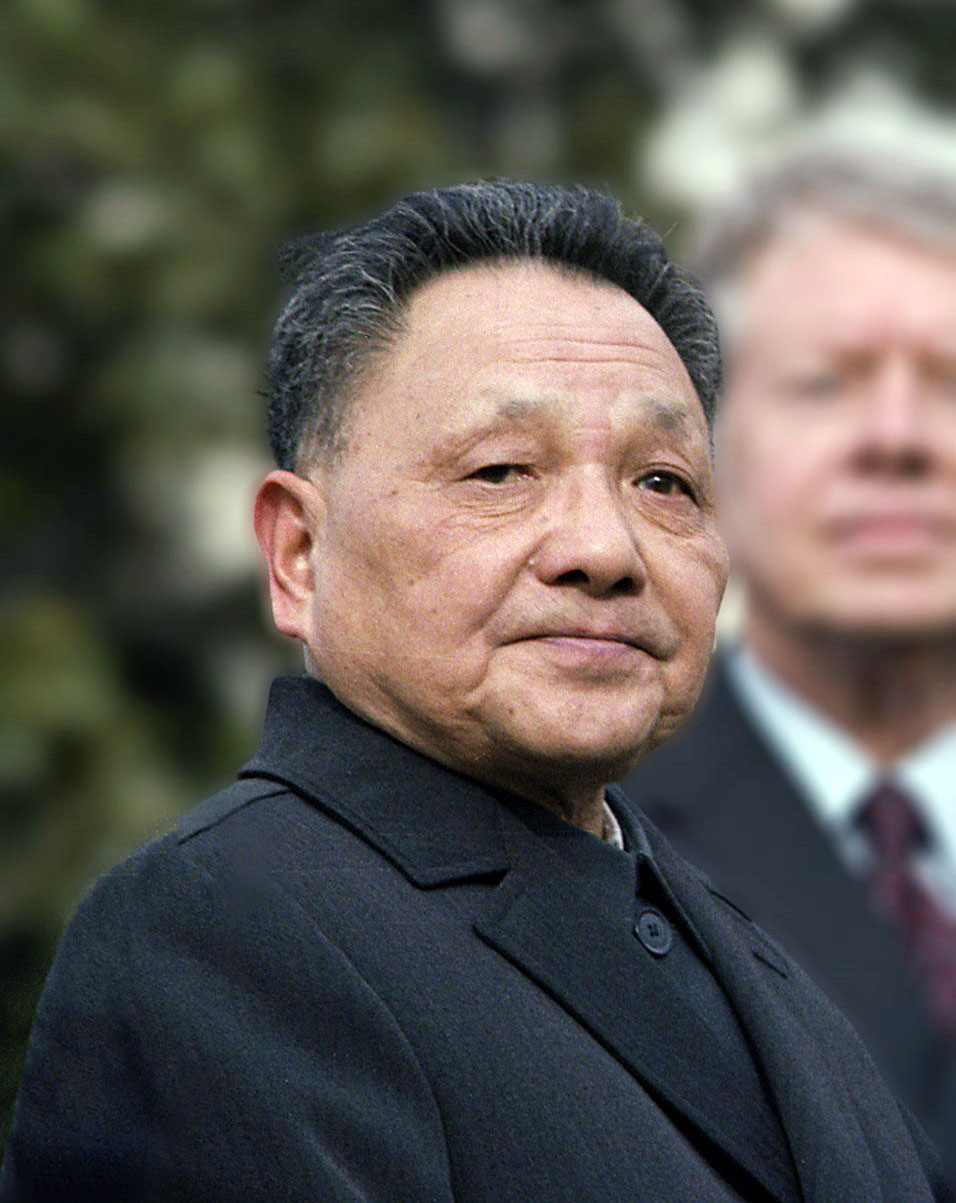
Deng Xiaoping

=== Deng ===
- Deng Ai, general of Cao Wei during the Three Kingdoms period
- Deng Changguo (鄧昌國), violinist and champion of musical education
- Deng Chao, contemporary Chinese actor
- Deng Cuiying (鄧萃英), first president of Xiamen University and educational reformer
- Deng Jiaxian, nuclear physicist and recipient of the Two Bombs, One Satellite Meritorious Award
- Deng Liqun, leading figure of the Chinese Communist Party in the 1980s
- Deng Longguang (鄧龍光), Chinese general in World War II
- Deng Lun (邓伦), Chinese film and television actor, model and singer
- Deng Maoqi (鄧茂七), leader of a tenant rebellion in Fujian at the end of the 1440s
- Deng Ming-Dao, Taoist author
- Deng Qingming, People's Liberation Army Astronaut Corps taikonaut who flew on Shenzhou 15
- Deng Shichang, Qing Dynasty admiral
- Deng Shiru (鄧石如), calligrapher and seal carver
- Deng Xiaoping, former leader of China
  - Deng Ken, brother of Deng Xiaoping
  - Deng Shuping, brother of Deng Xiaoping
  - Deng Nan, daughter of Deng Xiaoping
  - Deng Pufang, son of Deng Xiaoping
  - Deng Zhuodi, grandson of Deng Xiaoping
- Deng Xinrui (born 2003), Chinese sprinter
- Deng Yanda, 1895–1931, left-wing general who tried to create a middle ground between the Chinese Communists and Chiang Kai-shek
- Deng Yaping, table tennis player
- Deng Yawen (born 2005), Chinese BMX rider
- Deng Yingchao, wife of Zhou Enlai
- Deng Yuezhang (born 1997), cantopop singer-songwriter
- Deng Yujiao, Chinese woman involved in the Deng Yujiao incident
- Deng Zhi, general of Shu Han during the Three Kingdoms period
- Deng Zhonghan, Chinese electrical engineer and CEO of Vimicro
- Honghao Deng (born 1994), Chinese computational designer and entrepreneur
- Kent Deng, economic historian and writer
- Si-An Deng, Chinese-Canadian badminton player
- Wendi Deng, Chinese-American businesswoman, former wife of Rupert Murdoch

=== Tang ===
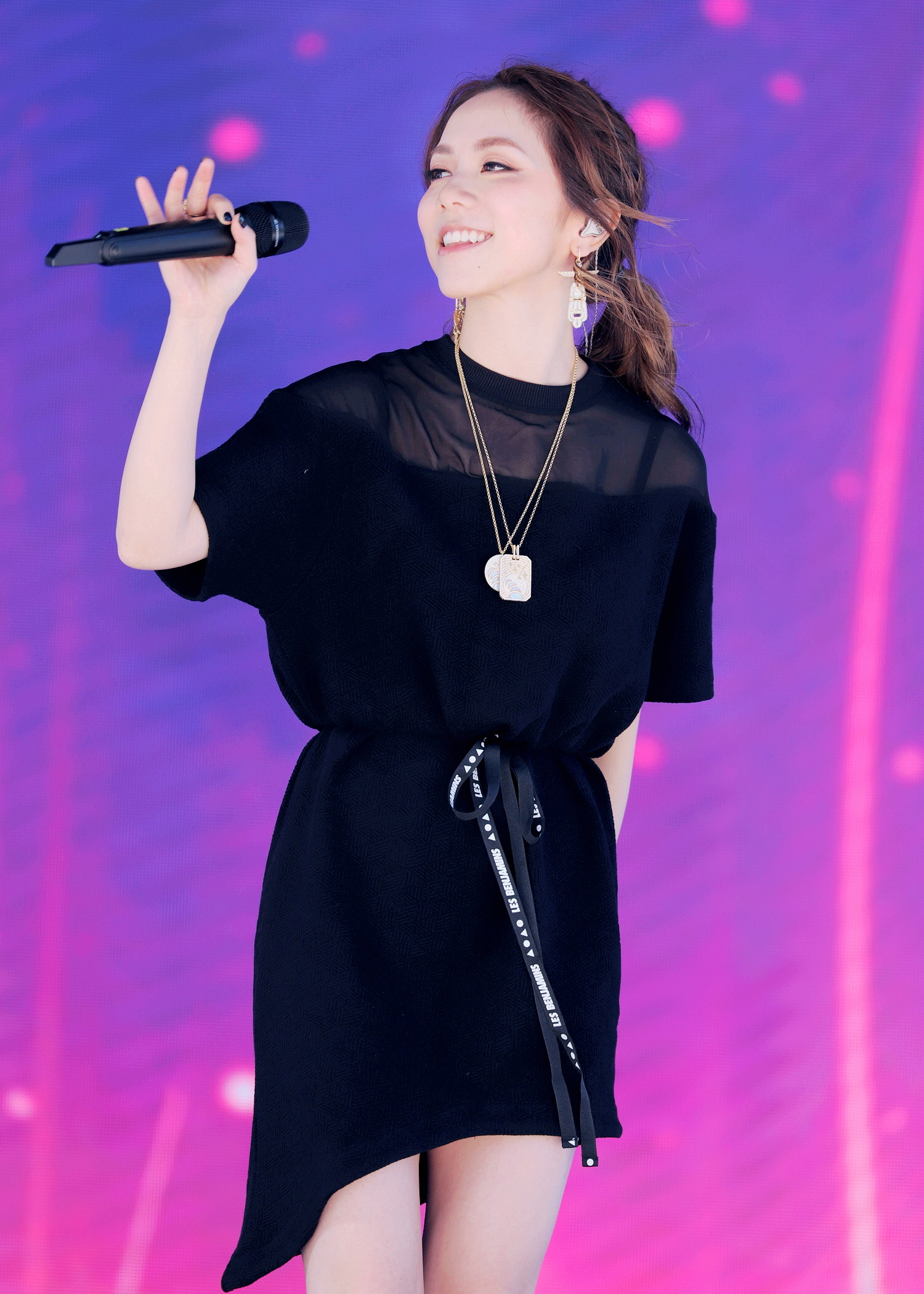
G.E.M. (鄧紫棋)

- Alan Tang (鄧光榮), actor and movie producer
- Tang Wing Cheung (鄧永祥), birth name of Cantonese opera and film actor Sun Ma Sze Tsang (新馬師曾)
- Chris Tang (鄧炳強), commissioner of Hong Kong police
- Tang Tsz-kei, better known as G.E.M. (born 1991), Hong Kong singer
- Stephy Tang (born 1983), Hong Kong Cantopop singer and actress
- Sheren Tang (鄧萃雯), Hong Kong TVB actress
- Patrick Tang, Hong Kong singer, actor, and TV show host
- Shermon Tang Sheung Man (Chinese: 鄧上文), Hong Kong television actress
- Natasha Tang (born Tang Wing Yung, Chinese: 鄧穎欣; 23 August 1992), Hong Kong distance swimmer
- Billy Tang Hin-Shing (Chinese: 鄧衍成), Hong Kong film director
- Robert Tang Kwok-ching, GBM, SBS, JP (Chinese: 鄧國楨; born 7 January 1947), retired Hong Kong judge
- Tang So Ha (邓淑霞), survivor of the Andrew Road triple murders case in 1983
- Stephy Tang (born 1983), Hong Kong Cantopop singer and actress
- Tang Tuck Kan (鄧德根), Malaysia contemporary artist

=== Teng ===
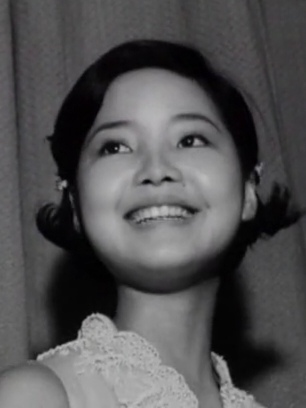
Teresa Teng

- Lee C. Teng (鄧昌黎), accelerator physicist and Robert R. Wilson Prize recipient
- Teng Chia-chi, Deputy Mayor of Taipei
- Teng Yu-hsien, Taiwanese Hakka composer
- Teresa Teng, Taiwanese singer
- Teng Huo-tu, Taiwanese ichthyologist

=== Other romanizations ===
- Tyler Ten (邓伟德), Singaporean actor
- Lydia Dunn, Baroness Dunn, crossbench British Peer
- Patrick Dunn (鄧梓峰), Hong Kong TV personality
- Kanny Theng, Singaporean actress
- Betty Ong, American flight attendant killed during the September 11 attacks.
