= Poverty in China =

Share of population in extreme poverty over time

The majority of poverty in the People's Republic of China (PRC) is rural poverty. Decades of economic development has reduced urban extreme poverty. According to the World Bank, more than 850 million Chinese people have been lifted out of extreme poverty; China's poverty rate fell from 88 percent in 1981 to 0.7 percent in 2015, as measured by the percentage of people living on the equivalent of US$1.90 or less per day in 2011 purchasing price parity terms, which still stands in 2022.

The Chinese definition of extreme poverty is more stringent than that of the World Bank: earning less than $2.30 a day at purchasing power parity (PPP). Growth has fueled a substantial increase in per-capita income, lifting people out of extreme poverty. China's per capita income saw a five-fold increase, from $200 to $1,000 between 1990 and 2000. The same rate of increase was observed from 2000 to 2010, bringing the per capita income up to $5,000. This moved China into the ranks of middle-income countries.

Kent Deng writes in 2000 that by 1978, two thirds of China's rural population had a living standard lower than that of 1958, and under Mao, China became impoverished to a greater extent than India and USSR. Almost half of households lived in poverty in 1978, two years after Mao Zedong's death. It has been argued that unlike in Khrushchev's USSR or even Kim Il Sung's North Korea, under Mao, poverty reduction was not given attention to, and the government instead engaged in "campaigns of class struggle" to distract the people, as poverty perpetuated itself. Nevertheless, under Mao, "China's government provided food and shelter at little or no cost. This meant US$1.90 was able to buy more basic necessities in China than in comparable capitalist countries." According to one measurement, the percentage of the population of China living in extreme poverty fell steadily during most of the time that Mao was in power, although other measurements present a more mixed picture. Prior to the 1978 market reforms, poverty in China was already considered less severe than in other developing nations. According to one journal in 1981, "the poorest of China's poor are better fed, better educated and healthier than the poorest in India and Pakistan, which makes these Chinese less poor." Life expectancy in China, estimated by the World Bank at 64, was 3 years higher than the average for middle-income countries, while studies found that even before 1978 there was less malnutrition in China than other poor nations, while also having higher rates of literacy and school enrolment and a far lower rate of infant mortality. According to one measurement, the percentage of people in rural areas living in poverty fell from 30.7% in 1978 to 3.5% in 2000.

Between 1990 and 2005, China's progress accounted for more than three-quarters of global poverty reduction and was largely responsible for the world reaching the UN millennium development target of halving extreme poverty. This can be attributed to a combination of a rapidly expanding labor market, driven by a protracted period of economic growth, and a series of government transfers, such as an urban subsidy, and the introduction of a rural pension. The World Bank Group said that the percentage of the population living below the international poverty line of $1.9 (2011 PPP) fell to 0.7 percent in 2015, and the poverty line of $3.2 (2011 PPP) fell to 7% in 2015. The percentage of China’s population estimated to be chronically undernourished has also fallen significantly, from 46% in 1970 to 5% in 2010.

At the end of 2018, the number of people living below China's national poverty line of ¥2,300 (CNY) per year (in 2010 constant prices) was 16.6 million, equal to 1.7% of the population at the time. On November 23, 2020, China announced that it had eliminated absolute poverty nationwide by uplifting all of its citizens beyond its set ¥2,300 per year (in 2010 constant prices), or around ¥4,000 per year in 2020. The World Bank has different poverty lines for countries with a different gross national income (GNI). With a GNI per capita of $10,610 in 2020, China is an upper middle-income country. The poverty line for an upper middle-income country is $5.5 per day at PPP. As of 2020, China has succeeded in eradicating absolute poverty, but not the poverty defined for upper middle-income countries which China belongs to. China still has around 13% of its population falling below this poverty line of $5.50 per day in 2020. In 2020, premier Li Keqiang, citing the National Bureau of Statistics (NBS) said that China still had 600 million people living with less than 1000 yuan ($140) a month, although an article from The Economist said that the methodology NBS used was flawed, stating that the figure took the combined income, which was then equally divided.

== Overview ==
Since Deng Xiaoping began instituting market reforms in the late 1970s, China has been among the most rapidly growing economies in the world, regularly exceeding 10 percent GDP growth annually from 1978 through 2010. This growth has led to a substantial increase in real living standards and a marked decline in poverty. Between 1981 and 2008, the proportion of China's population living on less than $1.25/day is estimated to have fallen from 85% to 13.1%, meaning that roughly 600 million people were taken out of extreme poverty. At the same time, this rapid change has brought with it different kinds of stresses. China faces serious natural resource scarcity and environmental degradation. It has also seen growing disparities as people in different parts of the country and with different characteristics have benefited from the growth at different rates.

Starting from the pre-reform situation, some increase in income inequality was inevitable, as favored coastal urban locations benefited from the opening policy, and as the small stock of educated people found new opportunities. However, particular features of Chinese policy may have exacerbated rather than mitigated growing disparities. The household registration (hukou) system kept rural-urban migration below what it otherwise would have been, and contributed to the development of one of the largest rural-urban income divides in the world. Weak tenure over rural land also limited the ability of peasants to benefit from their primary asset.

Aside from income inequality, there has also been an increase in inequality of educational outcomes and health status, partly the result of China's decentralized fiscal system, in which local government has been primarily responsible for funding basic health and education. Poor localities have not been able to fund these services, and poor households have not been able to afford the high private cost of basic education and healthcare.

The large trade surplus that has emerged in China has exacerbated the inequalities, and makes them harder to address. The trade surplus stimulates the urban manufacturing sector, which is already relatively well off. It limits the government's scope to increase funding for public services such as rural health and education. The government has been trying to rebalance China's production away from investment and exports towards domestic consumption and services, to improve the country's long-term macroeconomic health and the situation of the relatively poor in China.

Recent government measures to reduce disparities include relaxation of the hukou system, abolition of the agricultural tax, and increased central transfers to fund health and education in rural areas.

== Poverty reduction ==
Poverty reduction in China by various measures
	Poverty headcount ratio at $1.90 a day (2011 Int$ PPP) (% of population)	Poverty headcount ratio at $3.20 a day (2011 Int$ PPP) (% of population)	Poverty headcount ratio at $5.50 a day (2011 Int$ PPP) (% of population)
1990	66.2	90	98.3
2010	11.2	28.5	53.4
2015	0.7	7	27.2
2019	0.1	1.7	15.8

China's lifting of more than 800 million people out of extreme poverty since the late 1970s has been the largest global reduction in inequality in modern history.

China has maintained a high growth rate for more than 30 years since the beginning of economic reform in 1978. This sustained growth has generated a huge increase in average living standards. 25 years ago, China had many characteristics in common with the rest of developing Asia: large population, low per capita income, and resource scarcity on a per capita basis. But in the 15 years from 1990 to 2005, China averaged per capita growth of 8.7%

The whole reform program is often referred to in brief as the "open door policy". This highlights that a key component of Chinese reform has been trade liberalization and opening up to foreign direct investment, but not opening the capital account more generally to portfolio flows. China improved its human capital, opened up to foreign trade and investment, and created a better investment climate for the private sector.

After joining the WTO China's average tariffs dropped below 10%, and to around 5% for manufactured imports. It initially welcomed foreign investment into "special economic zones". Some of these zones were very large, amounting to urban areas of 20 million people or more. The positive impact of foreign investment in these locations led to a more general opening up of the economy to foreign investment, with the result that China became the largest recipient of direct investment flows in the 1990s.

The opening up measures have been accompanied by improvements in the investment climate, particularly in cities in the coastal areas, where the private sector now accounts for 90% or more of manufacturing assets and production. In 2005, the average pretax rate of return for domestic private firms was the same as that for foreign-invested firms. Local governments in coastal cities have lowered loss of output due to unreliable power supply to 1.0% and customs clearance time for imports has been lowered in Chinese cities to 3.3 days.

China's sustained growth fueled historically unprecedented poverty reduction. The World Bank uses a poverty line based on household real consumption (including consumption of own-produced crops and other goods), set at $1 per day measured at Purchasing Power Parity. In most low-income countries this amount is sufficient to guarantee each person about 1000 calories of nutrition per day, plus other basic necessities. In 2007, this line corresponds to about 2,836 RMB per year. Based on household surveys, the poverty rate in China in 1981 was 63% of the population. This rate declined to 10% in 2004, indicating that about 500 million people have climbed out of poverty during this period.

This poverty reduction has occurred in waves. The shift to the household responsibility system propelled a large increase in agricultural output, and poverty was cut in half over the short period from 1981 to 1987. From 1987 to 1993 poverty reduction stagnated, then resumed again. From 1996 to 2001 there was once more relatively little poverty reduction. Since China joined the WTO in 2001, however, poverty reduction resumed at a very rapid rate, and poverty was cut by a third in just three years.

Taken from the Asian Development Bank, there was an estimated average annual growth rate of 0.5% in China between 2010 and 2015. This brought the Chinese population to 1.37 billion in 2015. As per China's national poverty line, 8.5 percent of people were in poverty in 2013, which decreased to 1.7 percent in 2018.

On 6 March 2020, Xi Jinping, the General Secretary of the Chinese Communist Party, announced that by 2020, China will achieve all poverty alleviation in rural areas. On 28 May 2020, Li Keqiang, the Premier of China, said during the Press Conference of the Premier of the State Council at the end of the two sessions that "China has over 600 million people whose monthly income is barely 1,000 yuan (USD 140) and their lives have further been affected by the coronavirus pandemic."

== Universal Healthcare ==
Michelle Bachelet visited China in May 2022, the first time in 17 years that a UN high commissioner for human rights had traveled to China. In a statement about her visit she wrote "The introduction of universal health care and almost universal unemployment insurance scheme go a long way in ensuring protection of the right to health and broader social and economic rights".

== Increased inequality ==
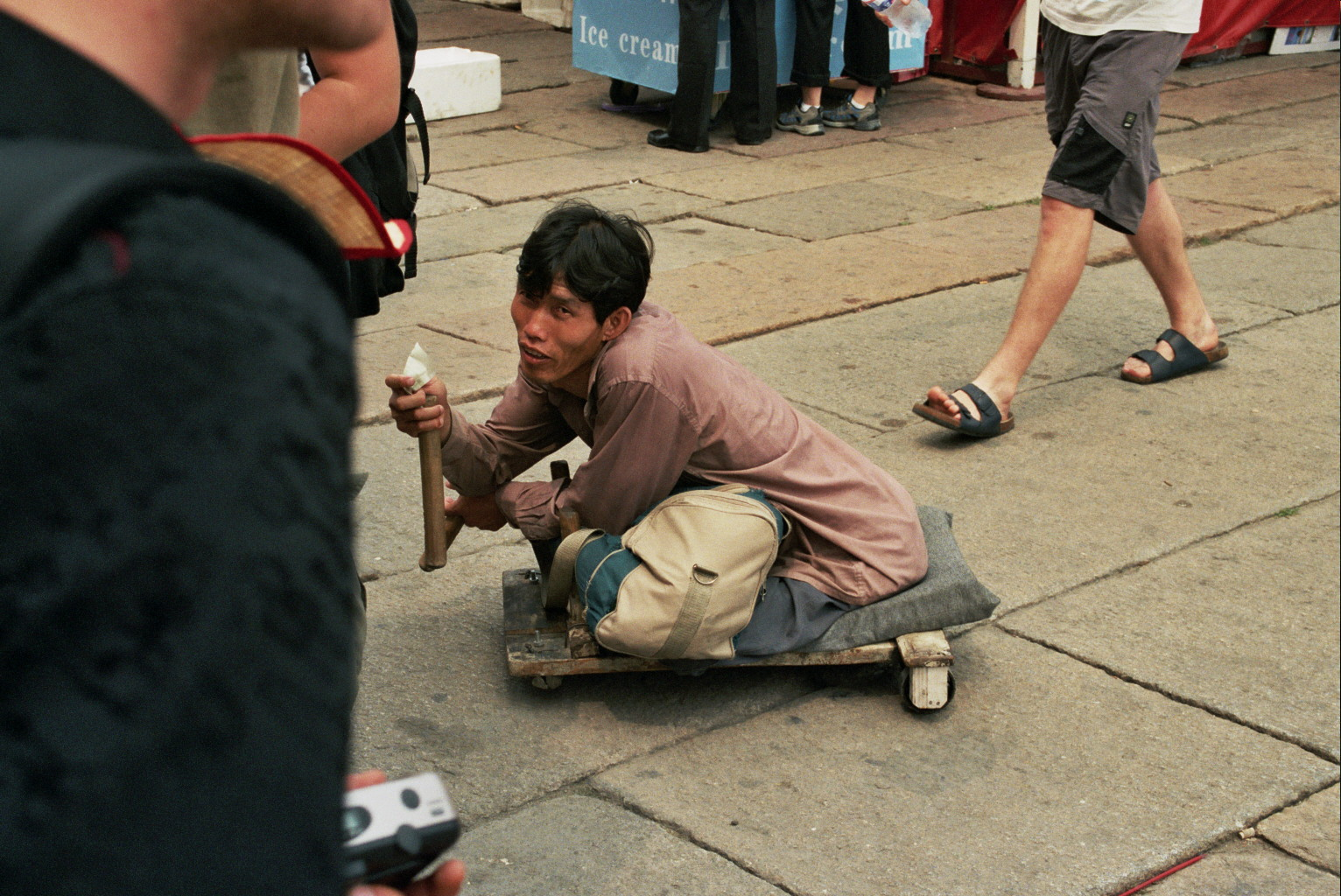
A beggar in Beijing, 2005

China's growth has been so rapid that virtually every household has benefited significantly, fueling the steep drop in poverty. However, different people have benefited to very different extents, so that inequality has risen during the reform and opening up period. This is true for inequality in household income or consumption, as well as for inequality in important social outcomes such as health status or educational attainment. Concerning household consumption, the Gini measure of inequality increased from 0.31 at the beginning of reform to 0.45 in 2004. To some extent this rise in inequality is the natural result of the market forces that have generated the strong growth; but to some extent it is "artificial" in the sense that various government policies exacerbate the tendencies toward higher inequality, rather than mitigate them. Changes to some policies could halt or even reverse the increasing inequality. (See List of countries by income equality.)

The Nobel Prize-winning economist Sir Arthur Lewis noted that "development must be inegalitarian because it does not start in every part of the economy at the same time" in 1954. China classically manifests two of the characteristics of development that Lewis had in mind: rising return to education and rural-urban migration. As an underdeveloped country, China began its reform with relatively few highly educated people, and with a small minority of the population (20%) living in cities, where labor productivity was about twice the level as in the countryside.

In pre-reform China there was very little return to education manifested in salaries. Cab drivers and college professors had similar incomes. Economic reform has created a labor market in which people can search for higher pay, and one result of this is that salaries for educated people have gone up dramatically. In the short period between 1988 and 2003, the wage returns to one additional year of schooling increased from 4% to 11%. This development initially leads to higher overall inequality, because the initial stock of educated people is small and they are concentrated at the high end of the income distribution. But if there is reasonably good access to education, then over time a greater and greater share of the population will become educated, and that will ultimately tend to reduce inequality.

The large productivity and wage gap between cities and countryside also drives a high rate of rural-urban migration, which has left millions of children traumatized due to parents who have left them to be raised by other family members, as the Chinese government does not allow parents who move to urban areas to take their children with them. Lewis pointed out that, starting from a situation of 80% rural, the initial shift of some from low-productivity agriculture to high productivity urban employment is disequalizing. If the flow continues until the population is more than 50% urban, however, further migration is equalizing. This pattern is very evident in the history of the U.S., with inequality rising during the rapid industrialization period from 1870 to 1920, and then declining thereafter. So, the same market forces that have produced the rapid growth in China predictably led to higher inequality. But in China, there are a number of government policies that exacerbate this tendency toward higher inequality and restrict some of the potential mechanisms that would normally lead to an eventual decline in inequality.

=== Rural-urban divide ===
Much of the increase in inequality in China can be attributed to the widening rural-urban divide, particularly the differentials in rural-urban income. A household survey conducted in 1995 showed that the rural-urban income gap accounted for 35% of the overall inequality in China.

In 2009, according to China's National Bureau of Statistics, the urban per capita annual income at US$2,525 was approximately three times that of the rural per capita annual income. This was the widest income gap recorded in China since 1978. Urban-based economic policies adopted by the government contribute to the income disparities. This is also known as the 'artificial' result of the rural-urban divide. In terms of the share of investments allotted by the state, urban areas were given a larger proportion when compared with rural areas. In the period 1986–1992, investments to urban state-owned enterprises (SOE) accounted for more than 25% of the total government budget. On the other hand, less than 10% of the government budget was allocated to investments in the rural economy in the same period by the state despite the fact that about 73-76% of the total population lived in the rural areas. However, the burden of the inflation caused by the fiscal expansion, which at that time was at a level of approximately 8.5%, was shared by all, including the rural population. Such biased allocation of government finances to the urban sector meant that the wages earned by urban workers also include these government fiscal transfers. This is in addition to the relatively higher proportions of credit loans the government also provided to the urban SOEs in the same period. Meanwhile, the wages earned by the rural workers came mainly from growth in output only. These urban-biased policies reflect the importance of the urban minority to the government relative to the rural majority.

In the period when reforms in urban areas were introduced, the real wages earned by urban workers rose inexorably. Restrictions to rural-urban migration protected the urban workers from competition from the rural workers, which therefore also contributed to rural-urban disparities. According to a report by the World Bank published in 2009, 99% of the poor in China come from rural areas if migrant workers in cities are included in the rural population figures. Excluding migrant workers from the rural population figures indicates that 90% of poverty in China is still rural.

Inequality in China does not only occur between rural and urban areas. There exist inequalities within rural areas, and within urban areas themselves. In some rural areas, incomes are comparable to that of urban incomes, while in others, income remains low as development is limited. Rural-urban inequalities do not only refer to income differentials but also include inequalities in areas such as education and health care.

=== Urban poverty in China ===
The structural reforms of China's economy have brought about a widening of the income gap and rising unemployment in cities. The increasing challenge for the Chinese government and social organizations is to address and solve poverty issues in urban areas where people are increasingly being economically and socially marginalized. According to the official estimates, 12 million people were considered as urban poor in 1993, i.e. 3.6 per cent of the total urban population, but by 2006 the figure had jumped to more than 22 million, i.e. 4.1 per cent of the total urban population and these figures are estimated to grow if the government fails to institute any effective measures to circumvent this escalating problem.

China's "floating population" has since helped spur rapid development in the country because of the cheap and plentiful labor they can offer. On the flip side, many people who came from the rural areas are not able to find jobs in the cities. This surplus of rural laborers and mass internal migration will no doubt pose a major threat to the country's political stability and economic growth. Their inabilities to find jobs, compounded by the rising costs of living in the cities, has made many people fall below the poverty line.

There are also large numbers of unemployed and laid-off workers from state-owned enterprises (SOEs). These enterprises have since failed to compete efficiently with the private and foreign-funded companies when China's open-door policy was introduced. In the years 1995 to 2000, the state sector lost 31 million jobs in a process widely known in the Chinese society as Xiagang (下岗), which amounted to 28 per cent of the jobs in the sector. The non-state sector has been creating new jobs, but not in sufficient numbers to offset job losses from the state sector.

SOEs' roles were more than employers, they are also responsible for the provision of welfare benefits, like retirement pensions, incentives for medical care, housing and direct subsidies and the like to its employees, as these burdens greatly increased production costs. In 1992, SOE expenses on insurance and welfare took up 35% of the total wages. Therefore, for millions of state-sector workers, Xiagang not only meant the loss of their jobs, but also the sudden collapse of social benefits and security that they were once so reliant on. The adverse consequences arising from the market reforms are evidently seen as a socially destabilizing factor.

Lastly, the government provided little or no social benefit for the urban poor who needed the most attention. The Ministry of Labor and Social Security (MLSS) was the last line of defense against urban poverty in the provision of social insurance and the living allowance for laid-off employees. However, its effectiveness was limited in scope in which less than a quarter of the eligible urban poor actually receiving assistance.

The Minimum Living Standard Scheme was first implemented in Shanghai in 1993 to help supplement the income of the urban poor. It is a last resort program that is meant to help those that don't qualify for other forms of government aid. The Minimum Living Standard Scheme set regional poverty lines and gave recipients a sum of money. The amount of money received by each recipient was the difference in their income and the poverty line. The Scheme has grown rapidly and has since been adopted by over 580 cities and 1120 counties.

=== Rural Poverty ===
While poverty has been reduced immensely in China over the past decade, it still remains a large problem in rural China. Rural China has historically been disproportionately taxed and also has received fewer benefits from the recent economic development and success of China. Agriculture has been the main occupation for the inhabitants of rural China, and in villages the produce generated is used to feed the village and not for selling on the market. Even in the heartlands of China where agriculture is used for commercial purposes, the economic boom of China has actually led to a decrease in the price of produce which has resulted in a loss of income for these producers.

Children growing up in poverty are more likely to be undernourished, have less educational opportunities, and have lower literacy levels. And those whose parents move to urban areas in an effort to give these children a better life—and are not allowed by the Chinese government to take their children with them—are unintentionally traumatizing and damaging these children. Studies show approximately 70% of the 'left-behind' kids—they are sometimes called the 'lost generation', or the 'damaged generation', suffer from emotional trauma, depression or anxiety. About a third of the left-behind children—20 million—will get involved in crime, while another third will need time in mental health institutions.

The disproportionate amount of inequality in China's rural sector along with correlation between poverty and education shows that children born in rural China are much more likely to score lower on literacy tests and not have the opportunity to pursue higher education.

The implementation of Chinese policy has exacerbated the issue of rural poverty en lieu of increased urban poverty. Typically the urbanization of a country leads to mass migration from the rural areas to the urban. However, the Chinese government implemented a policy that restricts the migration of people born in rural China from coming to urban China. This restriction is based on the citizen's registration under the hukou system, which states if the individual was born in an agricultural (rural) or non-agricultural (urban) area. Additionally, Chinese officials have been cracking down on Chinese migrants from rural communities that have moved to Beijing. In 2017, thousands of migrant workers living in Beijing were evicted because they did not possess an urban hukou. This process of removing migrants from rural to urban China, relocates them back to rural China where they no longer have a job or source of income. This is a relocation of poverty from the urban sector to the rural sector.

The political response of China's government to the issue of rural poverty has been both lauded and criticized. China has been criticized for its high rate of rural poverty and the policies that the government has put in place to ameliorate the poverty. In Transformation of Rural China, Jonathan Unger points out that the lack of taxation at the village level restricts the villages from dealing with the problems they face. This means problems such as food instability and lack of education are not able to be addressed by local officials. Supporters of government policy point out that over the time period of 1978 to 2014, China has reduced rural poverty from 250 million people to just over 70 million people. China's Rural Poverty Alleviation and Development Outline from 2001 to 2010 led to certain government policy directly dealing with the issue of poverty with the removal of agriculture tax in 2006 and a program which the government paid rural families to plant trees on degraded land. More fundamental and radical measures such as directly redistributive taxation and social security systems or land tenure and agricultural produce price reforms are not mentioned here, however: presumably because they are not considered prudent.

=== Unequal educational opportunity ===
Education is a prerequisite for the development of human capital which in turn is an important factor in a country's overall development. Apart from the increasing income inequality, the education sector has long suffered from problems such as funding shortages and unequal allocation of education resources, adding to the disparity between China's urban and rural life; this was exacerbated by the two track system of government's approach to education. The first track is government-supported primary education in urban areas and the second is family-supported primary education in the rural areas.

Rural education has been marginalized by the focus on immediate economic development and the fact that urban education enjoys more attention and investment by the central government. This lack of public funding meant that children of rural families were forced to drop out of school, thus losing the opportunity to further their studies and following the paths of their parents to become low skilled workers with few chances of advancements. This leads to a vicious cycle of poverty. Because of limited educational resources, urban schools were supported by the government while village schools were provided for by the local communities where educational opportunities were possibly constrained depending on local conditions. Thus, there still is a huge gap in teacher preparation and quality of facilities between rural and urban areas.

The two track system was then abolished in 1986 & 1992, to be replaced by the Compulsory Education Law and the Rule for the Implementation of the Compulsory Education Law respectively. Despite the emphasis of China's education reform on providing quality and holistic education, the rural schools still lack the capacity to implement such reforms vis-à-vis their urban counterparts. The rural areas lack the educational resources of the urban areas and the rural areas are considered to be falling below the educational benchmark set in the cities. Teachers are more attracted to urban sectors with higher pay and a slew of benefits. In addition, rural villages have a difficult time finding quality teachers because of the lower standard of living in villages. As a result, some rural teachers are not qualified as they received college degrees from continuing-education programs, which is not the best type of further education one could receive.

As a result, rural students often find themselves neither competitive enough to gain admissions to colleges nor employable for most occupations. Rural residents are increasingly being marginalised in higher education, closing off their best opportunities for advancement. This is especially prominent in Tsinghua and Peking University where the percentage of rural population studying in the two universities have shrunk to 17.6 percent in 2000 and 16.3 percent in 1999, down from 50 to 60 percent in the 1950s. These numbers are the most recent reliable data that has been published and experts agree that the number might be as low as 1 percent in 2010.

== Restrictions on migration ==
Pre-reform China had a system that severely restricted people's mobility, and that system has only slowly been reformed over the past 25 years. Each person has a registration (hukou) in either a rural area or an urban area, and cannot change the hukou without the permission of the receiving jurisdiction. In practice cities usually give registration to skilled people who have offers of employment, but have generally been reluctant to provide registration to migrants from the countryside. Nevertheless, these migrants are needed for economic development, and large numbers have in fact migrated. Many of these fall into the category of "floating population". There are nearly 200 million rural residents who spend at least six months of the year working in urban areas. Many of these people have for all practical purposes moved to a city, but they do not have official registration. Beyond the floating population, there are tens of millions of people who have left rural areas and obtained urban hukous.

So, there is significant rural-urban migration in China, but it seems likely that the hukou system has resulted in less migration than otherwise would have occurred. There are several pieces of evidence to support this view. First, the gap in per capita income between rural and urban areas widened during the reform period, reaching a ratio of three to one. Three to one is a very high gap by international standards. Second, manufacturing wages have risen sharply in recent years, at double-digit rates, so that China now has considerably higher wages than much of the rest of developing Asia (India, Vietnam, Pakistan, Bangladesh). This rise is good for the incumbent workers, but they are relatively high up in China's income distribution, so that the wage increases raise inequality. It is hard to imagine that manufacturing wages would have risen so rapidly if there had not been such controls on labor migration. Third, recent studies focusing on migrants have shown that it is difficult for them to bring their families to the city, put their children in school, and obtain healthcare. So, the growth of the urban population must have been slowed down by these restrictions.

China's urbanization so far has been a relatively orderly process. One does not see in China the kinds of slums and extreme poverty that exist in cities throughout South Asia, Latin America, and Africa. Nevertheless, urbanization goes on: the urban share of China's population has risen from 20% to 40% during the course of economic reform. But at the same time the hukou system has slowed and distorted urbanization, without preventing it. The system has likely contributed to inequality by limiting the opportunities of the relatively poor rural population to move to better-paying employment.

== Land policy ==
Just as Chinese citizens are either registered as urban or rural under the Hukou system, land in China is zoned as either rural or urban. Under Chinese property law, there is no privately held land. Urban land is owned by the state, which grants land rights for a set number of years. Reforms in the late 1980s and 1990s allowed for transactions in urban land, enabling citizens to sell their land and buildings, or mortgage them to borrow, while still retaining state ownership. Rural, or "collectively owned land", is leased by the state for periods of 30 years, and is theoretically reserved for agricultural purposes, housing and services for farmers. Peasants have long-term tenure as long as they sow the land, but they cannot mortgage or sell the use rights. The biggest distortion, however, concerns moving land from rural to urban use. China is a densely populated, water-scarce country whose comparative advantage lies more in manufacturing and services than in agriculture. The fact that many peasants cannot earn a decent living as farmers is a signal that their labor is more useful in urban employment, hence the hundreds of millions of people who have migrated. But, at the same time, it is efficient to allocate some of the land out of agriculture for urban use.

In China, that conversion is handled administratively, requiring central approval. Farmers are compensated based on the agricultural value of the land. But the reason to convert land – especially in the fringes around cities – is that the commercial value of the land for urban use is higher than its value for agriculture. So, even if China's laws on land are followed scrupulously, the conversion does not generate a high income for the peasants. There are cases in which the conversion is done transparently, the use of rights over the land auctioned, and the revenue collected put into the public budget to finance public goods. But still the peasants get relatively poor recompense. One government study found that 62% of displaced peasants were worse off after land conversion.

Secure land tenure is recognized as a powerful tool to reduce poverty, and the central government has begun guaranteeing all farmers 30-year land rights, strictly limiting expropriations, documenting and publicizing farmers' rights, and requiring sufficient compensation when farmers' lands are expropriated. A 2010 survey of 17 provinces by Landesa found improved documentation of farmer's land rights, but much room for improvement: 63% of farming families have been issued land-rights certificates and 53% have land-rights contracts, but only 44% have been issued both documents (as is required by law) and 29% have no document at all; farmers who have been issued these documents are far more likely to make long-term investments in their land and are financially benefiting from those investments.

== Fiscal system and rural social services ==
Market reform has dramatically increased the return to education, as it indicates that there are good opportunities for skilled people and as it creates a powerful incentive for families to increase the education of their children. However, there needs to be strong public support for education and reasonably fair access to the education system. Otherwise, inequality can become self-perpetuating: if only high-income people can educate their children, then that group remains a privileged, high-income group permanently. China is at some risk of falling into this trap, because it has developed a highly decentralized fiscal system in which local governments rely primarily on local tax collection to provide basic services such as primary education and primary health care. China in fact has one of the most decentralized fiscal systems in the world.

China is much more decentralized than OECD countries and middle-income countries, particularly on the spending side. More than half of all expenditure takes place at the sub-provincial level. In part, the sheer size of the country explains this degree of decentralization, but the structure of government and some unusual expenditure assignments also give rise to this pattern of spending. Functions such as social security, justice, and even the production of national statistics are largely decentralized in China, whereas they are central functions in most other countries.

Fiscal disparities among subnational governments are larger in China than in most OECD countries. These disparities have emerged alongside a growing disparity in economic strength among the provinces. From 1990 to 2003, the ratio of per capita GDP of the richest to the poorest province grew from 7.3 to 13. In China, the richest province has more than 8 times the per capita public spending than the poorest province. In the US, the poorest state has about 65 percent of the revenues of the average state, and in Germany, any state falling below 95 percent of the average level gets subsidized through the "Finanzausgleich" (and any receiving more than 110 percent gets taxed). In Brazil, the richest state has 2.3 times the revenues per capita of the poorest state.

Inequalities in spending are even larger at the sub-provincial level. The richest county, the level that is most important for service delivery, has about 48 times the level of per capita spending of the poorest county. These disparities in aggregate spending levels also show up in functional categories such as health and education, where variation among counties and among provinces is large.

These differences in public spending translate into differences in social outcomes. Up through 1990, there were only modest differences across provinces in infant survival rate, but by 2000, there had emerged a very sharp difference, closely related to the province's per capita GDP. So too with the high-school enrollment rate: there used to be small differences across provinces. By 2003, high-school enrollment was nearing 100% in the wealthier provinces while still less than 40% in poor provinces.

There is some redistribution within China's fiscal system, but arguments abound as to whether it is enough. Poor areas have very little tax collection and hence cannot fund education and health care. Some of their population will relocate over time. But for reasons of both national efficiency and opportunity, some theoretical economists argue for the communist state to ensure everyone has some basic education and basic health care.

China's highly decentralized fiscal system results in: local government in many locations not having adequate resources to fund basic social services. As a consequence, households are left to pay for their own needs to a remarkable extent. The average hospital visit in China in 2018 is paid 35% out-of-pocket by the patient, compared to 25% in Mexico, 17% in Australia, 10% in Turkey and the United States, and lower amounts in most developed countries. Poor households either forego treatment or travel to other cities for treatment, which can be expensive if the condition is severe. In the 2003 National Health Survey, 30% of poor households identified a large health care expenditure as the reason that they were having financial difficulties.

The situation in education is similar. In a survey of 3037 villages in 2004, average primary school fees were 260 yuan and average middle-school fees, 442 yuan. A family living right at the dollar-a-day poverty line would have about 900 yuan total resources for a child for a year; sending a child to middle-school would take half of that. Not surprisingly, then, enrollment rates are relatively low in poor areas and for poor families.

== Women In Poverty ==
In China, women are more vulnerable to suffer from severe poverty than men. More women experience multidimensional poverty (38.9% compared to 25.2%). Many individual and social characteristics shape women's experiences on poverty, such as age, education, employment, family structure, family size, urban or rural areas, etc.

In terms of individual factors, women are less likely to complete their primary education, have worse health and nutrition, and are more likely to endure chronic diseases, hospitalization, and low income. Women's education is less valued by their parents. As mothers, women are expected to value their children's care work more than their own careers. In addition, the gender inequalities in the labor market are pervasive. The labor force participation rate of women has declined since the economic reforms, and financial hardship has been severe among women. In terms of marital factors, research shows that single mothers suffer the most from poverty. On the one hand, social and public policies are usually inadequate for single-parent families, especially families headed by women. On the other hand, Chinese traditional beliefs on family see divorce as negative, and often push mothers to sacrifice themselves to fulfill their children. Age is also a factor that contributes to women's poverty. Research shows that women have a lower chance of receiving less occupational pension and receive less benefit (women receive 595 yuan per month, whereas men receive 1,105 yuan). Also, women in their 50s are more likely to take the responsibility of caring for their elderly parents and grandchildren; therefore more likely to retire earlier and receive less money in their pensions.

In terms of regional factors, women who live in remote and less developed western regions are more likely to live in poverty than eastern area. For example, women living in Guizhou and Gansu provinces have the highest multidimensional poverty rate. Many women in poverty immigrate from their hometown to another province in order to improve their living situation, and many use marriage as an approach. (Research shows much more women migrated from relatively less developed regions to more developed regions through marriage than men). Some women did get out of absolute poverty through marriage; however, because of limited opportunities, they are likely to fall into relative poverty soon after relocation. Also, migrant wives often suffer from perpetuated poverty after marriage.

At the state level, it is hard to find official data on women in poverty and poverty reduction programs tend to focus more on men, which widens the gender inequality. A research focused on a poverty reduction program in Inner Mongolia shows that women's empowerment programs can have positive effects on poverty reduction. It suggests that if poverty programs can be more gender-focused, women and their households in poverty can benefit more from interventions such as training, cooperatives, and credit.

== See also ==
=== China articles ===
- Demographics of China
- Digital divide in China
- List of minimum wages in China (PRC)

=== General articles ===
- Cycle of poverty
- Diseases of poverty
- Deprivation index
- Economic inequality
- Feminization of poverty
- Food security
- Food vs fuel
- Fuel poverty
- Green Revolution
- Hunger
- Income disparity
- Life expectancy
- List of countries by percentage of population living in poverty
- List of famines
- Literacy
- Minimum wage
- New Rural Reconstruction Movement
- Pauperism
- Poverty threshold
- Poverty trap
- Street children
- The Hunger Site
- Working poor

=== Organizations and campaigns ===
- ActionAid efforts in dealing with income inequality in China
- List of charities in China
- List of NGOs in China
- Wokai - Organization that allows people to contribute directly to microfinance institutions in China
- Young China Scholars Poverty Research Network
