= Chan Kwan Lap =

Chinese ink painter

Eddy Chan Kwan Lap
- Born: 27 May 1947 (age 79); Xinhui, Guangdong, China
- Education: CUHK (certificate); Concordia University (BFA); RMIT University (MFA)
- Known for: Chinese ink painting

Eddy Chan Kwan Lap (Chinese: 陳君立; born 27 May 1947) is a modern Chinese ink painter. He finished a certificate course in modern Chinese ink painting and was awarded a bachelor's degree and a master's degree in fine arts. His works are in the collections of both local and overseas museums and art institutes, such as the Hong Kong Museum of Art, Shanghai Foreign Culture Exchange Association (China), Daegu Culture and Art Centre (South Korea), and the 1997 Mountain Lake Collection (United States).

== Biography ==
Chan Kwan Lap was born on 27 May 1947 in Xinhui, Guangdong, China. He practised traditional Chinese shan shui painting until he chanced upon modernist Chinese painter Liu Kuo-sung's graduation exhibition in 1978. He was deeply moved by the differences between modern ink painting creation and traditional shan shui, which pushed him to pursue a modern Chinese ink painting certificate from the Department of Extramural Studies of the Chinese University of Hong Kong in 1981. Afterwards, Eddy Chan went to Canada, where he received a bachelor's degree in fine arts from Concordia University in 1985. He was also awarded a master's degree in fine arts by RMIT University in 2006.

== Artwork ==
Most of his artwork focused on the motifs of tree trunks, roots, and landscape, and he refers to the years spanning 1986-1990 as the 'Root Period' Roots represent the perseverance, potential, and source of life and culture, through which Chan expresses his hope and optimism for the future. After moving to Canada for his studies, the Canadian landscape inspired him to incorporate snow and springtime into the themes of his pieces. 1991-1995 was an important transition phase in his Chinese ink painting.

Chan intentionally made use of a non-traditional way of ink painting. Chan said that the Bible, his art teacher, and his wife were his inspiration.

== Awards ==
The accolades received by Chan Kwan Lap are as follows:

- "Creativity in the Modern Interpretation of Ink & Colour" by the Taipei Fine Arts Museum
- Distinction in the "Beijing International Ink & Wash Painting Exhibition 88" by the Academy of Chinese Painting
- Distinction in "The Grand Competition of Modern Chinese Ink Painting and Calligraphy" by the Foreign Culture Exchange Association of China
- Special Invitation Honor Prize at the 4th Contemporary Chinese Landscape Painting Exhibition
- Prize of creativity in the "5th Contemporary Chinese Landscape Painting Exhibition" by the Central Chinese Ink Painting and Calligraphy Academy in Hunan, China.

== Collections ==
Chan's artworks were included in the following collections:

=== Asia ===
- Malaysia Institute of Art
- Taegu Culture & Art Centre (Korea)
- The Association of Creative Japanese Contemporary Arts (Japan)

==== Hong Kong ====
- Hong Kong Museum of Art
- First Institute of Art and Design
- Museum Section of the Regional Services Department of Hong Kong
- Tai Kung Po (Chinese Newspaper)

Mainland China

- The Museum of Hu Nan Central Academy of Arts (China)
- Jiangsu Province Museum of Art (China)
- Chengdu Modern Art Exhibition Hall (China)
- Shanghai Foreign Culture Exchange Association (China)
- Tianyi Pavilion Museum of Arts (China)

==== Taiwan ====
- Taiwan Art Education Institute (Taiwan)
- Taipei Fine Arts Museum (Taiwan)
- Taiwan Museum of Art (Taiwan)

=== Overseas ===
- 1997 Mountain Lake Collection (USA)
- Phoenix Art Museum

=== Others ===
- Private collectors

== Selected in publications ==
His works have been selected and included in various publications:

- The selected Works of Modern Chinese Landscape Paintings
- The Dictionary of Famous Artists and Masterpieces of Chinese Art & Calligraphy (Vol.II)
- The Chinese Contemporary Masters of Arts" (Vol.II) and "The Dictionary of the Achievements of World Chinese Artists
- Record of the World Famous People
- The Dictionary of Chinese People‧The Book of Contemporary Grand Culture
- The Modern Art History of China
- The book of 200 selected top artworks for the Chinese New Era Landscape Painting
