= Lee Teng =

Lee Teng may refer to:

- Lee Teng (Singapore) (born 1984), Singaporean television host
- Lee C. Teng, American physicist
