= Eddie See Yew Lee =

Malaysian Chinese comic artist

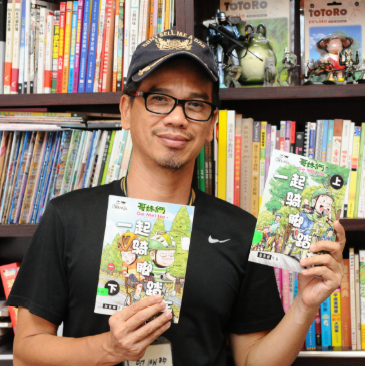
- Eddie See with his Kokko & May works (2017)
- Born: 徐有利; 23 November 1965 (age 60); Kuala Lumpur, Malaysia
- Education: Sekolah Jenis Kebangsaan (Cina) Nan Kai; Tsun Jin High School; Malaysian Institute of Art
- Occupation: Cartoonist
- Years active: 1997 - present
- Organization: Pinko Creative
- Notable work: Gemeilia: Kokko & May; Yap Ah Loy Comic; Japanese Occupation of Malaya; Xian Tu Wei Kuai
- Children: 4
- Website: www.facebook.com/gemeilia

Eddie See Yew Lee
- Chinese: 徐有利
Transcriptions
Standard Mandarin
- Hanyu Pinyin: Xú Yǒulì

Eddie See Yew Lee (Traditional and simplified Chinese: 徐有利, born 23 November 1965), also known as Eddie See or See Yew Lee, is a Malaysian cartoonist. His notable works are Gemeilia: Kokko & May, Yap Ah Loy Comic, Japanese Occupation of Malaya and Xian Tu Wei Kuai.

== Early life ==
The cultivation of Eddie See Yew Lee's drawing skills began in the third and fourth year of primary school. Ertong Leyuan, Nanyang Erton, Doraemon and other comics were his childhood favorite books. Wong Yuk-long and Alfonso Wong, the Hong Kong comic artists of Oriental Heroes and Old Master Q respectively, became the symbols of his admiration. He started submitting comic manuscripts to Hong Kong's Duze Manhua Tiandi during the exact year. On the next year, he drew cartoons in his exercise books and introduced them to his classmates.

After graduating from high school, Eddie See went to the Malaysian Institute of Art to receive a pure art education. However, due to inconsistencies between his studies with his own interests, he dropped out after more than a year of education, and later worked as an embroidery mold draftsman and a lifeguard. He also became a random worker in the United States and a Japanese factory logo designer. During the late 1980s, Eddie See became the first illustrator of United Publishing House in Sri Petaling, Kuala Lumpur, creating illustration for Malaysian textbooks and children's wall stickers.

== Career ==
=== Creation of Gemeilia: Kokko & May ===
Enhancing the status of local comic artists, especially Chinese Malaysian artists, has long been one of my aspirations. I consider it as my duty to contribute to this cause to the best of my ability. In my view, comics will become increasingly important, mainly because computer technology is advancing by leaps and bounds. The future will be a sensory world dominated by images, and comics are essential in completing the visual medium. Therefore, comics are bound to develop rapidly along this mainstream path!

— Eddie See Yew Lee, "Notes from 2001", Kokko & May: The Ball Story (2008)

After gaining experience in professional drawings and book publishing specifications, he officially joined the comic industry in 1997 and became one of the special current affairs comic authors of Sin Chew Daily and Nanyang Siang Pau. Eddie See took advantage of the nearly absence of Malaysia children's comic market to begin his career. In 1997, the sales of Kokko & May: The First Volume were sluggish, with only two to three thousand copies sold; the second book, The Mischievous Siblings, took a year to sell the complete five thousand copies. Back in the late 1990s and early 2000s, Malaysia education system still regarded comics as the undesirable reading materials that were full of violence or eroticism. They were also known as the banned items in schools. Until 2003, Gemeilia: Kokko & May changed its publication format to monthly publication, released the total amount of twenty thousand copies, and took opportunity to introduce his campus reading materials to various Chinese primary schools. After more than one year of stable sales, Eddie See resigned from United Publishing House and switched to become a full-time comic artist. In 2008, Eddie See became the first chairman of the Malaysian Chinese Comics Association. He also established Ge Mei Art Studio in September 2009.

Thanks to its healthy comic content, after few years of massive publication, Gemeilia: Kokko & May became popular in Malaysia, Singapore and Brunei. It was well received among Malaysian Chinese primary school students. By 2009, the monthly sales of Gemeilia: Kokko & May comic books had reached 150,000 copies. During 2011, it was also promoted to mainland China.

=== Pinko Creative establishment ===
In 2012, in order to promote Malaysia's high-quality animation industry to overseas and discover new comics talents, Eddie See founded Pinko Creative.

== Style ==
Eddie See is a left-handed person that skills in traditional and digital paintings. His comic creation method is mainly based on the characteristics of Malaysian and Japanese comics (a mixture of left to right comic panels, and the principle of "introduction (ki), development (shō), transition (ten) and conclusion (ketsu)" of yonkoma). For traditional arts, he uses A4 white paper weighing more than 100 grams, technical pens and brushes.

== Personal life ==
Eddie See's ancestral home is Fuqing, Fujian, China. He is the youngest of the five siblings. His late father (died in 2007) was the owner of Kedai Makan Yew Lee in Jalan Loke Yew, Kuala Lumpur. Eddie See is married and blessed with three sons and one daughter. His children have made low-key debuts in Gemeilia: Kokko & May monthly issues and all are given the nicknames as "the Dinosaurs". He also raises two pet cats named Coco and Dudu.

Eddie See suffered from heart disease and dengue fever while pursuing his career. These mentioned medical records have been recreated as the comic stories of Gemeilia: Kokko & May.

Eddie See's hobbies are shopping, reading, watching television shows, playing computer games, swimming and sleeping. He is also interested in paying attention to Malaysian politics. On 29 August 2021, he expressed his inappropriate comments on Facebook regarding China government's curbing the image of "sissy", which subsequently sparked heated discussions and controversies among countless Malaysian netizens.

== Works ==
- Gemeilia: Kokko & May series
  - Kokko & May issues (Simplified Chinese)
  - Kokko & May Comics Collection (Simplified Chinese, Malay and English)
  - Kokko & May: E-Learning issues (Simplified Chinese)
  - Kokko & May: The First Volume (Simplified Chinese)
  - The Mischievous Siblings (Simplified Chinese)
- Uncle Yew Lee series
  - Youli Qixing Gushi
  - Youli Shushu de Jiaqi Luyou
  - Shuangshi Manhua Gushi
- Others
  - Xian Tu Wei Kuai
  - Yap Ah Loy Comic
  - Japanese Occupation of Malaya
  - Wu Lian De Comic

== Awards ==
- 2006 CACC Golden Dragon Awards (Kokko & May: Teardrops in Blue).
- 2010 Anugerah Buku Perpustakaan Negara Malaysia.
