= Asia Choral Grand Prix =

International choral competition

- Genre: Choral music
- Frequency: Annual
- Inaugurated: 8 August 2019
- Previous event: 26–28 February 2026, Songdo, South Korea
- Next event: August 2027, Manila, Philippines

The Asia Choral Grand Prix (commonly abbreviated as ACGP) is an annual choral competition between the winners of five Asian choral competitions. It was inaugurated in 2019.

The Asia Choral Grand Prix's Organizing Committee aims "to elevate the overall quality and appreciation of the choral art, and inspire audiences and artists through choral music by uniting the outstanding festivals and competitions in Asia".

== Organizing committee and member cities ==
The Asia Choral Grand Prix is organized by the organizing committees of the following choral competitions, from which the ACGP competitors are selected:

1. Andrea O. Veneracion International Choral Festival (AOVICF), Philippines
2. Bali International Choir Festival (BICF), Indonesia
3. Korea International Choir Competition (KICC), South Korea
4. Malaysian Choral Eisteddfod International Choir Festival (MCE), Malaysia
5. Singapore International Choral Festival (SICF), Singapore

The hosting of each annual ACGP competition is rotated among the five-member countries.

== History ==
The Asia Choral Grand Prix was inspired by the European Grand Prix for Choral Singing. The competition was initiated by the Cultural Center of the Philippines, who also organize the Andrea O. Veneracion International Choral Festival, through meetings with the Singapore International Choral Festival and the Bali International Choir Festival organizers which first took place in July 2017. During the closing and awarding ceremonies of the competition's first edition, the Malaysian Choral Eisteddfod International Choir Festival was introduced as the new ACGP festival member.

== Winners ==
=== Winners per year ===
Winners and participants of the Asia Choral Grand Prix per year
Year	Host	Winning choir	Conductor	Country of origin	Other participants	Ref.
2019 (1st)	Pasay City, Philippines	University of the Philippines Los Baños Choral Ensemble	Roijin Suarez	Philippines	(Indonesia) Brawijaya University Student Choir; (Indonesia) e Deum Voice; (Indonesia) Paduan Suara Mahasiswa Universitas Padjadjaran; (Indonesia) St. Louis High School Choir; (Indonesia) Vocalista Harmonic Choir ISI	
2023 (Note: The second edition of ACGP was initially set on 2021, but was moved to 2023 due to the COVID-19 pandemic.) (2nd)	Bali, Indonesia	Landarbaso abesbatza	Iñaki Tolaretxipi	Spain	(Indonesia) Paduan Suara Mahasiswa Swara Wadhana UNY; (Malaysia) M.I.A Men's Chorus; (Philippines) Don Bosco Makati - Boscorale; (Philippines) Far Eastern University Chorale; (Taiwan) Tamkang Fluxingers	
2024 (3rd)	Kuala Lumpur, Malaysia	Diponegoro Engineering Student Choir	Bagus S. Utomo	Indonesia	(Indonesia) Brawijaya University Student Choir; (Indonesia) ITS Student Choir; (Philippines) St. Paul College Pasig High School Chorale	
2025 (4th)	Central Area, Singapore	Sola Gratia Chorale	Cyril Punay	Philippines	(Indonesia) Vocalista Harmonic Choir ISI; (Philippines) University of Mindanao Chorale; (South Korea) Cheorwon Boys and Girls Choir; (South Korea) Korea Choir	
2026 (5th)	Songdo, South Korea	Eastern Chamber Singers	Anna Abeleda-Piquero	Philippines	(Indonesia) Bali Choral Academy; (Indonesia) Borneo Cantata; (Indonesia) Gita Maizan Choir; (South Korea) JOA Choir	
2027 (6th)	Manila, Philippines	TBD			(Philippines) Far Eastern University Chorale; (Indonesia) Paduan Suara Mahasiswa Universitas Padjadjaran; (Philippines) Philippine Charity Sweepstakes Office Chorale; Voices of Singapore Youth Choir; (Hong Kong) Diocesan Boys’ School Choir	

=== Winners per country ===
Country	Wins	Year
Philippines	3	2019, 2025, 2026
Indonesia	1	2024
Spain	1	2023
