= Tang Tuck Kan =

Malaysian Chinese artist (1934-2012)

Tang Tuck Kan 鄧德根
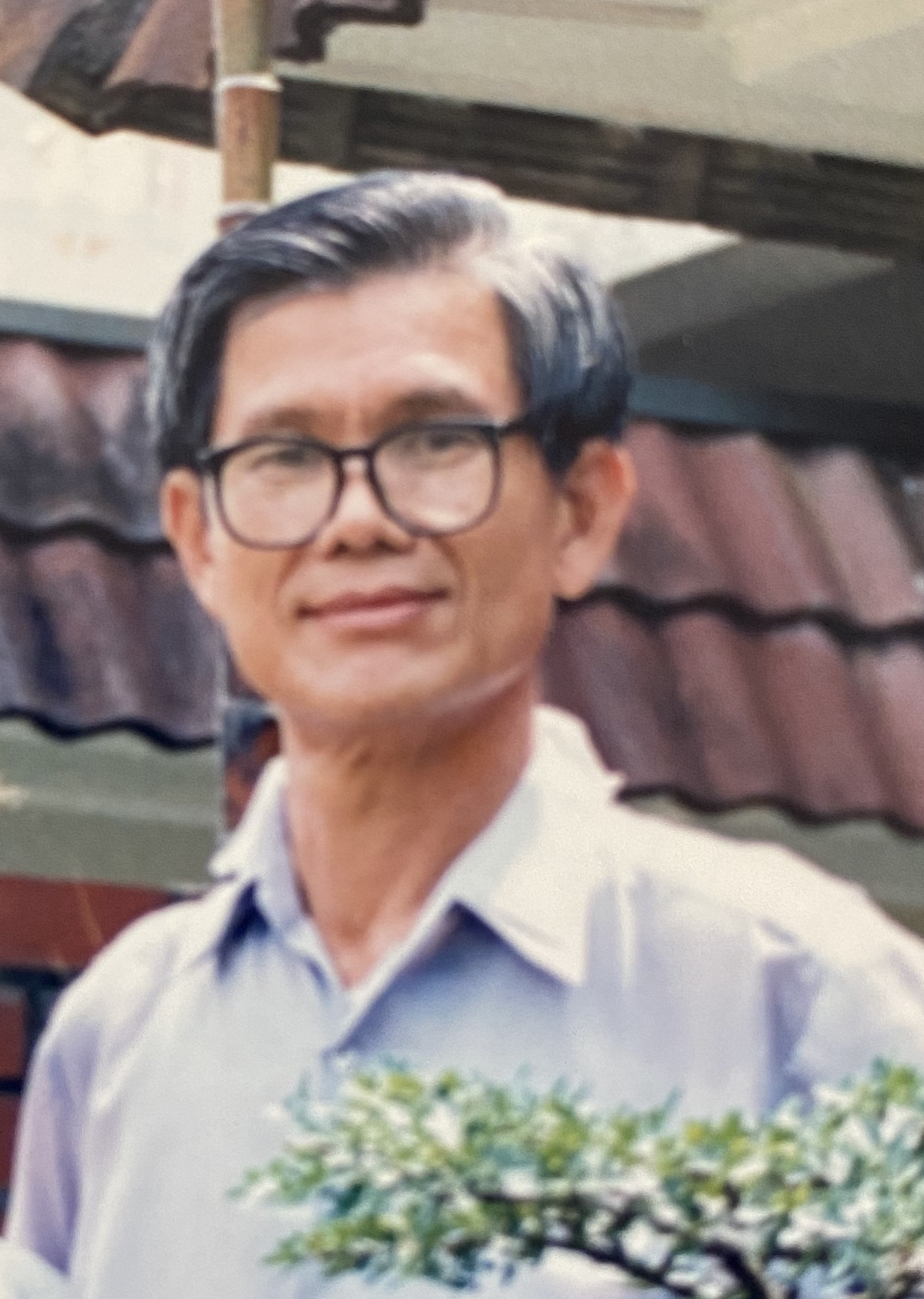
- Born: Tang Tuck Kan; September 10, 1934; Ipoh, Perak, Malaya
- Died: 2012 (aged 77–78)
- Education: Saint Martins School of Art
- Known for: Painting, drawing, watercolor, mixed media, modern art
- Movement: Hard Edge, Abstract Expressionism, Malaysian Modern Art, Malaysian Art in the 60s and 70s

Chinese name
- Traditional Chinese: 鄧德根
- Simplified Chinese: 邓德根
Transcriptions
Standard Mandarin
- Hanyu Pinyin: Dèng Dégēn
- IPA: [jáŋ tsɹ̩̀.tɕʰjʊ́ŋ]
Yue: Cantonese
- Jyutping: Dang6 Dak1 Gan1
- IPA: [jœŋ˩ tsi˧˥.kʰɪŋ˩]

Tang Tuck Kan (Chinese: 鄧德根; pinyin: Dèng Dégēn; Jyutping: Dang6 Dak1 Gan1, 1934–2012) is a Malaysian artist. Tang was known in the late 60's and 70's for his abstract expressionism, "Hard Edge" space identity in Malaysian Art World. His iconic masterpiece, "49 Squares" is the permanent collection at the National Art Gallery of Malaysia in Kuala Lumpur. Towards his later year, he fused his "Hard Edge" concept with the Chinese I-Ching philosophy, created a modern art masterpieces inspired by his own cultural root.

In the early years, Tang pursued his Fine Arts education in UK after he was granted the British Commonwealth Fulbright Scholarship. In 1966, Tang graduated from the prestigious Saint Martin's School of Art in London, UK, which is the Central Saint Martins Arts and Design College under the University of Arts in London. At his later age of life, he created new landscape paintings that married the western composition and watercolor technique to ordinary Chinese painting composition. His landscape paintings quickly became popular in the 80's and 90's. Comfortable as a realist, figurative, portraiture and modern artist, he excelled in all given medium as his artistic presentation.

As an Academician, he was once a senior art teacher at St. Johns Institution, Kuala Lumpur; a lecturer at Institut Teknologi MARA (ITM), which later becomes the Universiti Teknologi Mara (UiTM). Among well-known Malaysian artists who once were his students include Ismail Latiff and Anuar Rashid. Throughout his career, he co-founded Malaysian Institute of Art (MIA) and Kuala Lumpur College of Art (KLCA) with a group of Malaysian Chinese artists.

Tang had solo exhibitions in 1971, 1976 and 1977. He was invited to commission an artwork for the 10th São Paulo Art Biennial in Brazil, 1969, Brazil, Expo '70 in Osaka, Japan and several exhibitions in Canada, Australia and New Zealand.
