= Young China Scholars Poverty Research Network =

The Young China Scholars Poverty Research Network co-sponsored by the Canadian organisations the International Development Research Centre (IDRC) and the Centre for International Governance Innovation (CIGI) was created to identify and support a new generation of young researchers working on poverty and distribution issues in China.

== Aim ==
The aim of the Network is to work with young scholars in China to explore new analytical approaches to poverty research and through this process to more fully harness and use existing poverty survey data.

== History ==
The Network was launched in the summer of 2005 and is coordinated by Li Shi (Beijing Normal University, China) and John Whalley (University of Western Ontario and CIGI, Canada).

== Mentorship ==
There are fifteen mentors offering advice and instruction to young scholars on their research. All Network members meet annually providing young scholars the opportunity to present their research findings; the Network also organizes a series of seminars held at the Beijing Normal University.

== Projects ==
Currently, the network offers financial support to thirteen young Chinese researchers whose project work is guided by senior network members. All papers are cited and are free to download (through the Creative Commons license).

Each of the young scholars presents initial proposals for their research to a network meeting, and each receives comment, feedback and—subsequently—mentoring for the further development of their work. They are given opportunities to interact with established scholars of completed work at feature presentations as well as policy debriefings and research direction discussions.

The network is built around an organizing committee that involves both senior and junior participant researchers from key institutions in China and outside non Chinese researchers. The last network meeting was held in spring 2008. CIGI encourages paper submissions.
