= Gemeilia: Kokko & May =

1997 Malaysia comic series

哥妹俩
- Genre: Humor; Slice of life
- Author: Eddie See Yew Lee
- Publisher: (Malaysia) United Publishing House; Sasbadi (2018-present)
- Original run: 1997 – ongoing
- Volumes: Chinese monthly issues: More than 200; English double issues: 24; Comics Collection: 22
- Kokko & May: E-Learning; Mini Gemeilia

Ge Mei Lia (Chinese: 哥妹俩; pinyin: Gēmèiliǎ; lit. 'Older brother and younger sister'), translated in English as Kokko & May, is an ongoing Malaysian Chinese comic series created by Eddie See Yew Lee. The series began in 1997 and it is published by United Publishing House (M) Sdn. Bhd..

As it was regarded within the Malaysian comics industry as a health-oriented reading material for primary school students, the comic became highly popular in Malaysia and Singapore during its monthly publication, and was also sold in Mainland China, Taiwan, and Hong Kong, ultimately transforming the direction of Malaysian comics.

Kokko & May tells the daily life stories of siblings, Kokko See and May See. Apart from interacting with the See family members, classmates, teachers, and also one shot characters, inspiring children to encounter ups and downs and also learning cultural characteristics beyond school textbook teachings.

== Title inspiration ==
Kokko & May features a pair of male and female young siblings. The inspiration did not stem from Eddie See's own children, but rather from the concept of gender role balances. Since a mischievous young boy could lead to a wider variety of story developments, Eddie See chose the male character, Kokko See, as the primary lead of the narration. Initially, Eddie See intended to title the work “Xiong Mei Lia” (Chinese: 兄妹俩; trans. "older brother and younger sister"), however, the Chinese character “Xiong” (Chinese: 兄; trans. "brother") is also a homophone of “Xiong” (Chinese: 凶; trans. "fierce/violent"), which disrupted the tone and rhetorical effect of the title. In the end, "Ge Mei Lia" was decided, and later changed to Kokko & May, making the series more accessible and memorable for English readers.

== Characters ==
=== See family ===
Kokko See (Chinese: 徐果果)
The male protagonist of Kokko & May, born on 23 July, aged 11. His first name, Kokko, is a homophone of "older brother (Chinese: 哥哥)" in Malaysian Cantonese or Hokkien. Kokko has the personality of mischievousness, clever, humorous and eccentric. He is also a primary school student at Sekolah Jenis Kebangsaan (Cina) Nan Kai. He frequently teams up with his younger sister, May See, in their adventures. He particularly loves durians and bak kut teh. His medical conditions included spinal problems (due to spending excessive amounts of time on the computer), dengue fever and flat feet. He is also allergic to the smell of cockroaches, which causes him to sneeze uncontrollably whenever he detects their presence. Kokko's examination results are usually among the lowest in his class, and he frequently asks May to help him with his homework.

May See (Chinese: 徐美美)
The female protagonist of Kokko & May, aged 9. She is Kokko's only younger sister and attends Sekolah Jenis Kebangsaan (Cina) Nankai alongside him. She has a naive and innocent personality. In the earlier comic stories, she was not given an official name, and later was added by Eddie See based on the official poll results, a homophone of Mandarin Chinese "younger sister (Chinese: 妹妹)". Her academic performance has consistently been better than Kokko's.

Mr. See (Chinese: 徐阿树)
The father of the See family and younger brother of Howard See, aged 48. A caring father who always puts his family first, and also possesses some knowledge of diverse topics. He was once forced by his company's general manager to lay off employees. He later established the Kokko & May Hainanese Chicken Rice Shop with his wife. Mr. See once unknowingly developed heart disease and nearly lost his life due to his heavy intake of greasy food.

Mrs. See (Chinese: 雷玉苹)
The mother of the See family, older sister of Royces and the maternal grandaunt of Luke, aged 45. A full-time housewife with devoted and caring personality. Her modest clothing was once criticised in readers' letters. Despite her age, she maintains a lifelong learning attitude and takes up karate lessons, and even saved her family's lives during critical situations.

Royces (Chinese: 雷金水)
Kokko's physical education teacher, maternal uncle of Kokko and May, and also the younger brother of Mrs. See. He previously travelled to the United States for specialised training. Upon returning from China, he was once mistakenly suspected of being infected with avian influenza. He has romantic feelings for Jean.

Howard See (Chinese: 麥克•徐)
Paternal uncle of Kokko and May and the older brother of Mr. See. He has an eccentric personality and frequently moves house. He was previously a scientist specialising in genetic engineering in the United States. He chose to resign and to live in seclusion due to professional mistake. After Kokko's father was dismissed from his job, Howard decided to settle permanently in Malaysia and works in Kokko & May Hainanese Chicken Rice Shop.

Jean (Chinese: 珍紫)
A tenant of the See family. She was introduced when they decided to rent out a room to generate additional income. As her father runs a coffin shop in Johor, she was frequently teased by her childhood classmates as the "Coffin Girl". After listening to her father's explanation, she came to understand that there is no distinction of social status or dignity in the business of selling coffins. She has romantic feelings for Royces.

Luke (Chinese: 姜聪)
Cousin of Kokko and May. Although kind-hearted, he is rather impulsive. Initially going through a rebellious phase and eager to experience a new lifestyle, he moved into the See family's home and began helping out at the Kokko & May Hainanese Chicken Rice Shop.

Uncle Fish (Chinese: 陈鱼)
A tenant of the See family and has only one strand of hair on his head. He once saved Mr. See from danger in the past, making him a benefactor of the See family.

== History ==
=== Pioneering Period (1997–2007) ===
In 1997, leveraging the lack of children's comics in the Malaysian comic market, Eddie See Yew Lee launched Gemeilia's pilot volume (Chinese: 哥妹俩创刊号) as the debut of his professional career. The work was published by United Publishing House (M) Sdn. Bhd. (Chinese: 联营出版（马）有限公司), however, the pilot volume released that same year performed poorly, with about two to three thousand unsold copies remaining. Its 1999 sequel, The Mischievous Siblings (Chinese: 淘气哥妹俩), also received a lukewarm response, with its initial print of 5,000 copies taking about a year to sell out. The underwhelming sales were mainly due to the thick volume, black-and-white interior pages lacking visual appeal, and a high price point for the perceived quality.

Moreover, during the late 1990s and early 2000s, the Malaysian education system generally viewed comics as harmful materials, often associating them with violence or adult content, rendering them banned items in schools. It was not until 2002 that Eddie See, after receiving numerous feedback and suggestions from readers of the pilot and The Mischievous Siblings, decided to reorganize and republish these books through a subsidiary of United Publishing House, G. Apple Studio Sdn. Bhd. (Chinese: 青苹果工作室有限公司). The books were split into four small volumes; one shots, Struggles (Chinese: 奋斗), Guests at Home (Chinese: 家有稀客), and Siblings Affection (Chinese: 手足情深), to resolve the issue of them being out of print. Drawing inspiration from the Hong Kong children’s magazine The Children's Paradise (Chinese: 兒童樂園), Eddie See aimed to transition the series into a monthly publication suitable for school readership.

This transformation plan was initially met with skepticism from the publisher’s executives. Although it was originally intended to become a bimonthly magazine, Kokko & May was eventually published monthly from 2003. That same year, the first issue of the monthly series, titled Apprieciate What You Have (Chinese: 珍惜拥有), was released. Eddie See personally visited Chinese primary schools across Malaysia to promote the comic, leveraging the opportunity to bundle it with 20,000 copies of textbooks. The strategy proved effective, and within a few years, Kokko & May became increasingly popular among Chinese primary school students in Malaysia, Singapore, and Brunei.

=== Peak Period (2008–2015) ===
In 2009, Kokko & May achieved a monthly circulation of 150,000 copies. During the same year, a new spin-off magazine, Kokko & May: E-Learning (Chinese: 哥妹俩之e起学习), was launched, focusing on children’s science and technology education. It complemented the original comic’s emphasis on life education, thereby expanding the thematic scope of the brand. In September 2009, Eddie See established Ge Mei Art Studio (Chinese: 哥妹俩绘画创作室) to offer art courses for both children and adults.

By 2010, Kokko & May had influenced other Malaysian children's publications, with some segments featuring striking similarities to the original’s on-site visit format. Around the same time, the short animated series Kokko & May: Idiom Animation (Chinese: 哥妹俩动画成语) premiered on Astro’s educational program Xiao Tai Yang, marking the brand’s entry into animation.

In September 2011, due to health concerns, Eddie See announced in Kokko & May: I Am the Team Leader (Chinese: 哥妹俩之我是组长) that the 200th issue would be the final installment of the series’ regular publication. In 2012, he founded Pinko Creative Sdn. Bhd. (Chinese: 品口动漫有限公司), a subsidiary of United Publishing House, aimed at promoting high-quality Malaysian comics and nurturing local talent. The publication rights for Kokko & May were subsequently transferred to this new company. In the same year, a trilingual version (Chinese, English, and Malay) of Kokko & May was launched as an iOS app developed by HBL, marking its expansion into digital platforms.

In 2013, Malaysia’s first movie adapted from a comic, Gemeilia 2013 (Chinese: 哥妹俩之惊历48), starring William Yap and Loh Mingirl, was officially released. The following year, a new magazine titled Mini Gemeilia (Chinese: 迷你哥妹俩) was launched to provide children with a fairytale-themed platform for comic creation and publication.

=== Turbulent Period (2016–2018) ===
In 2016, Sasbadi Holdings Bhd. acquired United Publishing House (M) Sdn. Bhd. and its subsidiaries. By 2018, Pinko Creative faced constraints due to limited personal resources, reduced publishing and promotional capacity, and technical disputes with Sasbadi over publishing rights. Eddie See decided to let Sasbadi take over Pinko Creative under the name of United Publishing House (M) Sdn. Bhd. to effectively resolve issues related to the publication of Kokko & May.

The acquisition price was based on Pinko Creative’s 2016 profit and asset valuation (excluding royalty income from Kokko & May). The deal granted Sasbadi the publishing and distribution rights for the Kokko & May monthly series, while Eddie See retained the copyright to the work and the right to operate Ge Mei Art Studio.

=== Declining Period (2019–Present) ===
Due to the global COVID-19 pandemic, five planned issues of the Kokko & May monthly magazine, originally scheduled for release in the second half of 2021, were delayed to the first half of 2022. With the Malaysian Movement Control Order in effect, planned school visits and tourist site reporting were suspended, resulting in thinner magazine content.

In 2023, although Eddie See considered fast-tracking the series' finale, he ultimately decided against it, fearing that doing so would negatively impact the related industry chain. Instead, he shifted the magazine's release schedule to irregular publication and announced plans to implement a new publishing model within the next two to three years. Despite reaching its 200th issue milestone, Eddie See has yet to find the right inspiration to conclude the Kokko & May series.

== Media ==
=== Standalone books ===
No.	Title	Release date	ISBN
1	Gemeilia: The First Volume 哥妹俩创刊号	1997	—
2	The Mischievous Siblings 淘气哥妹俩	1999	—

=== Small volumes ===
No.	Title	Original release date	Malay release date
1	Ko.Mei: Komik Pendek 哥妹俩：单元漫画	2002; 978-983-2564-10-2	2002; 978-983-2564-44-7
2	Ko.Mei: Perjuangan 哥妹俩：奋斗	2002; 978-983-2564-11-9	2002; 978-983-2564-45-4
3	Ko.Mei: Tetamu yang Istimewa 哥妹俩：家有稀客	2002; 978-983-2564-12-6	2002; 978-983-2564-46-1
4	Ko.Mei: Air Dicencang Tidak Akan Putus 哥妹俩：手足情深	2002; 978-983-2564-13-3	2002; 978-983-2564-47-8

=== Chinese monthly issues ===
Kokko & May monthly issues are released exclusively in Chinese since 2003. As of 2023, more than 200 issues have been published.

=== English double issues ===
During late 2000s, the earliest edition of Kokko & May English version was released as double issues, with a total of 24 volumes published. It was later replaced by the Kokko & May Comics Collection.

No.	Title	Release date	ISBN
1	Kokko & May 1: Appreciate What You Have/Mum, You've Suffered	Undefined	978-983-3860-13-5
2	Kokko & May 2: Little Wild Owl/Lunch Box With Love	Undefined	978-983-3860-14-2
3	Kokko & May 3: Experience of Tooth Extraction/An Adventure in Room	Undefined	978-983-3860-15-9
4	Kokko & May 4: Competition	Undefined	978-983-3860-16-6
5	Kokko & May 5: Brother and Sister/The Perak Monk	Undefined	978-983-3860-17-3
6	Kokko & May 6: Fright on a Rainy Day/Helping is Good	Undefined	978-983-3860-18-0
7	Kokko & May 7: Missing Forever/Beware of Strangers	Undefined	978-983-3860-19-7
8	Kokko & May 8: Learning to Swim/Be Brave Enough to Make an Apology	Undefined	978-983-3860-20-3
9	Kokko & May 9: Dreamland	Undefined	978-983-3860-23-4
10	Kokko & May 10: Hebee and Kokko/Lifelong Learning	Undefined	978-983-3860-24-1
11	Kokko & May 11: Tsunami/Be a Role Model	Undefined	978-983-3860-25-8
12	Kokko & May 12: The Best Results/Garbage Collector	Undefined	978-983-3860-26-5
13	Kokko & May 13: My Teacher Miss Theresa/Scientist	Undefined	978-983-3860-02-9
14	Kokko & May 14: Fear of Ghost	Undefined	978-983-3860-03-6
15	Kokko & May 15: Positive Thinking/Room Rental	Undefined	978-983-3860-04-3
16	Kokko & May 16: The Hainan Chicken Rice Shop/She is My Mother	Undefined	978-983-3860-05-0
17	Kokko & May 17: He is My Father/The Influenza	Undefined	978-983-3860-27-2
18	Kokko & May 18: Homeless/Friendship	Undefined	978-983-3860-28-9
19	Kokko & May 19: Teardrops in Blue	Undefined	978-983-3860-29-6
20	Kokko & May 20: I am Rich/Teenage Rebel	Undefined	978-983-3860-30-2
21	Kokko & May 21: The Floods/Co-operation	Undefined	978-983-3860-63-0
22	Kokko & May 22: Spine Problems/Bomb Alert	Undefined	978-983-3860-64-7
23	Kokko & May 23: Greed/Hungry Ghost Festival	Undefined	978-983-3860-65-4
24	Kokko & May 24: Love and Education	Undefined	978-983-3860-66-1

=== Malay quadruple issues ===
The Malay version of Kokko & May was first published around early 2010s, with a total of 11 books released. Each book features four comic stories.

No.	Title	Release date	ISBN
1	Kokko dan May 1	Undefined	978-983-3860-45-6
1. "Hargai Apa Yang Kau Ada" (Chinese: 珍惜拥有; pinyin: Zhēnxī yōngyǒu); 2. "Pertandingan Badminton (bahagian 1)" (Chinese: 比赛·上; pinyin: Bǐsaì - shàng); 3. "Pertandingan Badminton (bahagian 2)" (Chinese: 比赛·下; pinyin: Bǐsaì - xià); 4. "Ibu, Anda Telah Merana" (Chinese: 妈妈辛苦了; pinyin: Māmā xīnkǔ le)
2	Kokko dan May 2	Undefined	978-983-3860-46-3
1. "Burung Hantu Nakal" (Chinese: 猫头鹰小野乌; pinyin: Maōtóuyīng Xiaǒyěwū); 2. "Bekalan Kasih Sayang" (Chinese: 爱心盒饭; pinyin: Aìxīn héfàn); 3. "Adik-Beradik" (Chinese: 姐弟俩; pinyin: Jiě dì liǎ); 4. "Orang Yang Baik Hati Suka Menolong" (Chinese: 救人为善; pinyin: Jiù rénwéi shàn)
3	Kokko dan May 3	Undefined	978-983-3860-47-0
1. "Pengalaman Mencabut Gigi" (Chinese: 拔牙记; pinyin: Bàyájì); 2. "Pengembaraan Di Dalam Bilik" (Chinese: 书房奇遇; pinyin: Shūfáng qíyù); 3. "Rinduan Yang Selama-lamanya" (Chinese: 永远的思念; pinyin: Yǒngyuǎn de sīniàn); 4. "Berwaspada Dengan Orang yang Tidak Dikenali" (Chinese: 提防陌生人; pinyin: Tífáng mòshēng rén)
4	Kokko dan May 4	Undefined	978-983-3860-48-7
1. "Sami Dari Perak" (Chinese: 霹雳小和尚; pinyin: Pīlì xiǎo héshàng); 2. "Kejutan Ketika Hari Hujan" (Chinese: 雨天惊魂; pinyin: Yǔtiān jīnghún); 3. "Belajar Berenang" (Chinese: 学游泳; pinyin: Xué yóuyǒng); 4. "Beranikan Diri Untuk Mengakui Salah" (Chinese: 勇于认错; pinyin: Yǒngyú rèncuò)
5	Kokko dan May 5	Undefined	978-983-3860-52-4
1. "Alam Mimpi (bahagian 1)" (Chinese: 梦幻世界·上; pinyin: Mènghuàn shìjiè - shàng); 2. "Alam Mimpi (bahagian 2)" (Chinese: 梦幻世界·下; pinyin: Mènghuàn shìjiè - xià); 3. "Hebee Dan Kokko" (Chinese: 班长与我; pinyin: Bānzhǎng yǔ wǒ); 4. "Pengajaran Sepanjang Hayat" (Chinese: 终身学习; pinyin: Zhōngshēn xuéxí)
6	Kokko dan May 6	Undefined	978-983-3860-53-1
1. "Tsunami" (Chinese: 海啸; pinyin: Hǎixiào); 2. "Jadilah Teladan" (Chinese: 以身作则; pinyin: Yǐshēnzuòzé); 3. "Keputusan Terbaik" (Chinese: 第1名; pinyin: Dì yī míng); 4. "Pengutip Sampah" (Chinese: 拾荒者; pinyin: Shíhuāng zhě)
7	Kokko dan May 7	Undefined	978-983-3860-81-4
1. "Cikguku, Cik Theresa" (Chinese: 我们的老师; pinyin: Wǒmen de lǎoshī); 2. "Saintis" (Chinese: 发明家; pinyin: Fāmíng jiā); 3. "Takut Akan Hantu (bahagian 1)" (Chinese: 怕鬼·上; pinyin: Pà guǐ - shàng); 4. "Takut Akan Hantu (bahagian 2)" (Chinese: 怕鬼·下; pinyin: Pà guǐ - xià)
8	Kokko dan May 8	Undefined	978-983-3860-82-1
1. "Hidup Positif" (Chinese: 积极人生; pinyin: Jījí rénshēng); 2. "Bilik Sewa" (Chinese: 有房出租; pinyin: Yǒu fáng chūzū); 3. "Kedai Nasi Ayam Hainan" (Chinese: 海南鸡饭; pinyin: Hǎinán jī fàn); 4. "Dialah Ibuku" (Chinese: 她不丑，她是我妈妈; pinyin: Tā bù chǒu, tā shì wǒ māmā)
9	Kokko dan May 9	Undefined	978-967-0659-09-1
1. "Dialah Ayahku" (Chinese: 他不胖，他是我爸爸; pinyin: Tā bù pàng, tā shì wǒ bàba); 2. "Influenza" (Chinese: 禽流感; pinyin: Qín liúgǎn); 3. "Tempat Perlindungan" (Chinese: 家园; pinyin: Jiāyuán); 4. "Tidak Membezakan Kawan" (Chinese: 善待朋友; pinyin: Shàndài péngyǒu)
10	Kokko dan May 10	Undefined	978-967-0745-56-5
1. "Air Mata Biru (bahagian 1)" (Chinese: 蓝眼泪·上; pinyin: Lán yǎnlèi - shàng); 2. "Air Mata Biru (bahagian 2)" (Chinese: 蓝眼泪·下; pinyin: Lán yǎnlèi - xià); 3. "Kami Orang Berduit" (Chinese: 老子有钱; pinyin: Lǎozǐ yǒu qián); 4. "Jiwa Yang Berontak" (Chinese: 叛逆岁月; pinyin: Pànnì suìyuè)
11	Kokko dan May 11	Undefined	978-967-0745-68-8
1. "Banjir Besar" (Chinese: 大水灾; pinyin: Dà shuǐzāi); 2. "Kerjasama" (Chinese: 合作精神; pinyin: Hézuò jīngshén); 3. "Masalah Tulang Belakang" (Chinese: 脊椎骨; pinyin: Jǐzhuīgǔ); 4. "Pembunuh Senyap" (Chinese: 定时炸弹; pinyin: Dìngshí zhàdàn)

=== Comics Collection issues ===
The monthly issues are compiled in Comics Collections (Chinese: 漫画故事; pinyin: Mànhuà gùshì) corresponding to each year of release starting from 2007, followed by their English releases in 2012.

No.	Title	Original release date	English release date
1	Comics Collection 1 漫画故事／漫画故事1	2007; 978-983-3860-21-0	2012; 978-967-0659-11-4
1. "Appreciate What You Have" (Chinese: 珍惜拥有; pinyin: Zhēnxī yōngyǒu); 2. "Little Wild Owl" (Chinese: 猫头鹰小野乌; pinyin: Maōtóuyīng Xiaǒyěwū; trans. "Wooley, the Owl"); 3. "Lunch Box with Love" (Chinese: 爱心盒饭; pinyin: Aìxīn héfàn); 4. "Experience of Tooth Extraction" (Chinese: 拔牙记; pinyin: Bàyájì); 5. "An Adventure in Room" (Chinese: 书房奇遇; pinyin: Shūfáng qíyù); 6. "Competition (part 1)" (Chinese: 比赛·上; pinyin: Bǐsaì - shàng); 7. "Competition (part 2)" (Chinese: 比赛·下; pinyin: Bǐsaì - xià); 8. "Mum, You Have Suffered" (Chinese: 妈妈辛苦了; pinyin: Māmā xīnkǔ le)
2	Comics Collection 2 漫画故事2	2008; 978-983-2564-78-2	2012; 978-967-0659-14-5
1. "Sister and Brother" (Chinese: 姐弟俩; pinyin: Jiě dì liǎ); 2. "The Perak Monk" (Chinese: 霹雳小和尚; pinyin: Pīlì xiǎo héshàng); 3. "Fright on a Rainy Day" (Chinese: 雨天惊魂; pinyin: Yǔtiān jīnghún); 4. "Helping Is Good" (Chinese: 救人为善; pinyin: Jiù rén wéi shàn); 5. "Missing Forever" (Chinese: 永远的思念; pinyin: Yǒngyuǎn de sīniàn); 6. "Beware of Strangers" (Chinese: 提防陌生人; pinyin: Tífáng mòshēngrén; trans. "Preventing Strangers"); 7. "Learn to Swim" (Chinese: 学游泳; pinyin: Xué yóuyǒng); 8. "Be Brave Enough to Make an Apology" (Chinese: 勇于认错; pinyin: Yǒngyú rèncuò; trans. "Bravely Admit One's Mistakes"); 9. "Hebee & Kokko" (Chinese: 班长与我; pinyin: Bānzhǎng yǔ wǒ; trans. "The Class Monitor & I")
3	Comics Collection 3 漫画故事3	2009; 978-983-2564-82-9	2012; 978-967-0659-06-0
1. "Dreamland (part 1)" (Chinese: 梦幻世界·上; pinyin: Mènghuàn shìjiè - shàng); 2. "Dreamland (part 2)" (Chinese: 梦幻世界·下; pinyin: Mènghuàn shìjiè - xià); 3. "Lifelong Learning" (Chinese: 终身学习; pinyin: Zhōngshēn xuéxí); 4. "Tsunami" (Chinese: 海啸; pinyin: Hǎixiào); 5. "Be a Role Model" (Chinese: 以身作则; pinyin: Yǐshēnzuòzé); 6. "The Best Result" (Chinese: 第1名; pinyin: Dì yī míng; trans. "The First Place"); 7. "Garbage Collector" (Chinese: 拾荒者; pinyin: Shíhuāng zhě); 8. "My Teacher Miss Theresa" (Chinese: 我们的老师; pinyin: Wǒmen de lǎoshī; trans. "Our Teacher"); 9. "Scientist" (Chinese: 发明家; pinyin: Fāmíngjiā; trans. "Inventor")
4	Comics Collection 4 漫画故事4	2010; 978-983-2564-91-1	2012; 978-983-3860-58-6
1. "Fear Of Ghost (part 1)" (Chinese: 怕鬼·上; pinyin: Pà guǐ - shàng); 2. "Fear Of Ghost (part 2)" (Chinese: 怕鬼·下; pinyin: Pà guǐ - xià); 3. "Positive Thinking" (Chinese: 积极人生; pinyin: Jījí rénshēng; trans. "Positive Life"); 4. "Room Rental" (Chinese: 有房出租; pinyin: Yǒu fáng chūzū); 5. "The Hainan Chicken Rice Shop" (Chinese: 海南鸡饭; pinyin: Hǎinán jīfàn; trans. "Hainanese Chicken Rice"); 6. "She is My Mother" (Chinese: 他不丑他是我妈妈; pinyin: Tā bù chǒu tā shì wǒ māmā; trans. "She's Not Ugly, She Is My Mother"); 7. "He is My Father" (Chinese: 他不胖他是我爸爸; pinyin: Tā bú pàng tā shì wǒ bàbà; trans. "He's Not Fat, He Is My Father"); 8. "The Influenza" (Chinese: 禽流感; pinyin: Qínliúgǎn); 9. "Homeless" (Chinese: 家园; pinyin: Jiāyuán; trans. "Home")
5	Comics Collection 5 漫画故事5	2011; 978-983-3860-06-7	August 2012; 978-967-0659-07-7
1. "Friendship" (Chinese: 善待朋友; pinyin: Shàndài péngyǒu; trans. "Treat Friends Well"); 2. "Teardrops in Blue (part 1)" (Chinese: 蓝眼泪·上; pinyin: Lán yǎnlèi - shàng); 3. "Teardrops in Blue (part 2)" (Chinese: 蓝眼泪·下; pinyin: Lán yǎnlèi - xià); 4. "I Am Rich" (Chinese: 老子有钱; pinyin: Lǎozǐ yǒu qián); 5. "Teenage Rebel" (Chinese: 叛逆岁月; pinyin: Pànnì suìyuè; trans. "Rebellious Years"); 6. "The Floods" (Chinese: 大水灾; pinyin: Dà shuǐzāi; trans. "The Great Flood"); 7. "Co-operation" (Chinese: 合作精神; pinyin: Hézuò jīngshén; trans. "Teamwork"); 8. "Spine Problems" (Chinese: 脊椎骨; pinyin: Jǐzhuīgǔ; trans. "The Spine"); 9. "Bomb Alert" (Chinese: 定时炸弹; pinyin: Dìngshí zhàdàn; trans. "Time Bomb")
6	Comics Collection 6 漫画故事6	2012; 978-983-3860-56-2	2013; 978-967-0659-12-1
1. "Greed"; 2. "Hungry Ghost Festival"; 3. "Love and Education (part 1)"; 4. "Love and Education (part 2)"; 5. "Proper Use of Serving Utensils"; 6. "Doggy's Story"; 7. "Egg in the Slingsax Bag"; 8. "War"; 9. "Because I Love You"
7	Comics Collection 7 漫画故事7	August 2012; 978-983-3860-73-9	July 2014; 978-967-0659-02-2
1. "Bak Kut Teh"; 2. "Many Hands Make Light Work"; 3. "Make A Wish"; 4. "Fearless in the Face of Danger (part 1)"; 5. "Fearless in the Face of Danger (part 2)"; 6. "Thanks, Parents!"; 7. "KAKAK in the House"; 8. "The Joy of Contentment"; 9. "Aedes"
8	Comics Collection 8 漫画故事8	July 2013; 978-983-3860-94-4	December 2015; 978-967-0745-15-2
1. "Listen to Mummy"; 2. "Beware of Sugar Daddy"; 3. "Restart"; 4. "Give Me Five"; 5. "We are Happy Family"; 6. "Alien"; 7. "100% Pampered"; 8. "Uncle Tarzan"; 9. "Earthquake"
9	Comics Collection 9 漫画故事9	October 2013; 978-983-3860-99-9	April 2017; 978-967-0745-44-2
1. "Respecting Teachers"; 2. "Mistake"; 3. "Hometown"; 4. "Mummy, Help Me!"; 5. "Happy Father's Day"; 6. "Movie Watching"; 7. "Little Turtle"; 8. "2011"; 9. "The Best Buddy"
10	Comics Collection 10 漫画故事10	June 2014; 978-967-0659-04-6	November 2018; 978-967-0745-61-9
1. "Father and Son"; 2. "Social Media"; 3. "Kindness Begets Kindness"; 4. "Bomb Alert Episode 2"; 5. "See You Again!"; 6. "Technology and Humanity"; 7. "I am the Team Leader"; 8. "The Frightful Two Hours"; 9. "The Old is Better Than the New"
11	Comics Collection 11 漫画故事11	June 2015; 978-967-0745-16-9	October 2019; 978-967-0745-76-3
1. "Meeting Online Friends"; 2. "Lets Eat!"; 3. "Life Saviour"; 4. "It is More Blessed to Give"; 5. "Farewell, My Concubine"; 6. "Control Your Temper"; 7. "The World of Newspapers"; 8. "A Little Something for You (part 1)"; 9. "A Little Something for You (part 2)"
12	Comics Collection 12 漫画故事12	October 2016; 978-967-0745-35-0	June 2020; 978-967-0745-87-9
1. "Proud of You"; 2. "Develop Your Potential"; 3. "Good Morning, Students!"; 4. "Rag Doll"; 5. "Indecisiveness"; 6. "Mother's Day Gift"; 7. "Fire"; 8. "Chinese New Year (part 1)"; 9. "Chinese New Year (part 2)"
13	Comics Collection 13 漫画故事13	June 2017; 978-967-0745-46-6	April 2021; 978-967-2826-03-3
1. "Say Nice Things to Others"; 2. "Chicken Tail Rice"; 3. "Dengue"; 4. "Clean Plate Campaign"; 5. "The Crisis of Rats"; 6. "Sneezing"; 7. "Exercise Book"; 8. "I Love Ice Cream"; 9. "Looking at Facial Expressions"
14	Comics Collection 14 漫画故事14	June 2018; 978-967-0745-55-8	May 2022; 978-967-2826-15-6
1. "Let's Go Cycling (part 1)"; 2. "Let's Go Cycling (part 2)"; 3. "Return Good For Evil"; 4. "Reunion Dinner"; 5. "Fireflies Fly Again"; 6. "Visiting A Friend"; 7. "Speak Out Your Love"; 8. "Sucking a Milk Bottle"; 9. "Once Upon a Time, There Was a Mountain"
15	Comics Collection 15 漫画故事15	June 2019; 978-967-0745-69-5	April 2023; 978-967-2826-25-5
1. "Carelessness"; 2. "The Story of Traffic Lights"; 3. "Goodwill Week"; 4. "Spring Cleaning"; 5. "Birthday Surprise"; 6. "Smart Animals"; 7. "Holiday Homework"; 8. "New Dream"; 9. "King of Lateness"
16	Comics Collection 16 漫画故事16	August 2019; 978-967-0745-77-0	July 2023; 978-967-2826-36-1
1. "Charity Bazaar"; 2. "Mid-Autumn Festival"; 3. "School Holiday (part 1)"; 4. "School Holiday (part 2)"; 5. "Cheating"; 6. "Bedtime Story"; 7. "May Getting Makeup"; 8. "As Long as It is Enough"; 9. "Little Doll"
17	Comics Collection 17 漫画故事17	March 2020; 978-967-0745-79-4	October 2023; 978-967-2826-40-8
1. "Roly-Poly"; 2. "Learn to Forgive Others"; 3. "Fighting Fish"; 4. "Don’t Complain"; 5. "I Am A Hyperactive Child"; 6. "Cutie Is Missing"; 7. "Priority Seats"; 8. "Family Photo"; 9. "Let’s Go Shopping"
18	Comics Collection 18 漫画故事18	July 2020; 978-967-0745-91-6	January 2024; 978-967-2826-53-8
1. "Stay Calm, Don’t Panic"; 2. "Learning Knows No Limits"; 3. "A Little Story of the Bookstore"; 4. "Flash Flood"; 5. "Dreamland 2.0 (part 1)"; 6. "Dreamland 2.0 (part 2)"; 7. "Stealing"; 8. "Eating Eggs"
19	Comics Collection 19 漫画故事19	February 2021; 978-967-0745-96-1	October 2024; 978-967-2826-74-3
1. "Little Kitty"; 2. "Haircut"; 3. "Going Outdoors"; 4. "Relocation (part 1)"; 5. "Relocation (part 2)"; 6. "First Aid & CPR"; 7. "The Uninvited Guest"
20	Comics Collection 20 漫画故事20	March 2022; 978-967-2826-11-8	March 2025; 978-967-2826-91-0
1. "Self-Discipline"; 2. "Let the Sunflower Bloom"; 3. "I Love the Sea"; 4. "Body Odour and Stinky Fart"; 5. "Millipede"; 6. "Final Farewell"; 7. "Movement Control Order (MCO)"
21	Comics Collection 21 漫画故事21	March 2023; 978-967-2826-20-0	March 2026; 978-629-7787-47-3
1. "Transfer Student"; 2. "Blood Donation"; 3. "Online Classes"; 4. "Here Comes Dudu"; 5. "Outdoor Sketching"; 6. "New and Old Clothes"; 7. "I Think I Caught a Cold"
22	Comics Collection 22 漫画故事22	February 2024; 978-967-2826-54-5	September 2026; 978-629-7787-63-3
1. "Returning Lost Money"; 2. "Let's All Do Our Best!"; 3. "I'm Not Afraid of Injections"; 4. "Freedom"; 5. "Home Is a Child's Safe Haven"; 6. "Invasion (1)"; 7. "Invasion (2)"
23	Comics Collection 23 漫画故事23	January 2025; 978-967-2826-83-5	TBA
24	Comics Collection 24 漫画故事24	January 2026; 978-629-7787-43-5	TBA

=== 20th Anniversary Special Edition ===
No.	Title	Original release date	English release date
1	Do You Know? 你知不知道？	November 2017; 978-967-0745-52-7	July 2020; 978-967-0745-92-3
2	What Would You Do? 你会怎么做？	June 2019; 978-967-0745-70-1	October 2021; 978-967-2826-05-7
3	Do You Understand? 你懂了吗？	April 2021; 978-967-0745-99-2	None

=== Exploring the Amazing World ===
No.	Title	Original release date	English release date
1	Why Can Parrots Talk? 为什么鹦鹉会学人说话？	April 2022; 978-967-2826-10-1	January 2025; 978-967-2826-82-8
2	Why Does Rice Gets Bugs? 为什么大米会生虫？	July 2022; 978-967-2826-14-9	June 2025; 978-629-7787-15-2
3	Why Can't You Pick Your Nose? 为什么不能挖鼻孔？	September 2022; 978-967-2826-17-0	May 2026; 978-629-7787-61-9

== External link ==
- Gemeilia: Kokko & May official website
