= William Yap =

Malaysian singer and actor (2001–2025)

- Born: Yap Tze Cheng; 3 July 2001; Shah Alam, Selangor, Malaysia
- Died: 8 December 2025 (aged 24); Shah Alam, Selangor, Malaysia
- Occupations: Singer, actor
- Years active: 2012–2016

Yap Tze Cheng
- Traditional Chinese: 葉子城
- Simplified Chinese: 叶子城
Transcriptions
Standard Mandarin
- Hanyu Pinyin: Yè Zǐchéng

William Yap Tze Cheng (3 July 2001 – 8 December 2025), better known by his stage name William Yap, was a Malaysian singer and actor.

== Life and career ==
William Yap Tze Cheng was born in Shah Alam, Selangor, Malaysia on 3 July 2001. He enjoyed singing from childhood, and later participated in many singing and dancing competitions. In 2012, he auditioned for the movie Gemeilia 2013 (哥妹俩之惊历48) and played the lead role of Kokko See. In June 2013, Tze Cheng went to Muar with big-name singers like Alan Ko and other artists to film The Great Lion Kun Seng Keng (大舞狮 关圣宫). In August 2013, he signed a five-year contract with SKT Media & Entertainment Group (松江传媒文化集团). He acted in the 2015 film The Kid from the Big Apple.

Tze Cheng died on 8 December 2025, at the age of 24, after an illness.
