= Kwan Sai Hung =

Fictional martial artist

Kwan Sai Hung (also known as Guan Shihong) is a martial artist, and the subject of Deng Ming-Dao's Chronicles of Tao books. Born in 1920, Kwan is a Taoist Monk from the Zheng Yi sect of Taoism from the Huashan monastery. He is also a martial arts master.

== Biography ==
Kwan was born in 1920. His grandparents were Taoism adherents who practiced martial arts, and he came from an aristocratic family background, His father was a general, and his grandfather was a mandarin. When Kwan was nine years old, his grandfather arranged for him to go up Mount Hua to receive training in old Taoist traditions, including martial arts, medicine, herbal medicine, and inner alchemy. Kwan was the Grand Master of Huashan's 13th and final disciple. Following two years of guerrilla warfare during the Second Sino-Japanese War, Kwan went back to the mountain. Once he had completed the process of becoming an adept, he entered the political space. Kwan became an undersecretary for Zhou Enlai. While Maoists were engaging in purges and dismantling the traditional cultural practices of China, Kwan moved to the United States in the middle of the 1960s. In the early 1990s, he was the sole overseas representative of the Zhengyi-Huashan Taoist sect.

Starting in 1981, he taught Deng Ming-Dao for 13 years. Deng wrote two books about him in the Chronicles of Tao series: The Wandering Taoist and Seven Bamboo Tablets of the Cloudy Satchel (1987). For The Wandering Taoist, Kwan created artwork depicting himself when he was 16 years old, his fellow students, and the Taoist masters the Grand Master, the Frog Immortal, and the Bat Immortal.

By 1987, Kwan was a resident of the San Francisco Bay Area. Kwan was 103 years old in 2024 and was teaching qi gong courses.
