= Deng Ken =

Chinese politician (1911–2017)

- 邓垦

Vice Governor of Hubei
- In office December 1981 – November 1982

Party Secretary of Wuhan
- In office March 1979 – December 1981

Chairman of the Wuhan Municipal Committee of the Chinese People's Political Consultative Conference
- In office March 1979 – December 1981

Personal details
- Born: Deng Xianxiu (邓先修); November 1911 Guang'an, Sichuan, Qing China
- Died: 15 October 2017 (aged 105) Shenzhen, Guangdong, China
- Party: Chinese Communist Party
- Relatives: Deng Xiaoping (brother); Deng Shuping (brother)

Deng Ken (Chinese: 邓垦; pinyin: Dèng Kěn; November 1911 – 15 October 2017) was a Chinese politician who served as Vice Governor of Hubei. During a political career spanning more than five decades, he held a number of senior Party and government positions. A member of the Chinese Communist Party from 1937, Deng participated in the Communist movement before the establishment of the People's Republic of China, working in Shanghai, Yan'an and Northeast China during the Second Sino-Japanese War and the Chinese Civil War. He was the younger brother of former Chinese paramount leader Deng Xiaoping and although their careers occasionally intersected, he spent most of his political life serving in regional administrative roles rather than in the central government.

== Early life ==
Originally named Deng Xianxiu, Deng was born in Guang'an, Sichuan, in November 1911, to Deng Wenming and a mother surnamed Dan. In 1920, his elder brother, Deng Xiaoping, left China to participate in the Diligent Work–Frugal Study Movement in France. While abroad, Deng Xiaoping sent political publications, including Chiguang ("Red Light"), to Sichuan. Deng Ken later recalled that reading these magazines during his school years had a lasting influence on his political outlook. As a student at Guang'an Junior Middle School and later Jialing High School in Nanchong, Deng participated in student protests against the Nationalist government. His political activities forced him to interrupt his studies on several occasions, during which he returned to his hometown to teach at Beishan Primary School, a school co-founded by his father. After continuing his education in Chengdu, he again became involved in revolutionary activities before deciding to pursue further studies in Shanghai in 1931. Before his departure, his father encouraged him to look for Deng Xiaoping, who was believed to be carrying out underground Communist work in the city following his return from abroad.

In April 1931, Deng enrolled at Jinan University in Shanghai. Unable to locate his brother through personal contacts, he published a notice in the Shishi Xinbao ("Current Affairs Daily") on 3 May requesting to find him. Because of his clandestine work for the Chinese Communist Party, Deng Xiaoping initially suspected the notice might be a trap by Nationalist Chinese intelligence agents and only established contact after verifying its authenticity through Party channels. The brothers eventually met secretly in a Shanghai teahouse. Deng Xiaoping advised his younger brother on security precautions and arranged a secure means of communication before leaving for the Jiangxi Soviet later that year. He also encouraged Deng to gain experience through the Red Aid Society, an organisation that assisted imprisoned Communist Party members and their families. Deng subsequently joined the organisation. After Deng Xiaoping departed for Jiangxi Soviet, the brothers again lost contact during the early years of the Long March.

== Political career ==
After studying at Jinan University and Shanghai University of Political Science and Law without completing his degrees, Deng became a teacher at Huiping Middle School in Shanghai. He joined the Communist Youth League of China in September 1935 and the Chinese Communist Party in May 1937. Between 1937 and 1938, he worked for the Relief Committee attached to the Eighth Route Army Office in Shanghai, where he maintained contact with imprisoned Party members and assisted those released from prison. In 1940, Deng moved to Yan'an Soviet, where he worked in the library of the Anti-Japanese Military and Political University before becoming an editor of the Liberation Daily. After the end of the Second Sino-Japanese War, he held a succession of Party and government posts in Northeast China, serving in the publicity departments of Jilin, as magistrate of Boli County, and later as mayor and Communist Party Secretary of Jiamusi. In July 1945, while Deng Xiaoping attended the First Plenary Session of the Seventh Central Committee of the Chinese Communist Party in Yan'an, the brothers briefly reunited.

Following the establishment of the People's Republic of China in 1949, Deng held senior administrative posts in Sichuan and Hubei, including Commissioner of the Luzhou Administrative Office, Party Secretary and Director of the Chongqing Municipal Education Bureau, Vice Mayor of Chongqing, and Vice Mayor of Wuhan. During the Cultural Revolution and following the political purge of Deng Xiaoping in 1966, he was removed from office and sent to perform manual labour at a May Seventh Cadre School.

Following Deng Xiaoping's rehabilitation in 1973, Deng Ken was also restored to public office. During the following decade, he served as Director of the Office of Culture and Education of the Wuhan Revolutionary Committee, Deputy Director of the Wuhan Revolutionary Committee, Deputy Secretary of the Wuhan Municipal Committee of the Chinese Communist Party, Vice Mayor of Wuhan, Party Secretary of Wuhan, and Chairman of the Wuhan Municipal Committee of the Chinese People's Political Consultative Conference. In December 1981, he was appointed Vice Governor of Hubei. After leaving that post in 1982, he served as counsellor to the People's Government of Hubei, a member of the Advisory Commission of the Hubei Provincial Committee of the Chinese Communist Party and President of the Hubei People's Association for Friendship with Foreign Countries before retiring from public office in December 1986.

== Personal and later life ==
Deng and his wife Ding Hua had a son, Deng Ye, who worked as a researcher at the Institute of Modern History of the Chinese Academy of Social Sciences.

In 2005, on the 100th birth anniversary of Deng Xiaoping, Deng Ken visited his hometown of Guang'an. Upon entering the Deng family's ancestral residence, he remarked, "[Deng] Xiaoping devoted his entire life to the revolution and never returned home."

In August 2015, with the approval of the central authorities, Deng was granted provincial governor-level treatment, an honorary administrative rank accorded to certain retired senior officials.

Deng died in Shenzhen on 15 October 2017 after an illness, aged 105. (Note: Following the Chinese way of counting, his age is often given as 106.) In accordance with his wishes and those of his family, no public memorial or funeral was held. His remains were cremated and his ashes were scattered at sea near Shenzhen.
