= Deng Yuezhang =

Cantopop Singer

Deng Yuezhang 邓岳章
- Born: June 5, 1997 (age 28); Heng County, Guangxi, China
- Origin: Guangdong, China
- Genres: Cantopop
- Occupations: Singer, music producer
- Years active: 2013–present
- Label: Xiutan Culture

Deng Yuezhang (simplified Chinese: 邓岳章; traditional Chinese: 鄧岳章, born 1997) is a cantopop singer-songwriter and music producer in China. He is the founder of Guangzhou Xiutan Arts, and a graduate of the Vocal Department at Guangdong Dance and Drama College.

His works exhibit a Hong Kong City pop style, characterized by melancholic melodies. With millions of views on Douyin, his notable songs include "Devil Encounter" (魔鬼邂逅), and "Not a Lover" (不做情人).

== Career ==
In 2016, he participated in The Voice of China and won the Nanning regional championship.

In 2017, he appeared as a guest at the Miss Asia Final. In the same year, he won the championship of the 6th Xiqiao Singing Competition.

In 2018, he once again won the Nanning regional championship in Sing! China and was awarded the global runner-up in Sing Cantonese (粤语好声音).
