= Deng Shuping =

Chinese politician (1913–1967)

- 邓蜀平
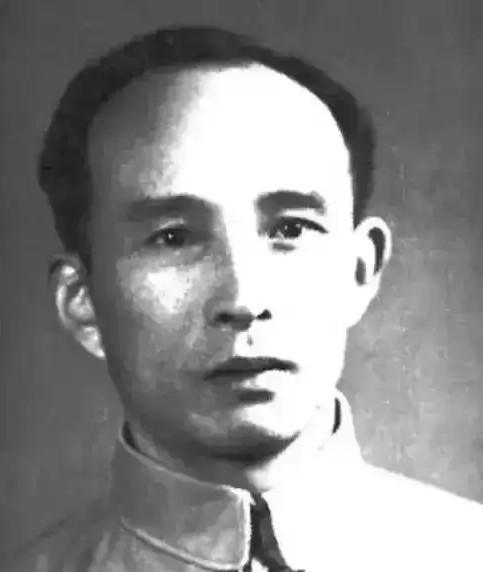

Deputy Mayor of Liuzhi
- In office 1960–1966

Personal details
- Born: Deng Xianzheng (邓先治); November 1913 Guang'an, Sichuan, Republic of China
- Died: 16 March 1967 (aged 53) Anshun, Guizhou, China
- Relatives: Deng Xiaoping (brother); Deng Ken (brother)

Deng Shuping (Chinese: 邓蜀平; pinyin: Dèng Shǔpíng; November 1913 – 16 March 1967) was a Chinese politician and the younger brother of Deng Xiaoping. He served in various local government positions in Guizhou. He committed suicide in 1967 during the Cultural Revolution and was posthumously rehabilitated in 1978.

== Early life ==
Originally named Deng Xianzheng, Deng was born in Guang'an, Sichuan, in November 1913, to Deng Wenming and a mother surnamed Dan. He was the younger brother of Deng Xiaoping and Deng Ken. Deng Shuping worked as a landlord and leader of a secret society before the formation of the People's Republic of China.

== Political career ==
Before 1949, Deng Shuping served as the speaker of the Kuomintang Senate in Guang'an County and was involved in managing his family's property. Following the proclamation of the People's Republic of China, he was encouraged by Deng Xiaoping to give up opium and undertake political study. During the Land Reform Movement in the 1950s, he was targeted as a landlord. Deng Xiaoping brought him and other relatives to Chongqing, where they stayed under the protection of the Southwest Military Administration, shielding them from local persecution. He was subsequently classified as an "enlightened landlord" as he did not extort rent, lend money at usurious rates, or commit murder and robbery.

In May 1950, Deng Shuping and his wife Xie Quanbi were admitted to the Southwest People's Revolutionary University. After completing his studies, he was assigned to work in Guizhou, where he held several local government positions. These included mayor of Qingshan Town in Pu'an County in Xingren Prefecture, deputy head of the county finance section and director of the Anshun County Finance Bureau. He also served as a member of the Guizhou Provincial Committee of the Chinese People's Political Consultative Conference. In February 1960, the government of Langdai County was relocated from Langdai town to Xiayunpan town. In May, the State Council approved the abolition of Langdai County and the establishment of Liuzhi, a county-level city. Deng Shuping and his wife were transferred to Liuzhi in December.

In December 1960, Deng was elected deputy mayor of Liuzhi. In October 1962, Liuzhi was abolished and replaced by Liuzhi County, and Deng became deputy county magistrate. When Liuzhi County was reorganised as Langdai County in February 1966, he continued to serve as deputy county magistrate. In November 1965, Deng Xiaoping and other central government leaders visited the Southwest Coal Mine Construction Headquarters in Liuzhi. During the visit, Deng Xiaoping met Deng Shuping and his wife aboard a train, where the visiting officials stayed because of the poor accommodation conditions in the mining area. This was reportedly the last meeting between the two brothers.

== Cultural Revolution and death ==
On the eve of the Cultural Revolution, Deng Shuping was transferred to Nanming District in Guiyang as deputy district head. However, before he even took office, Deng Xiaoping had already been purged from the Chinese Communist Party as the "second-largest capitalist roader". Upon receiving the news, Deng Shuping was then dismissed from his post and forced to appear in public every day for struggle sessions. On the night of 15 March 1967, a group associated with the so-called "Central Liu-Deng Crimes Joint Investigation Group" arrived in Liuzhi and, together with local rebel-group leaders, subjected Deng Shuping to a political struggle session. According to later accounts, the investigators sought information that could be used against Deng Xiaoping. Deng Shuping rejected accusations against his brother and disputed the charges made against himself.

In the early hours of 16 March 1967, unable to deal with severe persecution and harassment, Deng Shuping committed suicide by jumping into Maoshui Pool near Huangguoshu Waterfall in Anshun. The following day, officials reportedly found a handwritten testament in the final pages of a diary. It described aspects of his personal history and correspondence with Deng Xiaoping, Deng Ken and Zhuo Lin, and expressed his belief that he was unjustly accused.

After the Cultural Revolution, Deng Shuping was formally rehabilitated on 5 September 1978. His grave was repaired in 1981. In 1984, following a plea from Xie Quanbi, a new investigation was subsequently carried out and it confirmed Deng was persecuted to death. Those responsible were later disciplined. In October 1986, local officials arranged for his grave to be relocated and rebuilt. The new tomb was completed in Liuzhi, and a ceremony was held on 23 October 1987, attended by local officials and Deng's relatives.
