= Deng Ming-Dao =

Chinese American author, artist

Deng Ming-Dao (born 1954, San Francisco) is a Chinese American author, artist, philosopher, teacher and martial artist. Deng is his family name; Ming-Dao is his given name. From a young age, he studied Taoist internal arts such as Qigong and Kung-Fu.

He is the author of 365 Tao, Everyday Tao, Scholar Warrior, and Chronicles of Tao. His books have been translated into fifteen languages. "He studied qigong, philosophy, meditation, and internal martial arts with Taoist master Kwan Saihung for thirteen years, and studied with two other masters before that." He is a "graphic designer and fine artist whose work is in several collections, including those of the Brooklyn Museum."

== Publications ==
- The wandering Taoist. Harper & Row; 1983. ISBN 978-0-06-250225-4. Harpercollins Paperback; 1986. ISBN 978-0-06-250226-1.
- Seven bamboo tablets of the cloudy satchel. Harper & Row; 1987. ISBN 978-0-06-250227-8. Harpercollins Paperback 1988. ISBN 978-0-06-250229-2.
- Gateway to a Vast World. Harpercollins; 1989. ISBN 978-0-06-250230-8.
- Scholar Warrior: An Introduction to the Tao in Everyday Life. HarperOne; 1990. ISBN 978-0-06-250232-2.
- 365 Tao: Daily Meditations. HarperSanFrancisco; 1992. ISBN 978-0-06-250223-0.
- Chronicles of Tao: The Secret Life of a Taoist Master. HarperOne; 1993. ISBN 978-0-06-250219-3.
- Everyday Tao: Living with Balance and Harmony. HarperOne; 1996. ISBN 978-0-06-251395-3.
- Zen: The Art of Modern Eastern Cooking. Pavilion Books; 2001. ISBN 978-1-86205-346-5.
- Le Tao au jour le jour : 365 méditations taoïstes. Albin Michel, Paris, Fr. 2002. ISBN 978-2-226-13086-0.
- The Living I Ching: Using Ancient Chinese Wisdom to Shape Your Life. HarperOne; 2006. ISBN 978-0-06-085002-9.
- The Lunar Tao: Meditations in Harmony with the Seasons. HarperOne; 2013. ISBN 0062116886 & ISBN 978-0062116888.
- The Wisdom of the Tao: Ancient Stories That Delight, Inform, and Inspire. Hampton Roads; 2018. ISBN 1571748377 & ISBN 978-1571748379.

== See also ==
- Taoism
- Taoist meditation
