= Deng Zhuodi =

Chinese politician

Deng Zhuodi 邓卓棣

Deputy Secretary of the Communist Party of Pingguo County
- In office 2016–2017

Secretary of the party committee of Xin'an town in Pingguo County
- In office 2014–2016

Personal details
- Born: 17 October 1986 (age 39) United States
- Relations: Deng Xiaoping (grandfather); Zhuo Lin (grandmother)
- Relatives: Deng family
- Education: Beijing Jingshan School
- Alma mater: Peking University Law School; Duke University School of Law
- Occupation: Politician

Deng Zhuodi (Chinese: 邓卓棣; pinyin: Dèng Zhuódì; born 17 October 1986) is a Chinese former politician and grandson of former paramount leader of China Deng Xiaoping.

== Early life ==
Deng Zhuodi was born on 1986 in the United States to Deng Zhifang, the son of Deng Xiaoping, and his wife Liu Xiaoyuan. At the time Deng Zhuodi was born, Deng Zhifang and Liu Xiaoyuan both were students at the University of Rochester in New York, where they earned Ph.Ds in biophysics and quantum physics respectively.

According to the United States nationality law, a child born in the United States automatically becomes an American citizen. However, according to the nationality law of China, children born abroad whose parents are both Chinese nationals shall have Chinese nationality. As a result, Deng Zhuodi's parents applied him for a Chinese passport at the Chinese Embassy in the United States and brought him back to China just after one month after his birth, where he received his Chinese citizenship. From 18 January to 21 February 1992, he took part in his grandfather's tour of South China.

== Education ==
From 2003 to 2007, he studied at the Peking University Law School. After graduation, he attended Duke University School of Law from 2007 to 2008. During his time in Duke, he went under the name David Zhuo, adopting his grandmother Zhuo Lin's surname, in order to avoid attention. After his graduation from Duke with master of law degree, he worked at a law firm in Wall Street, New York City.

== Political career ==
On 2 May 2013, Deng was appointed deputy head of Pingguo County in Guangxi Zhuang Autonomous Region, where he was in charge of development and reform, price, government legal system, agriculture, rural areas, poverty alleviation and major projects.

From 2014 to 2016, he served as the secretary of the party committee of Xin'an town in Pingguo County. A local person in Pingguo County stated that Deng gave the impression that he was knowledgeable and capable, but he was modest, prudent, diligent and eager to learn. He kept a low profile while in Guangxi and his resume was not shown on the website of the local government.

In 2016, Deng served as the deputy secretary of the party committee of Pingguo County and secretary of the party committee of Xin'an town.

== Post-political life ==
On 20 July 2016, Hong Kong media reported that Deng was no longer serving as deputy secretary of the party committee during the re-election process in Pingguo County. In March 2017, it was reported that he was serving as the director of the ninth council of Beijing Bridge Association. As of April 2024, he was reported as serving as a supervisor of CITIC Finance, a subsidiary of CITIC Group.
