= Kent Deng =

Economic history professor

Dr Kent Deng, FRHistS, is full professor in Economic History at the London School of Economics. He is a member of the Asian Research Centre and has been Secretary of the History and Economic Development Group UK since 2000.

== Life ==
Kent studied economic history in La Trobe University, Australia under the eminent economic historian Eric L. Jones. He was a lecturer in Economic History at Flinders University of South Australia, and senior lecturer in Economic History at Victoria University of Wellington, New Zealand. He has published widely in the field of Chinese maritime history and pre-modern trade. His current research concerns the economic history of South-East Asia, focussing on the comparison between China and the West in pre-modern and early modern history and the economic role of the Chinese peasantry.

== Bibliography ==
- Deng, K. & Shengmin, S. (2019) China's Extraordinary Population Expansion and Its Determinants during the Qing Period, 1644-1911. Population Review 58(1)
- Deng, K. & O'Brien, P. (2017) Why Maddison Was Wrong. World Economics Journal 18(2)
- Du, J & Deng, K.. (2017) Getting food prices right: the state versus the market in reforming China, 1979–2006. European Review of Economic History 21(3)
- Booth, A. & Deng, K. (2017) Japanese Colonialism in Comparative Perspective. Journal of World History 28(1)
- Deng, K. & O'Brien, P. (2016) Establishing statistical foundations of a chronology for the great divergence: a survey and critique of the primary sources for the construction of relative wage levels for Ming–Qing China. The Economic History Review, 69: 1057-1082
- Deng, K. & O'Brien, P. (2016) China's GDP Per Capita from the Han Dynasty to Communist Times. World Economics Journal 7(2)
- Deng, K. (2015) Mapping China’s Growth and Development in the Long Run, 221 BC to 2020. World Scientific Press and Imperial College Press
- Deng, K. & O’Brien, P. (2016) Nutritional Standards of Living in England and the Yangtze Delta (Jiangnan), circa 1644–circa 1840: Clarifying Data for Reciprocal Comparisons. Journal of World History 26(2)
- Deng, K. and Zheng, L. (2015) Growth and Development in Northern Song China, 960-1127. The Economic History Review 68(4)
- Deng, K. (2011) China’s Political Economy in Modern Times: Changes and Economic Consequences, 1800–2000. Routledge Press
