= Lee C. Teng =

Taiwanese physicist

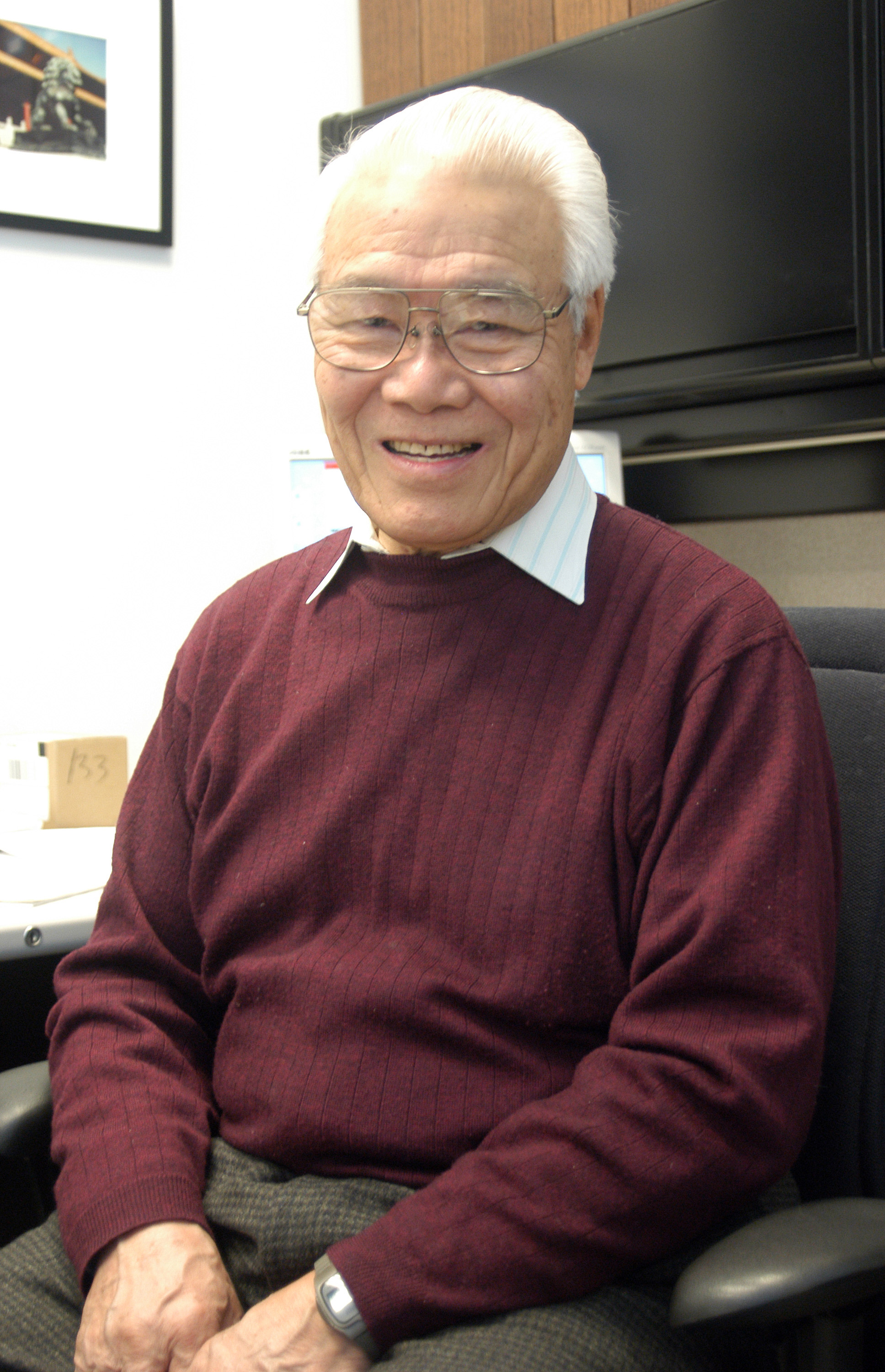

Lee C. Teng (Chinese: 鄧昌黎; pinyin: Dèng Chāng–lí; 5 September 1926 – 24 June 2022) was a Chinese-born physicist known for his work with the Advanced Photon Source of the Argonne National Laboratory. He made numerous contributions to the field of accelerator physics.

== Career ==
Teng was born in Beijing, China, but his ancestral home was in Fuzhou. He graduated from the Catholic University of Peking (now Fu Jen University) in Beijing in 1946. Teng left his native China in 1947 to attend graduate school in physics at the University of Chicago.

After receiving his PhD in 1951, Lee worked at the University of Minnesota, the Wichita State University, Argonne National Laboratory, and the Fermi National Accelerator Laboratory (Fermilab). He was the director of the Particle Accelerator Division at Argonne National Laboratory.

In 1983, Teng took a partial leave of absence from Fermilab to serve as the founding director of what is now the National Synchrotron Radiation Research Center (NSRRC) in Taiwan.

== Honors ==
In 1956, on his first trip to Taiwan, he was awarded the Gold Medal of Achievement by the Ministry of Education.

In 1957, he was elected an APS fellow.

He received the Distinguished Service Award from the American Immigrants Service League in 1962.

In 1966 he was elected to member (Academician) of Academia Sinica.

He was conferred an honorary professor of the Beijing Normal University in 1970.

In 2007, the American Physical Society awarded Teng the Robert R. Wilson Prize for Achievement in the Physics of Particle Accelerators.

The Lee Teng Internship in Accelerator Science and Engineering was created jointly by Argonne, Fermilab, and the US Particle Accelerator School in 2007, in his honor.

== Death ==
Teng died on 24 June 2022, after a period in hospice care.
