= Malaysian Institute of Art =

Coordinates: 3.21053°N 101.74623°E

Malaysian Institute of Art (MIA)
- Institut Seni Lukis Malaysia (Malay) 马来西亚艺术学院 (Chinese)
- Established: 1967
- Chairman: Khoo Ee Peng
- President: Dr. Lok Lay Hong
- Location: Taman Melawati, Kuala Lumpur, Malaysia
- Website: www.mia.edu.my

Chinese name
- Simplified Chinese: 马来西亚艺术学院
- Traditional Chinese: 馬來西亞藝術學院
Transcriptions
Standard Mandarin
- Hanyu Pinyin: Mǎláixīyà Yìshù Xuéyuàn

Malaysian Institute of Art, abbreviated as MIA, in Chinese named as 马来西亚艺术学院， was founded in 1967 as a higher art education provider and accredited by the Malaysia Ministry of Higher Education.

MIA provides courses in the field of creative art and music with course contents at its own campus located at Taman Melawati, Kuala Lumpur, Malaysia. Compared to other arts institutions in Malaysia, they focus more on drawing, painting and other visual arts.

Several Piala Seri Endon prize winners have come out of MIA.
