= Toyota Belta =

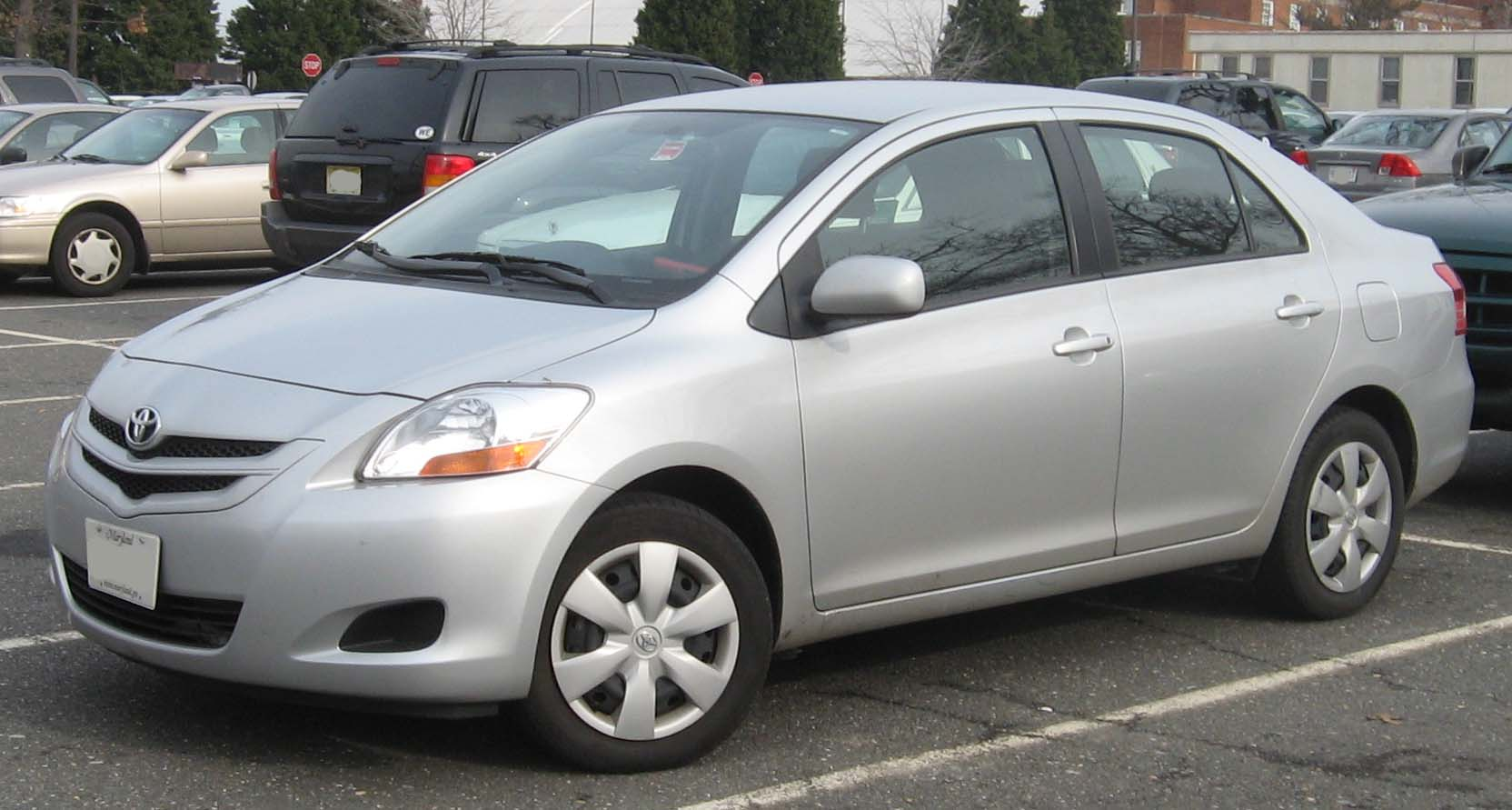
- Toyota Yaris sedan (NCP93L; pre-facelift, US)

Overview
- Manufacturer: Toyota
- Model code: XP90
- Also called: Toyota Yaris sedan (international); Toyota Vios (China and Southeast Asia); Toyota Limo (taxi version, Indonesia)
- Production: November 2005 – June 2012 (Japan, extended for export until July 2016); February 2007 – January 2014 (Vios/Limo)
- Model years: 2006–2016
- Assembly: Japan: Kanegasaki, Iwate (Kanto Auto Works, Belta/Yaris sedan); China: Tianjin (TFTM, Vios) (February 2008–July 2013); Malaysia: Shah Alam, Selangor (UMWT, Vios) (October 2007–October 2013); Philippines: Santa Rosa (TMP, Vios) (August 2007–July 2013); Thailand: Chachoengsao (TMT, Vios/Limo) (February 2007–April 2013); Vietnam: Vĩnh Phúc (TMV, Vios, September 2007–January 2014)
- Designer: Junichi Furuyama (chief engineer); Takashi Hagino, Motoaki Sakaue, Hideo Kouyama, Koichi Sumigama and Daisuke Iguchi (pre-facelift); Jiro Okimoto and Yohei Kusamoto (facelift, Belta/Yaris sedan)

Body and chassis
- Class: Subcompact car
- Body style: 4-door sedan
- Layout: Front-engine, front-wheel-drive; Front-engine, four-wheel-drive (Belta only)
- Platform: Toyota B platform
- Related: Toyota Aqua/Prius c (NHP10); Toyota Corolla Axio/Fielder (E160); Toyota Ist/Urban Cruiser/Scion xD (XP110); Toyota Porte/Spade (XP140); Toyota Ractis/Verso-S/Subaru Trezia (XP120); Toyota Vitz/Yaris (XP90)

Powertrain
- Engine: Petrol: 1.0 L 1KR-FE I3; 1.3 L 2SZ-FE I4; 1.3 L 2NZ-FE I4; 1.5 L 1NZ-FE I4; 1.6 L 1ZR-FE I4
- Transmission: 5-speed C50/C54 manual; 4-speed U340E/U441E/U441F automatic; K410 CVT

Dimensions
- Wheelbase: 2,550 mm (100.4 in)
- Length: 4,300 mm (169.3 in)
- Width: 1,690–1,700 mm (66.5–66.9 in)
- Height: 1,460–1,490 mm (57.5–58.7 in)
- Kerb weight: 990–1,125 kg (2,183–2,480 lb)

Chronology
- Predecessor: Toyota Platz/Yaris/Echo sedan (XP10) (international); Toyota Vios (XP40) (China and Southeast Asia)
- Successor: Toyota Corolla Axio (E160) (Japan); Toyota Vios/Yaris (XP150) (emerging markets); Scion iA/Toyota Yaris sedan (North America)

The Toyota Belta (Japanese: トヨタ・ベルタ, Hepburn: Toyota Beruta), marketed as the Vios in selected Asian markets and elsewhere as the Yaris sedan (or simply as Yaris, for markets where the hatchback version is not available), is a subcompact sedan manufactured by Toyota.

The successor to the Platz, the Belta has increased in size over the previous generation such that its interior volume is comparable to the E120 series Corolla. The Belta went on sale in Japan on 28 November 2005 equipped with 1.0 to 1.3 L engines and was available at Toyopet Store and Toyota Corolla Store dealerships. International sales began in early 2006, featured 1.3 to 1.6 L engines, depending on the market. The sedan was introduced as second generation Vios for Southeast Asian market in April 2007 and for the Chinese market in February 2008, succeeding the XP40 series Vios.

In June 2012, the Japanese market Belta was discontinued and replaced by the E160 series Corolla Axio, and it was dropped in Canada and US to be replaced by the Mazda2 sedan-based Scion iA/Yaris sedan in July 2015. The sedan was offered until December 2014 in New Zealand and in Australia until July 2016.

For Asia-Pacific (China, Southeast Asia, South Asia, Middle East and Pacific islands), North Africa and Latin America (including Caribbean islands), the XP150 series Yaris sedan/Vios replaced the XP90 model in March 2013 as the sedan counterpart to the XP150 series Yaris hatchback.

The "Belta" nameplate was revived in November 2021 for the rebadged Suzuki Ciaz sold in Africa.

The name "Belta" is a contraction of the Italian words "bella gente", or "beautiful people".

== Development ==
The XP90 series Vitz and Belta share underpinnings with each other including the powertrain and platform. However, while the Vitz was designed at Toyota's French design studio (Toyota ED²), the Belta was designed at Toyota's Japanese design studio (TMC Design Division) — design projects for similar cars marketed toward different demographics. While the outgoing XP10 series Vitz and Platz models look and feel very much alike, the newer Vitz hatchback and Belta sedan are more subtly related. No sheetmetal is shared between the two, and although both have a similar centralized dashboard design (Toyota's efforts to standardize the design for all markets, left or right hand drive at the time), there are some cosmetic differences. It has a drag coefficient of Cd=0.29, marginally more aerodynamic than its hatchback counterpart.

The Belta and global market Yaris sedan were manufactured in Japan, while the Vios nameplate was manufactured in either China, Malaysia, Philippines, Thailand or Vietnam.

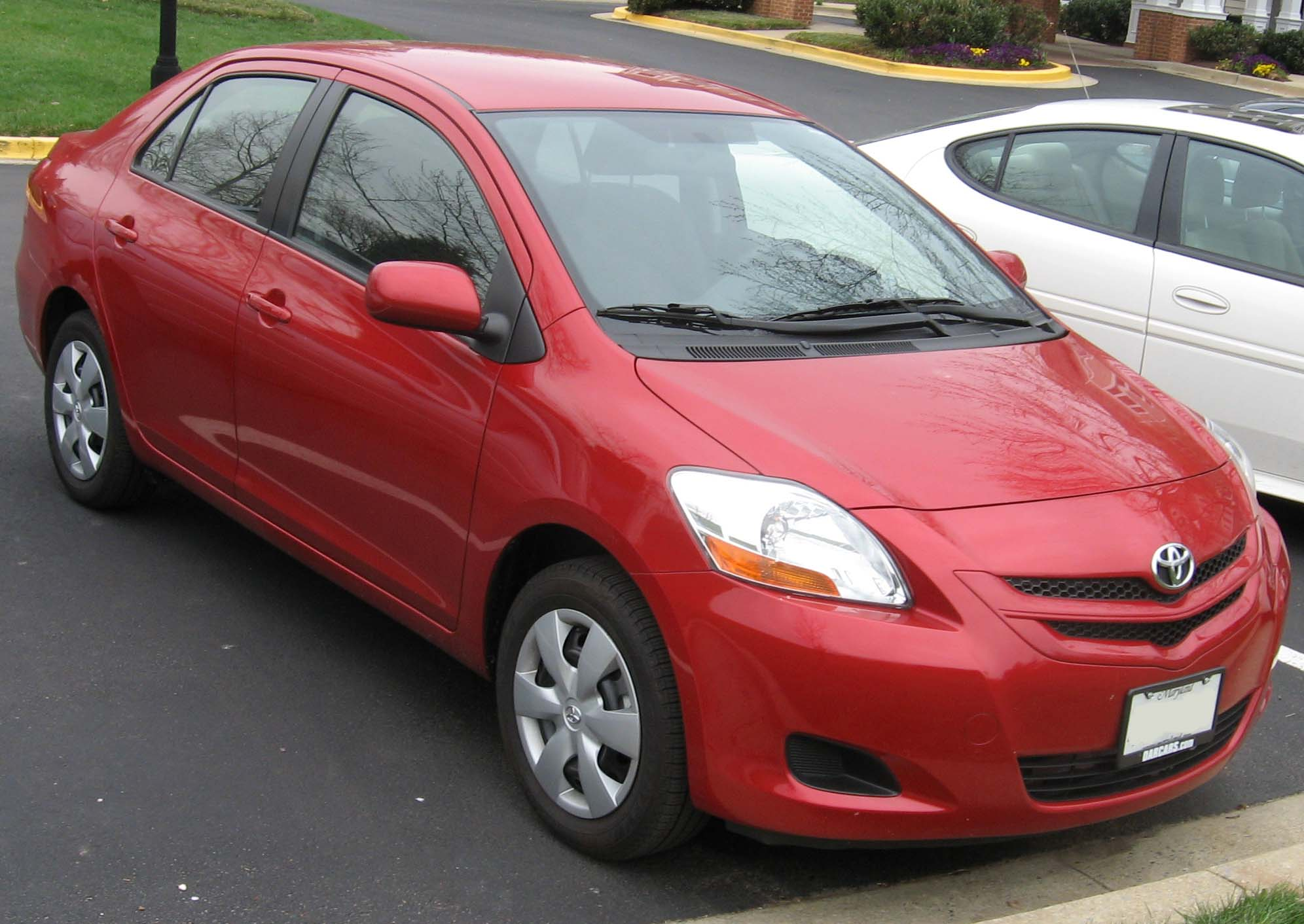
Pre-facelift

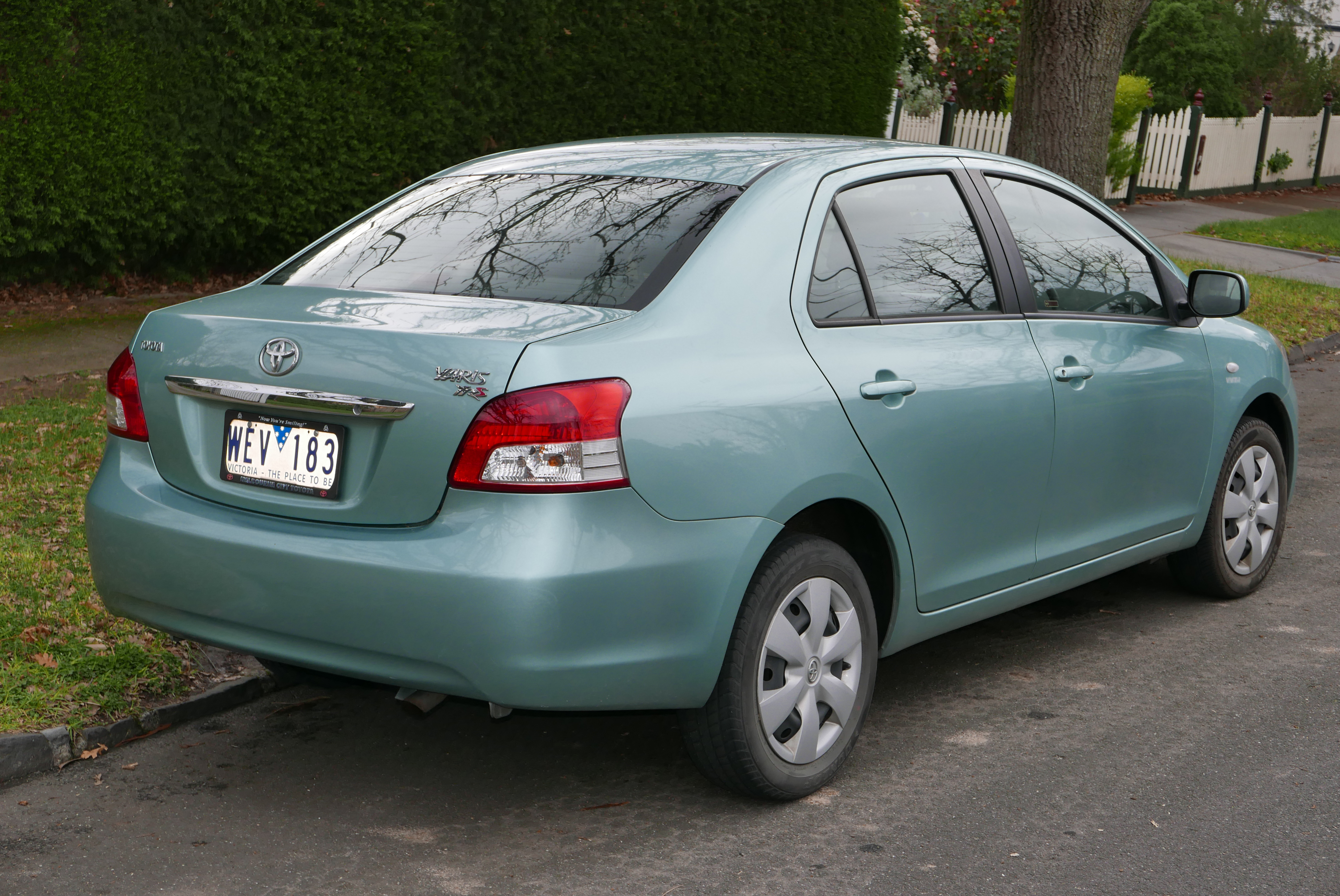
Pre-facelift model, retained for facelifted Belta/Yaris sedan

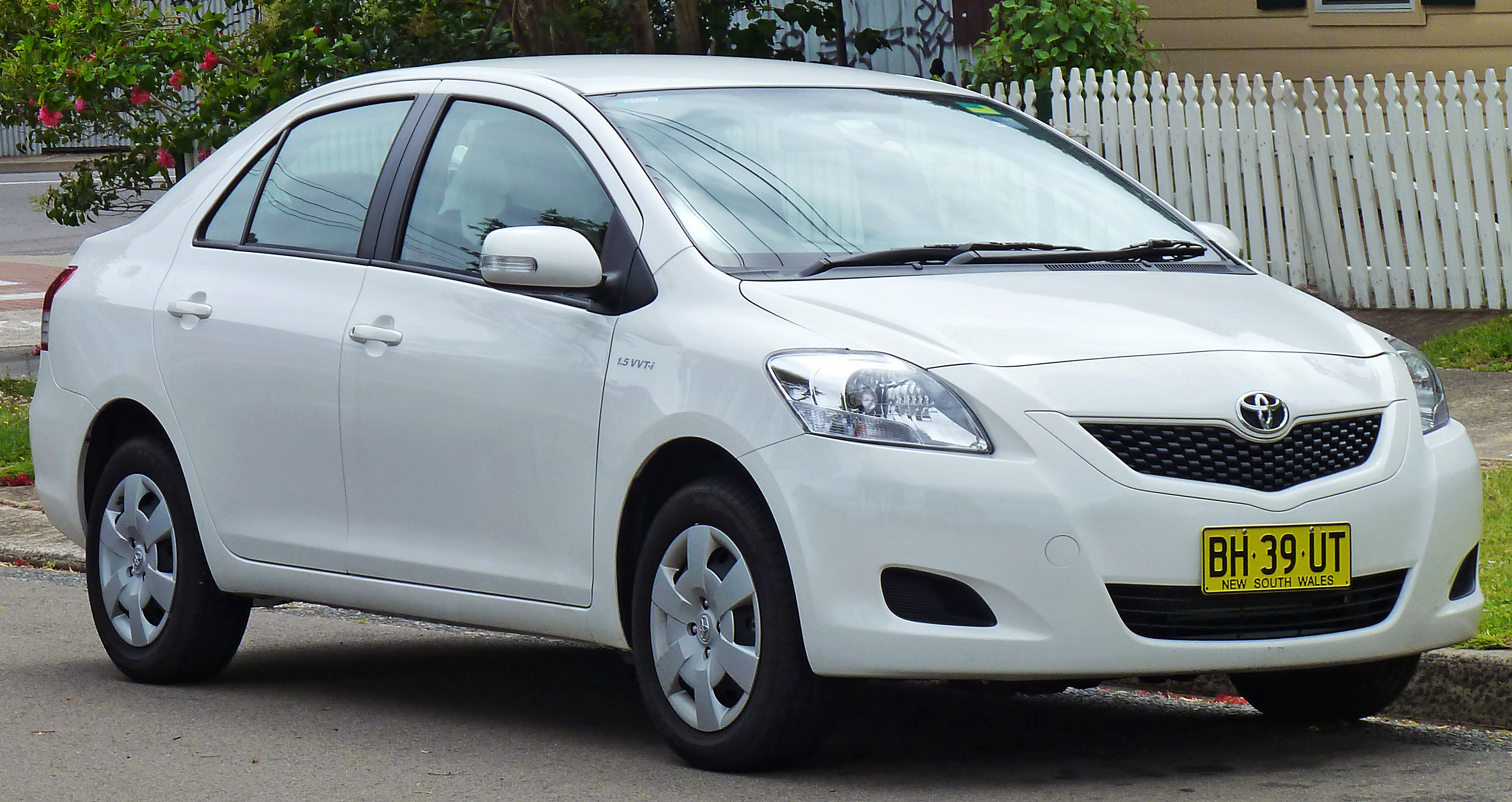
Facelifted Belta/Yaris sedan

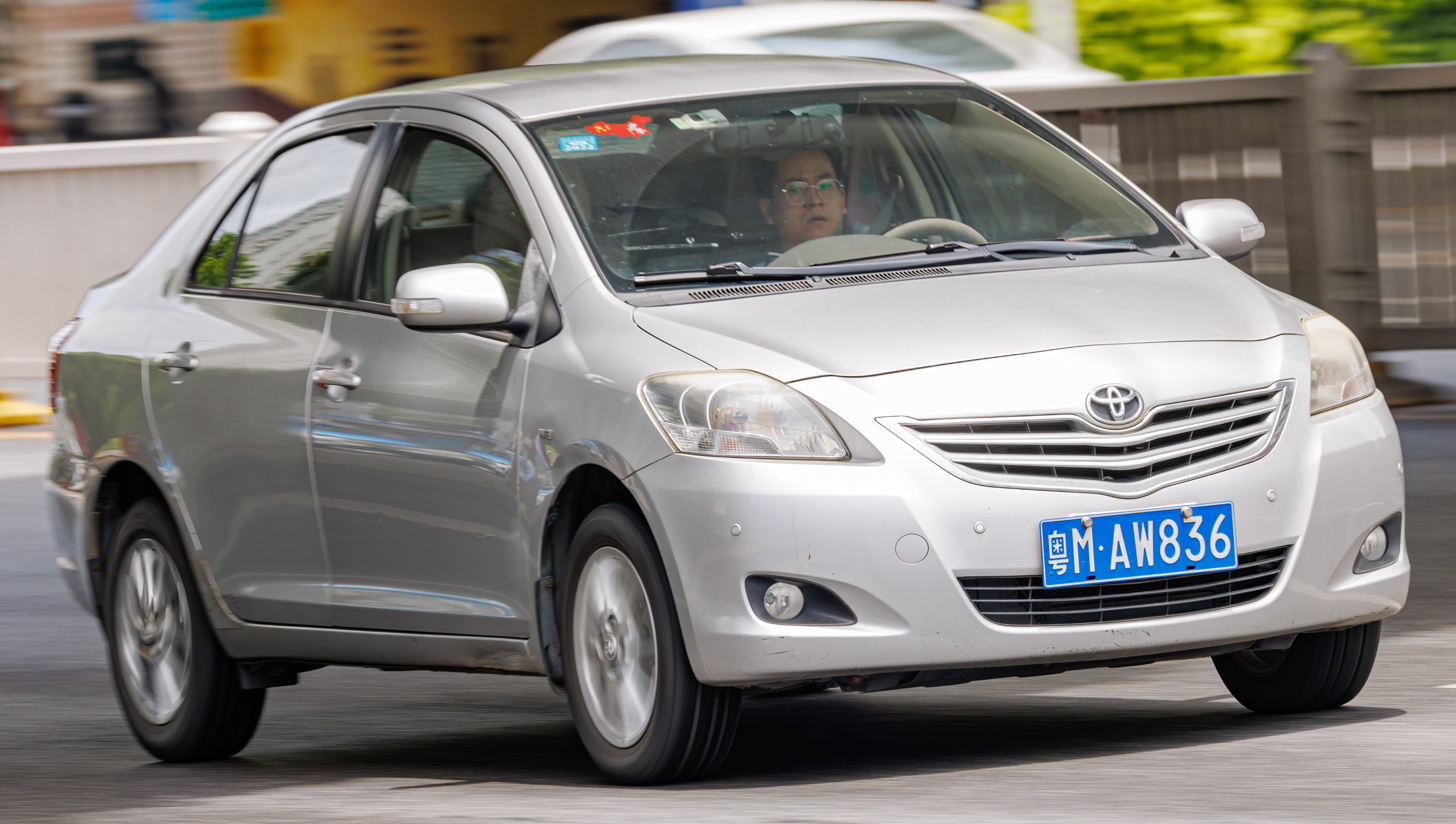
Facelifted Vios

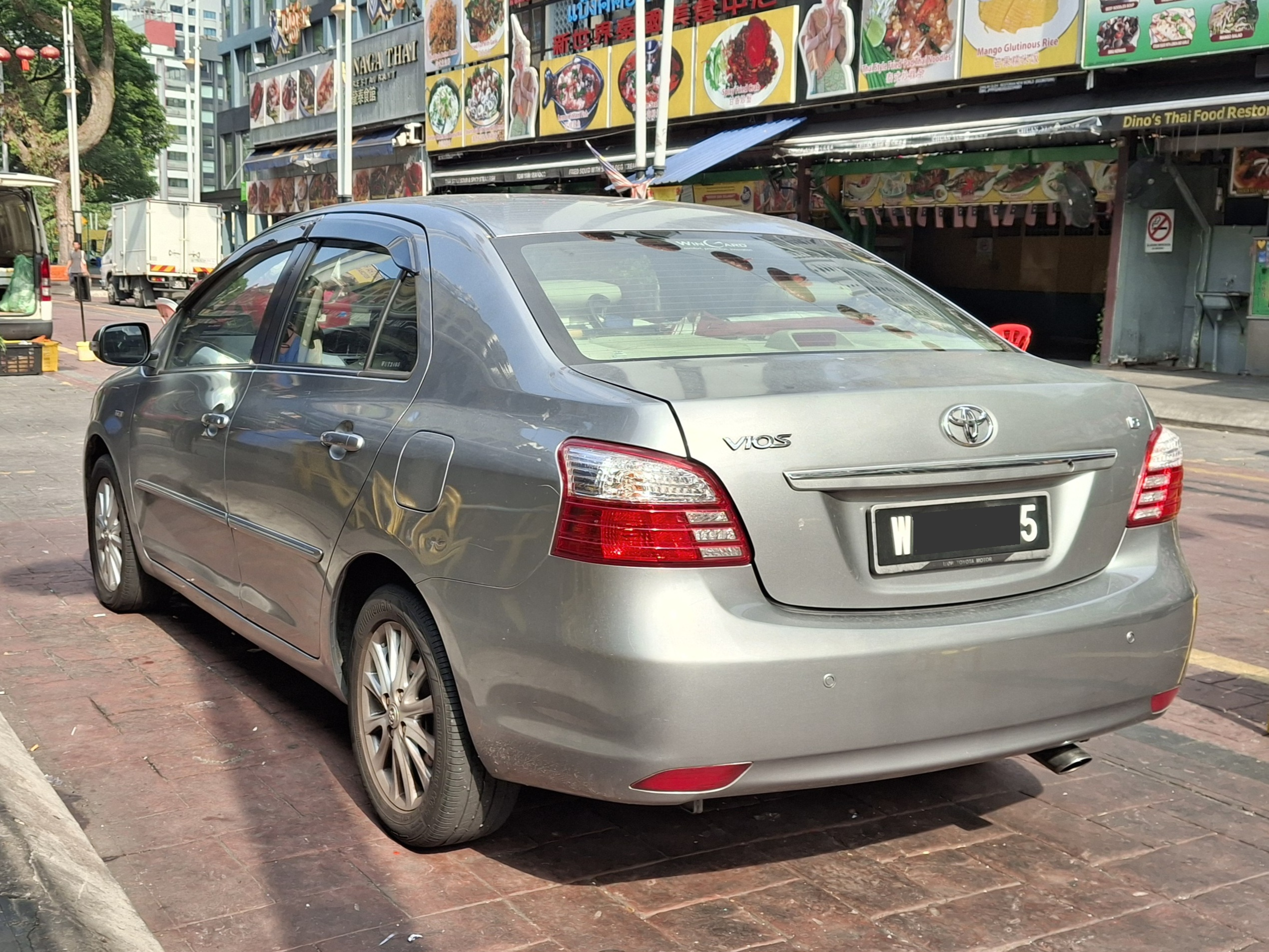
Facelifted Vios

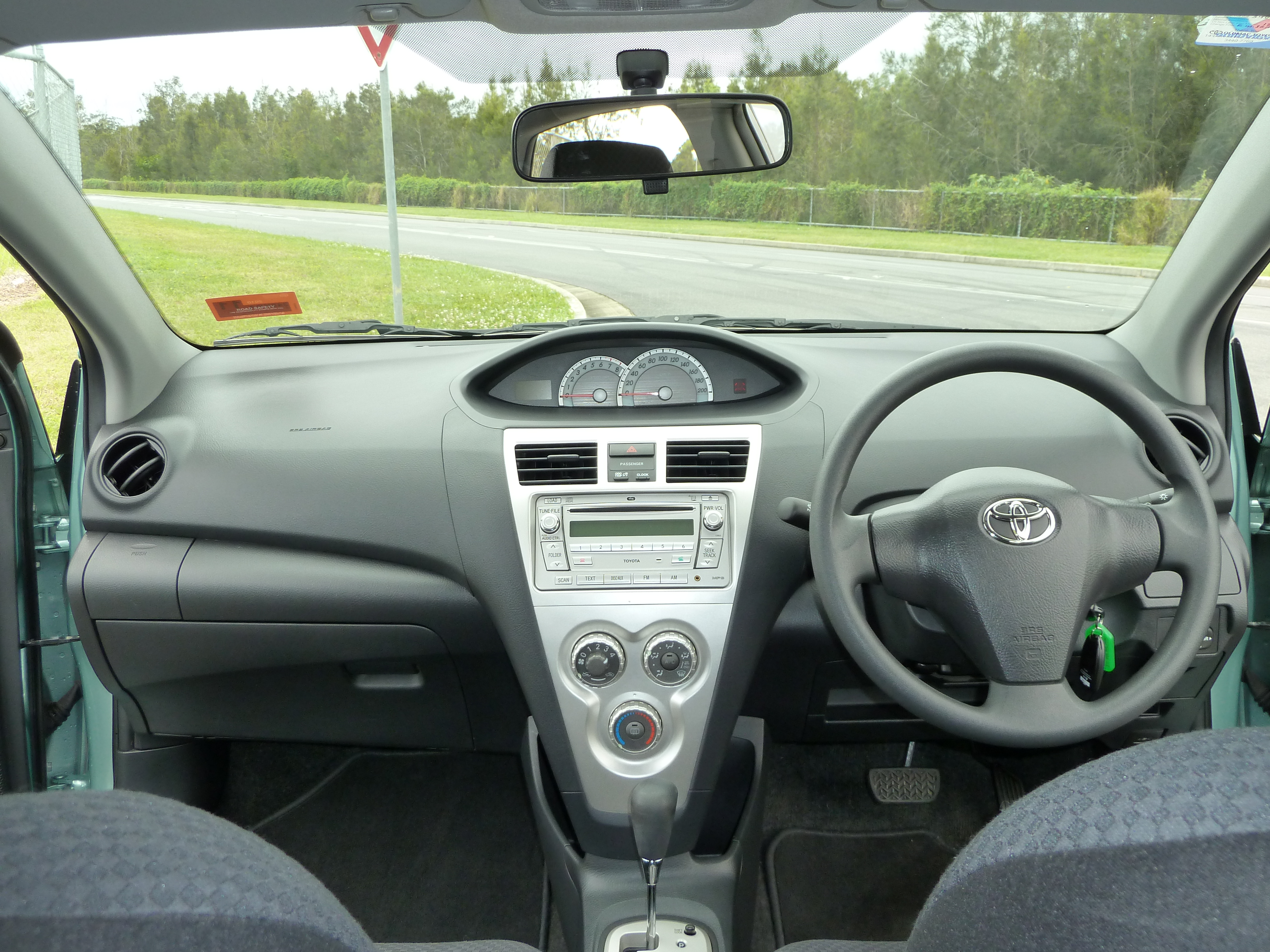
Pre-facelift interior, retained for facelifted model (with a refreshed instrument cluster) except for Southeast Asian market Vios

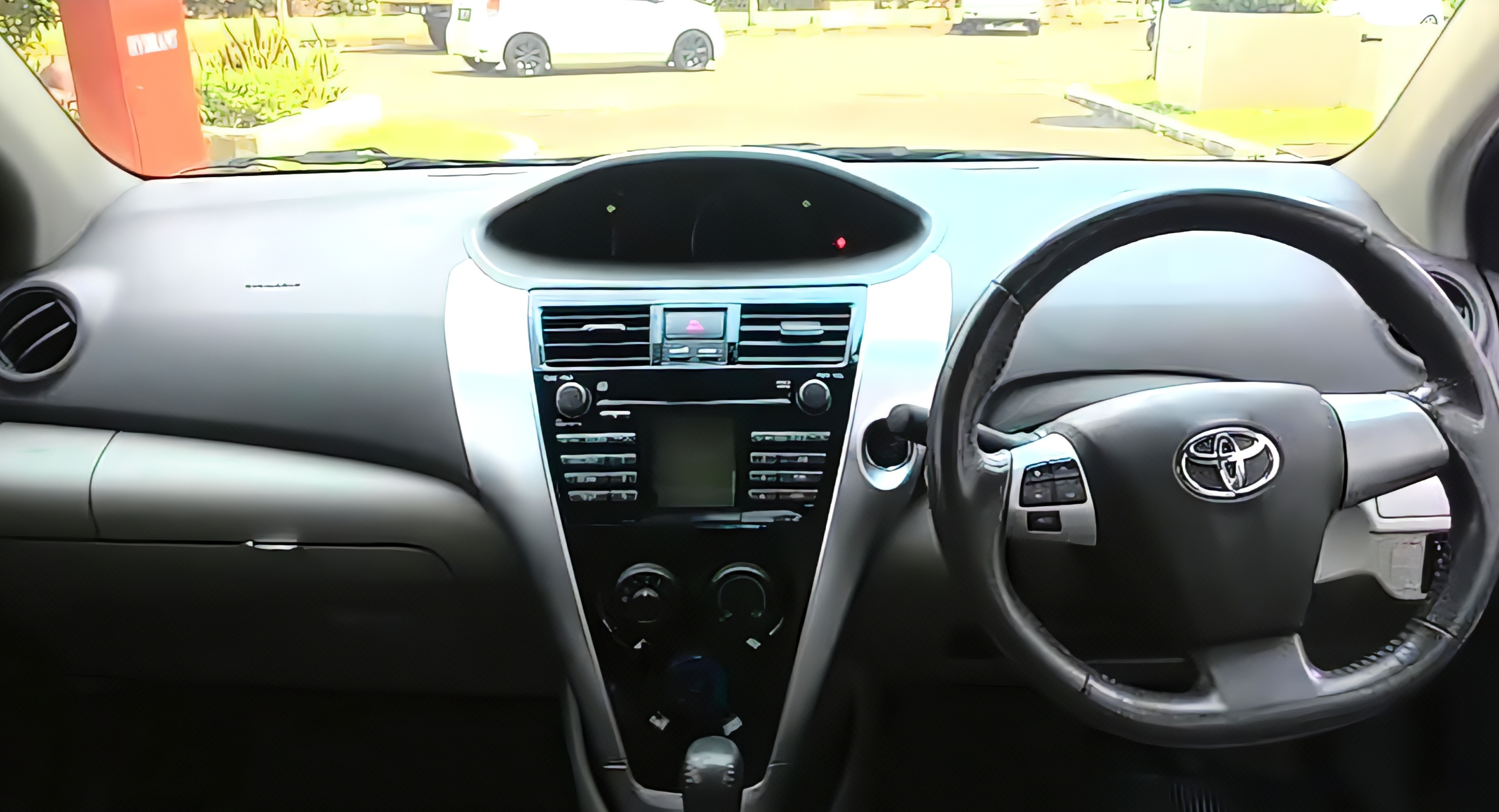
Facelifted interior for Southeast Asian market Vios

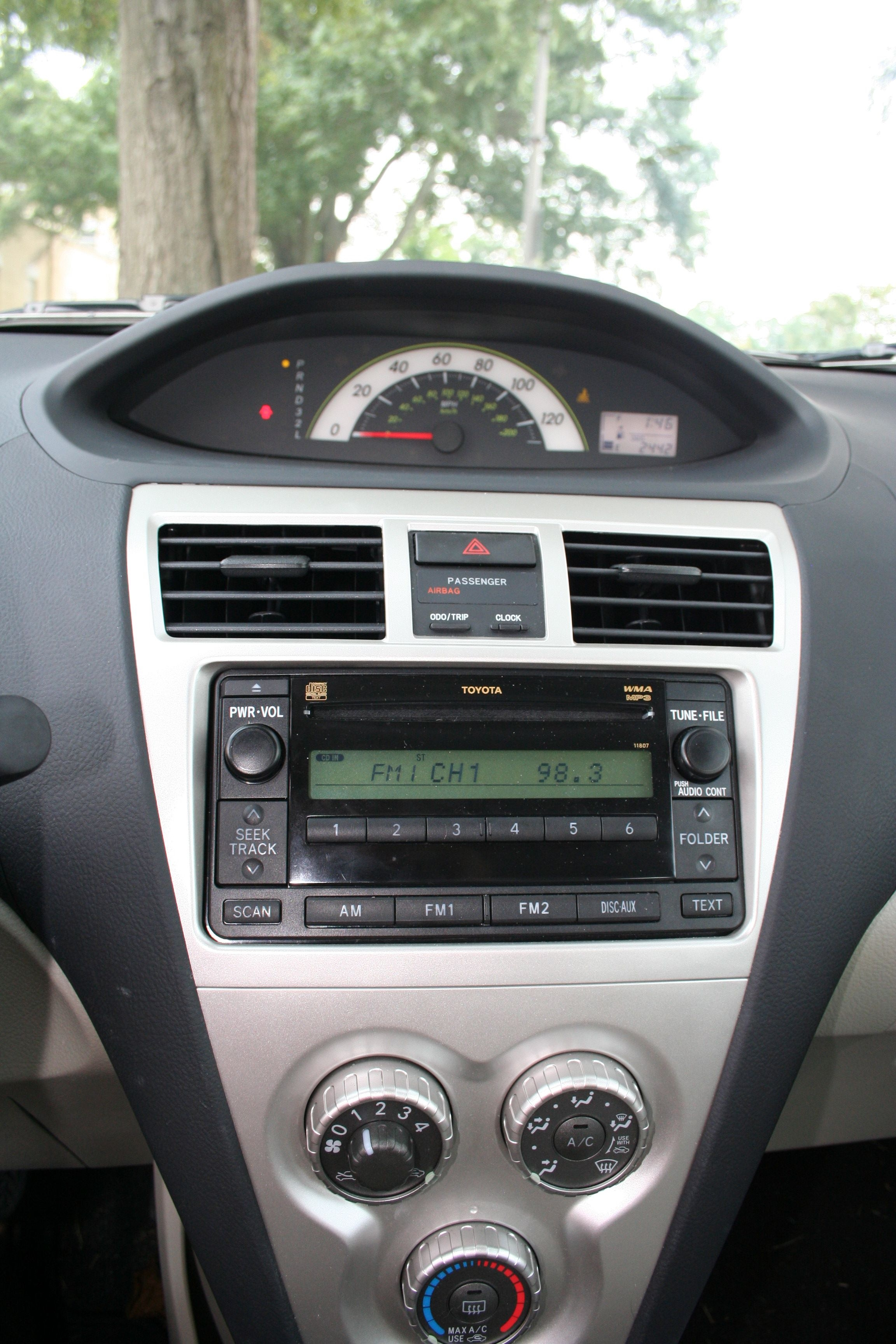
A simpler instrument cluster without tachometer for base model Belta and Yaris sedan

== Markets ==
=== Asia ===
For the Chinese and Southeast Asian markets, the Belta was sold as the second generation Vios. However, the sedan was sold as the Yaris sedan in the Middle East and several countries in South Asia.

As was the first generation Vios, the second generation Vios was continued its assembly in China, Malaysia, Thailand and Vietnam. In addition, Toyota Motor Philippines (TMP) also started manufacturing second generation Vios locally in Santa Rosa, Laguna.

==== Japan ====
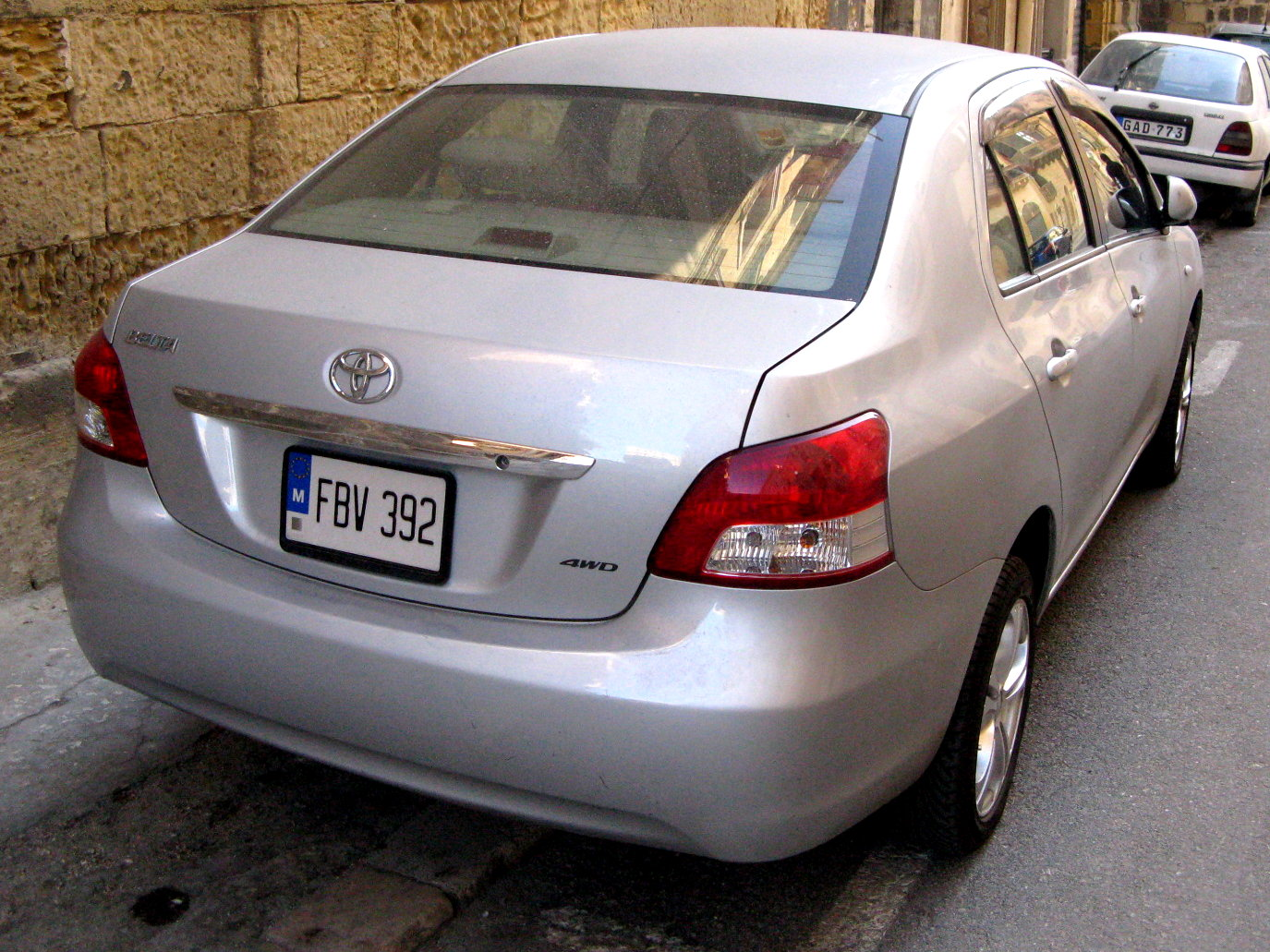
A grey import Toyota Belta X 4WD (NCP96) registered in Malta

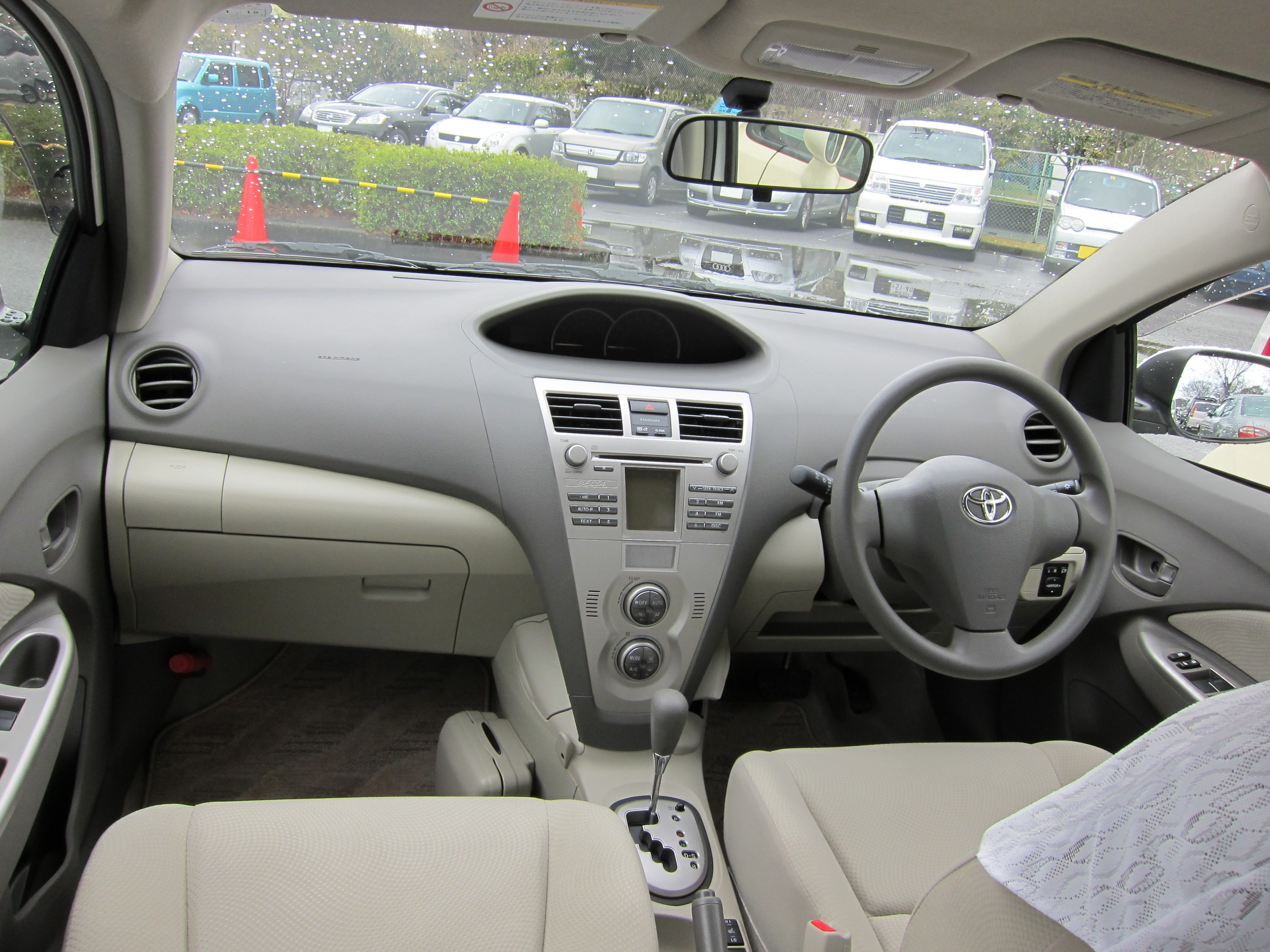
Exclusive automatic climate control option for Belta (facelifted model with redesigned interior)

Debuted in November 2005, the Japanese market Belta had three engine variants available, namely the 71 PS (52 kW; 70 hp) 1.0 L 1KR-FE straight-three engine (KSP92) and two variants of the 1.3 L inline-four engines, 2NZ-FE (NCP96) or 2SZ-FE (SCP92), both rated at 87 PS (64 kW; 86 hp). The 1KR-FE and 2SZ-FE engines comes with Super CVT-i transmission and not available elsewhere, while the 2NZ-FE engine has a 4-speed Super ECT transmission and only available with AWD system as standard. The sedan was offered with two trim levels; X (available with sporty "S Package" option) and G. The 1.0 L engine is not available for the G trim and the AWD system is available for both trims with the 1.3 L 2NZ-FE engine. In October 2006, the cheaper model called "Business A/B Package" was introduced, aimed for the company fleet market. It is basically X trim with less equipments.

The Belta received a facelift in August 2008, the exterior was updated with new honeycomb grille, new mirror wings with blinker and redesign hubcaps. For the interior, the instrument cluster and seat upholstery were redesigned, the driver's seat was also equipped with heater for the G trim. The sporty "S Package" was also abolished (although it was still available as dealer optional accessories for every trim) and being replaced by luxury "L Package" (added some equipment from G trim such as driver's heated seat, automatic climate control etc.). The sedan was discontinued for the Japanese market in 2012 and succeeded by the Corolla Axio, although it was still produced for the export market until 2016.

==== Southeast Asia ====
===== Malaysia =====
The second generation Vios was unveiled in Kuala Lumpur, Malaysia on 5 October 2007, two weeks ahead of its official launch on 19 October 2007. The Vios is powered exclusively by the same 1NZ-FE 1.5 L four-cylinder engine with VVT-i used in the old Vios, but included a redesigned air intake and exhaust system to improve low to mid-range torque. It was also fitted with the Super ECT four-speed automatic with the same gear ratios as its predecessor, but with improved programming for the transmission control unit. Electric power steering was offered in place of the hydraulic system in its predecessor. The second generation Vios was made available in four trim levels for the Malaysian market: J, E, G and S.

The J is the base version. It was initially unavailable at the Malaysian Vios launch in October 2007, but was introduced on 1 July 2008, offering a choice of either 5-speed manual or 4-speed automatic transmissions.

The E and G differ mostly in terms of equipment levels and are mechanically identical, both sharing the 4-speed Super ECT transmission.

The S is an addition featuring cosmetic enhancements, including a front bumper spoiler, side skirts, rear skirt and a bootlid spoiler. The interior received a dark grey/black trim treatment and an Optitron meter with a multi-information display, as opposed to the E and G trims' conventional backlit display. The S trim was the most expensive Vios variant. On 17 June 2009, UMW Toyota launched the Vios 1.5 TRD Sportivo which effectively replaced the S trim. It featured a body kit, Enkei wheels, various interior trim improvements and an optional sports suspension kit.

On 15 April 2010, the Vios received a facelift in Malaysia, offering mostly cosmetic improvements. The Vios TRD Sportivo was updated on 29 June 2011, featuring a redesigned grille, unique alloy wheels and leather seats. Another new grade positioned between G and TRD Sportivo called the G Limited was also introduced offering a body kit, 15-inch alloy wheels and leather seats. The Vios was updated on 21 June 2012 in response to Honda Malaysia's facelift of the fifth generation City, with appearance changes without significant mechanical improvements.

All model grades included ABS with EBD and BA at the October 2007 launch, but the E trim was only offered with a single driver's airbag, whereas the G and S trims had an additional passenger airbag. The J trim had no airbags at all upon its July 2008 launch, but was nonetheless offered with ABS + EBD and BA. The J trim later received a driver's airbag in its 2010 facelift and a front passenger airbag in its 2012 update.

The Malaysian Vios was assembled locally by ASSB, a subsidiary of UMW Toyota, in Shah Alam, Selangor. The Vios has since become the best selling non-national badged vehicle in Malaysia, achieving record sales in 2012.

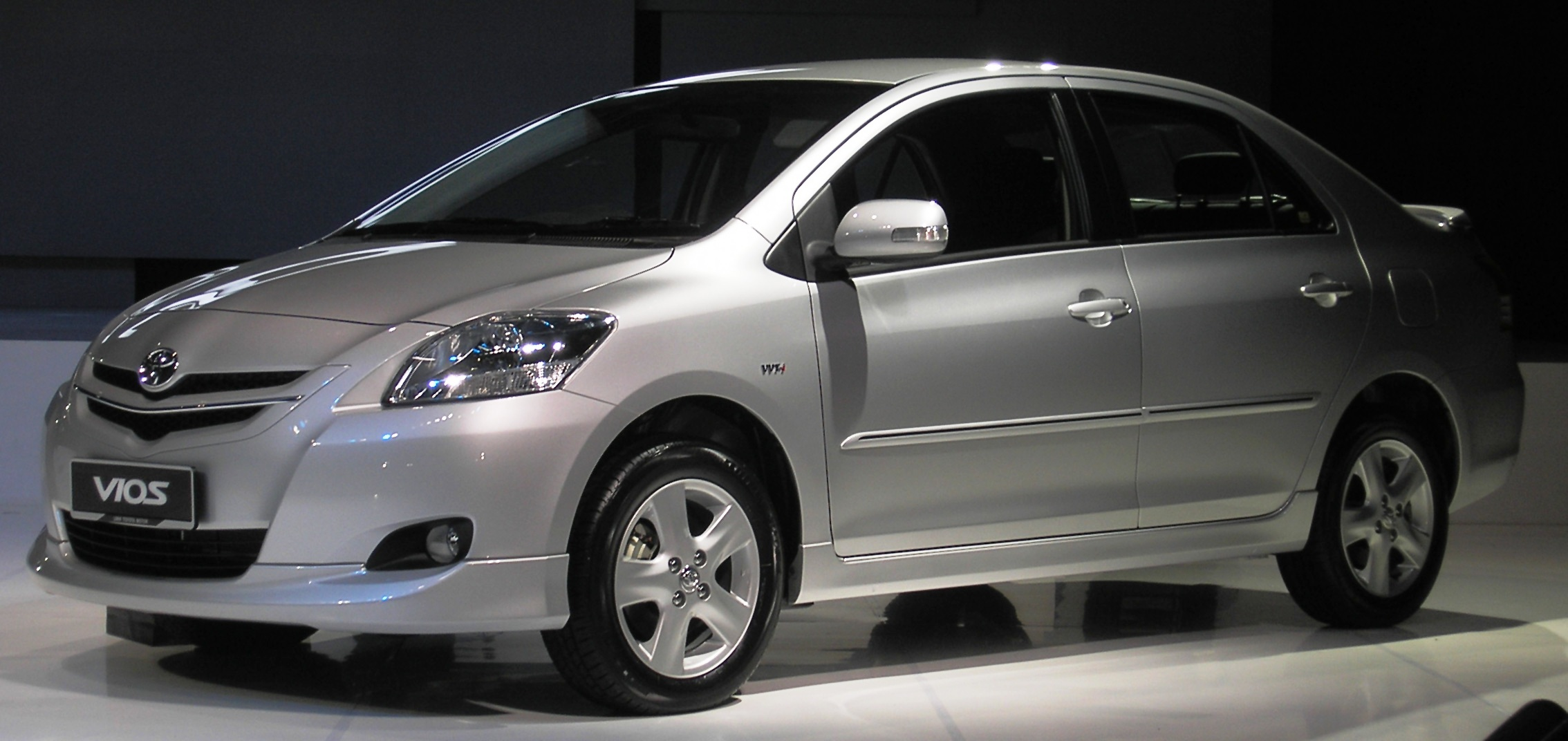
Pre-facelift Malaysian market Toyota Vios S (NCP93R)

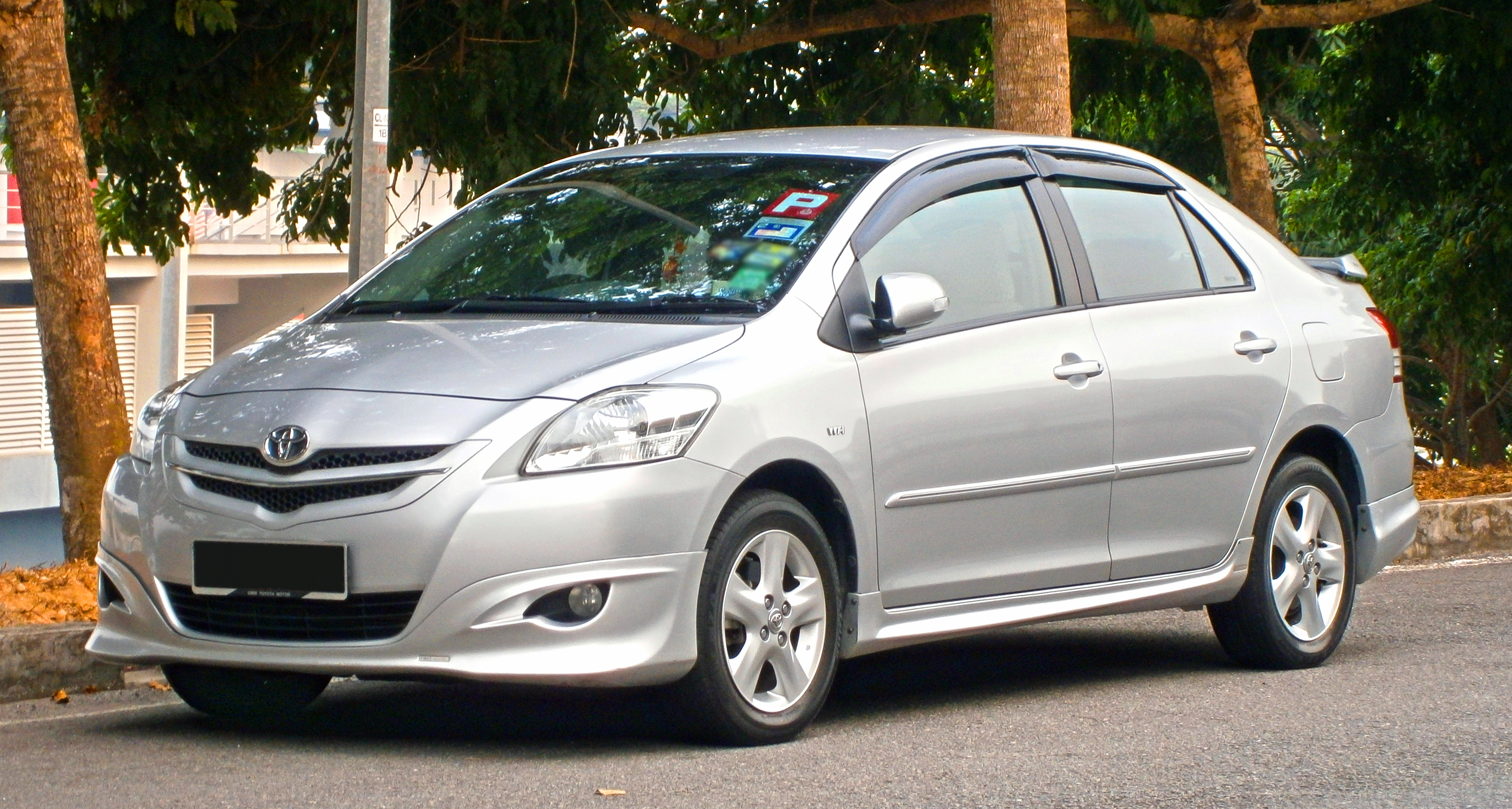
Pre-facelift Malaysian market Toyota Vios G with TRD Sportivo body kits (NCP93R)

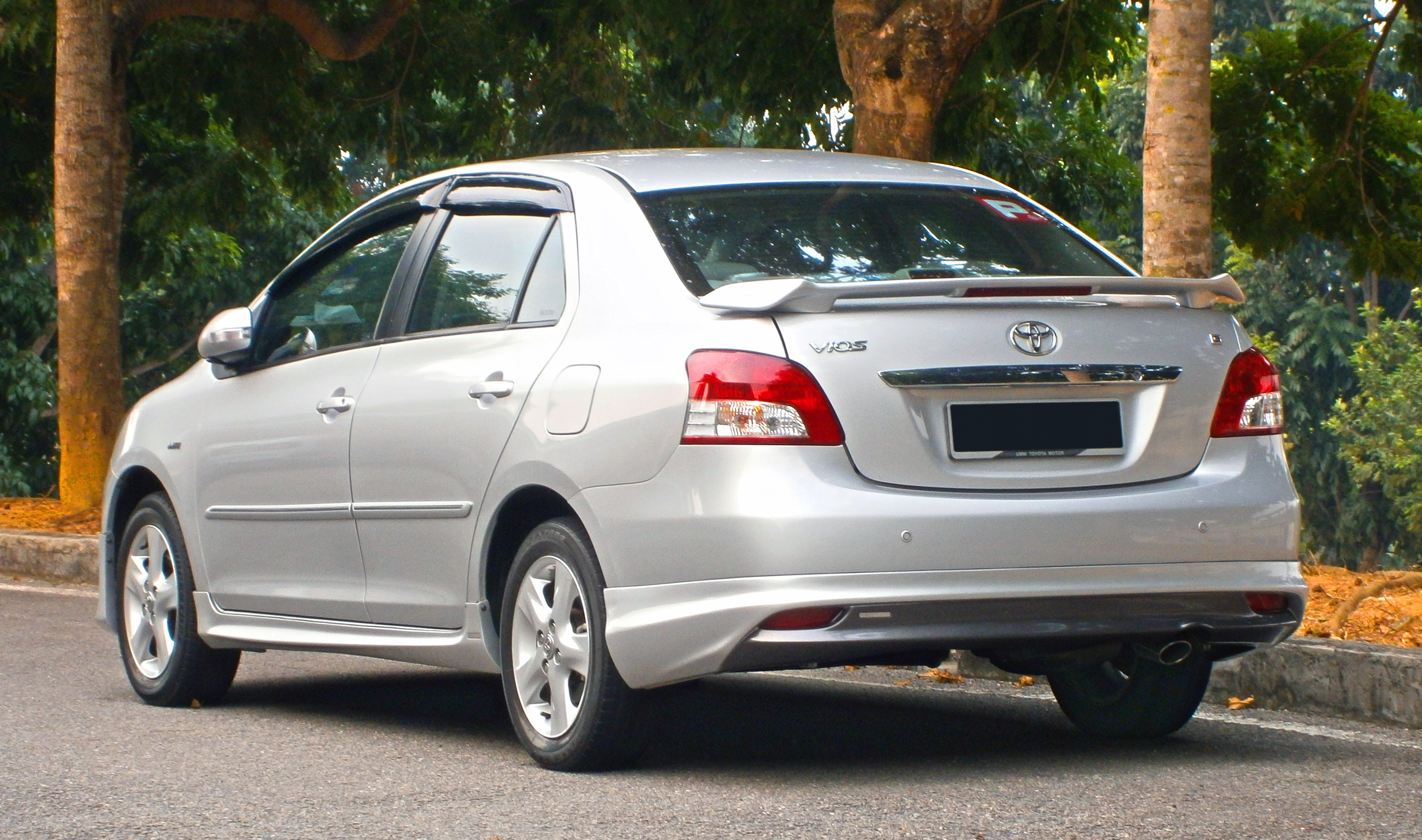
Pre-facelift Malaysian market Toyota Vios G with TRD Sportivo body kits (NCP93R)

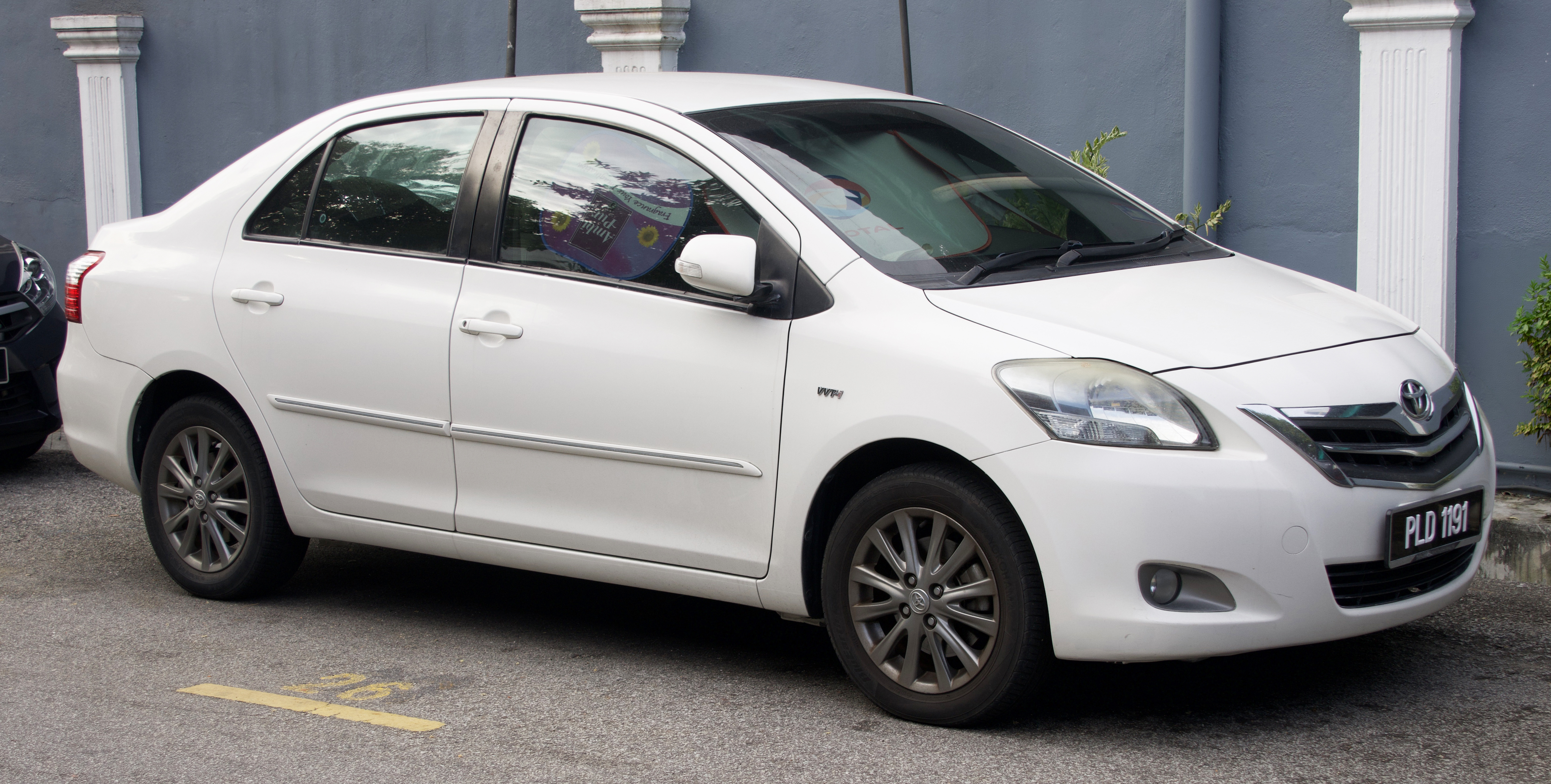
2012 improvement Malaysian market Toyota Vios G (NCP93R)

===== Philippines =====
The second generation Vios was launched in August 2007 and assembled locally by Toyota Motor Philippines (TMP) at their production plant in Santa Rosa, Laguna. Toyota spent PHP 1 billion to retool the plant in preparation for the assembly of the sedan in the Philippines. As before, it was available in three trim levels: 1.3 J, 1.3 E and 1.5 G.

To commemorate TMP's 20th anniversary, the 1.5 G XX Limited was introduced in August 2008, with a total production of only 800 units. This is the same as the G trim, but came with HID headlights, 17-inch 10-spoke alloy wheels and a small spoiler. In July 2009, another limited edition called 1.5 S was added to the line up. It almost identical to the earlier limited-edition model but featured different 17-inch Rota Bolognia Mags with 205/45 tires. The XX Limited and S Limited trims were released in different colour schemes. TRD kits such as all-around body kits, a spoiler, 15- or 17-inch wheels and performance shockbreakers were also available as a separate option.

The facelifted model was launched in April 2010 with the same appearance as other market Vios. For 2012, the 1.3 L 2NZ-FE engine for the G trim was released, and it was mated to a 4-speed automatic transmission, then later a 5-speed manual transmission, equipped with fog lights and 15-inch alloy wheels. Three new trims were also available from 2012, new cheapest trim called 1.3 Base, a trim slotted between the J and E trims called the 1.3 J Limited which added fog lights, 15-inch alloy wheels, front passenger airbag and more colors option from the E trim, and a limited edition based on 1.5 G trim called the SE Limited, distinguished by its Belta/Yaris sedan-style black grille. Replacing the SE Limited, the 1.5 TRD Sportivo trim was released in 2013 with additional side skirts, a spoiler and 17-inch wheels. However, it did not come with additional body kit like the neighboring countries or pre-facelift model.

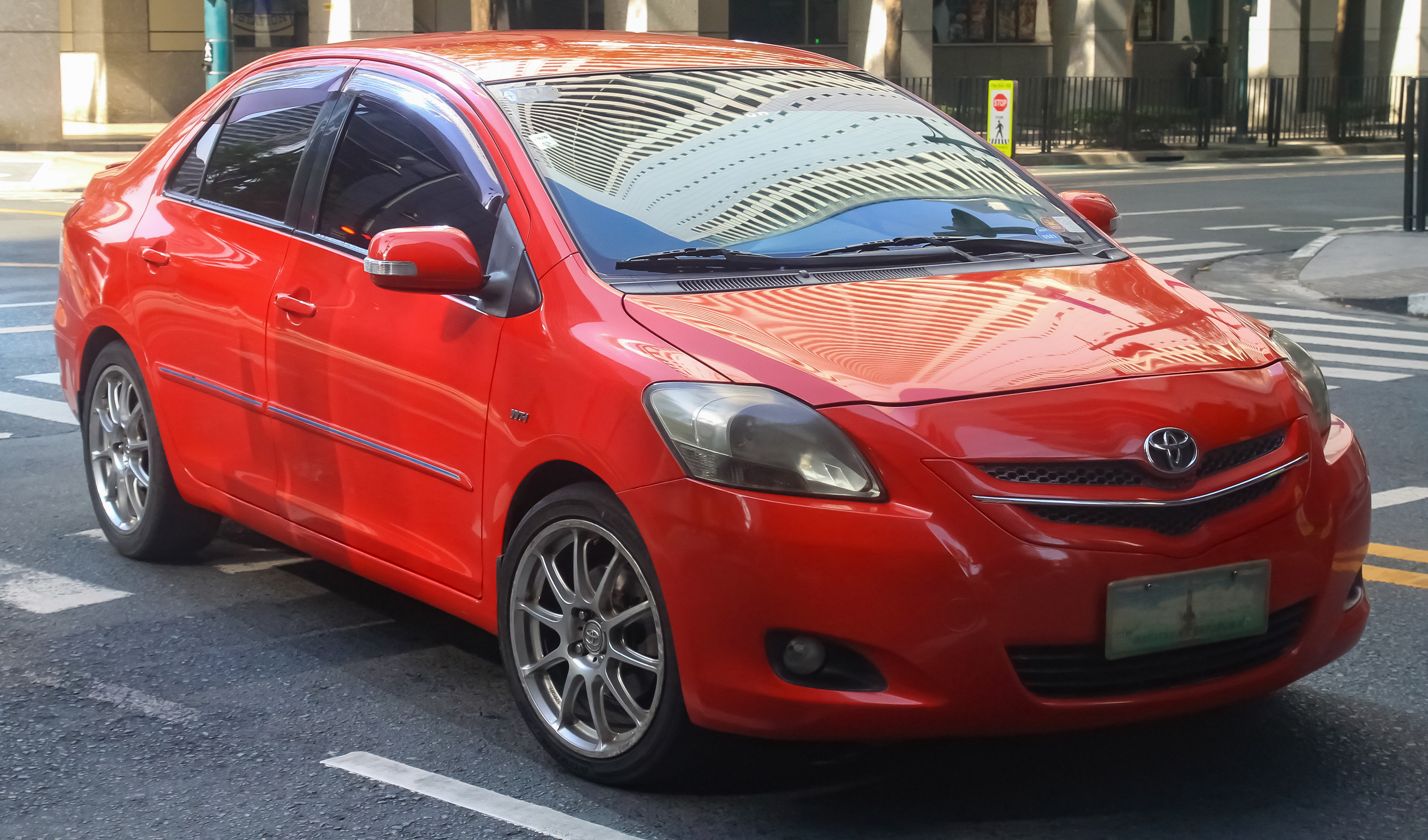
Pre-facelift Philippine market Toyota Vios G XX Limited (NCP93L)

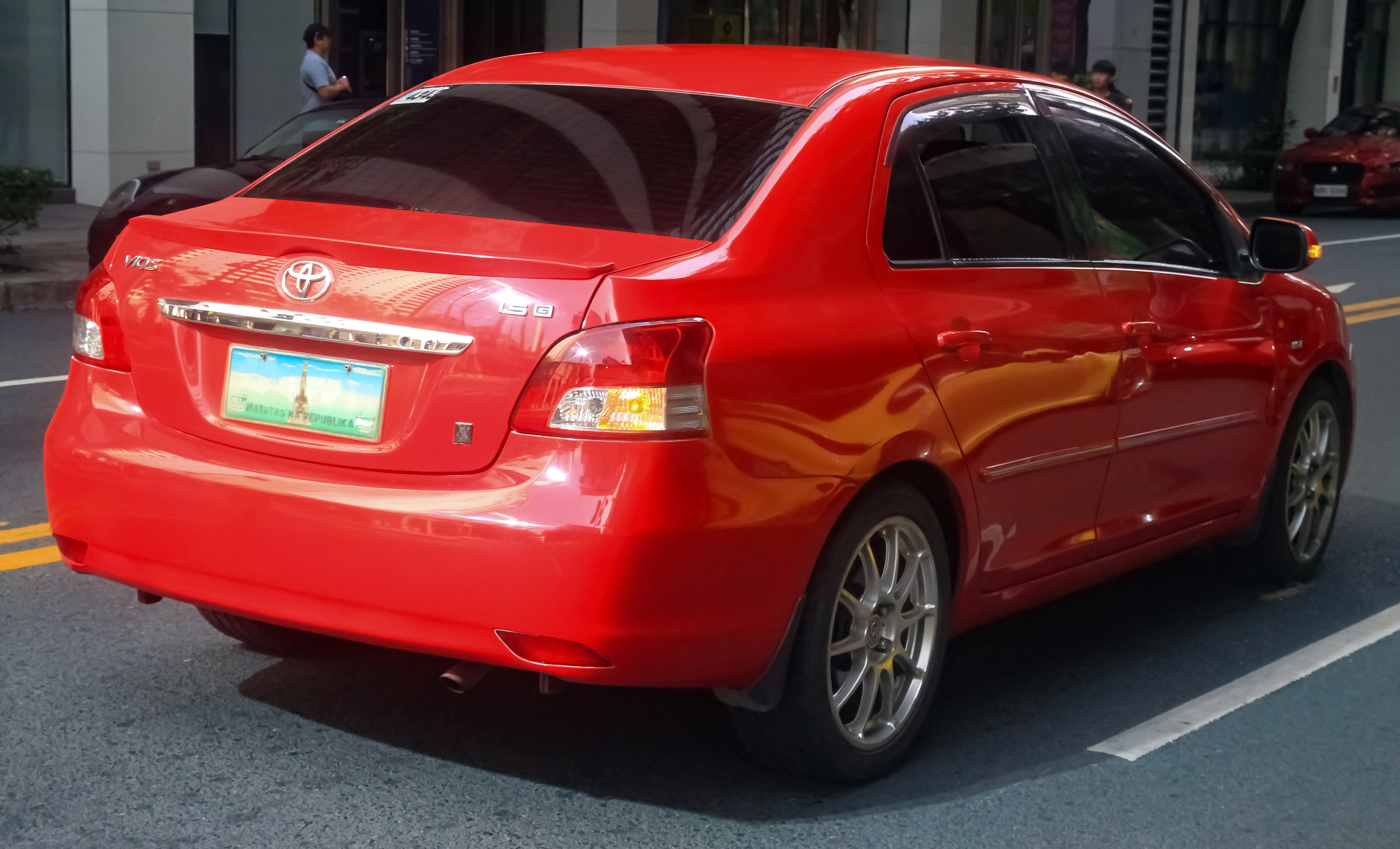
Pre-facelift Philippine market Toyota Vios G XX Limited (NCP93L)

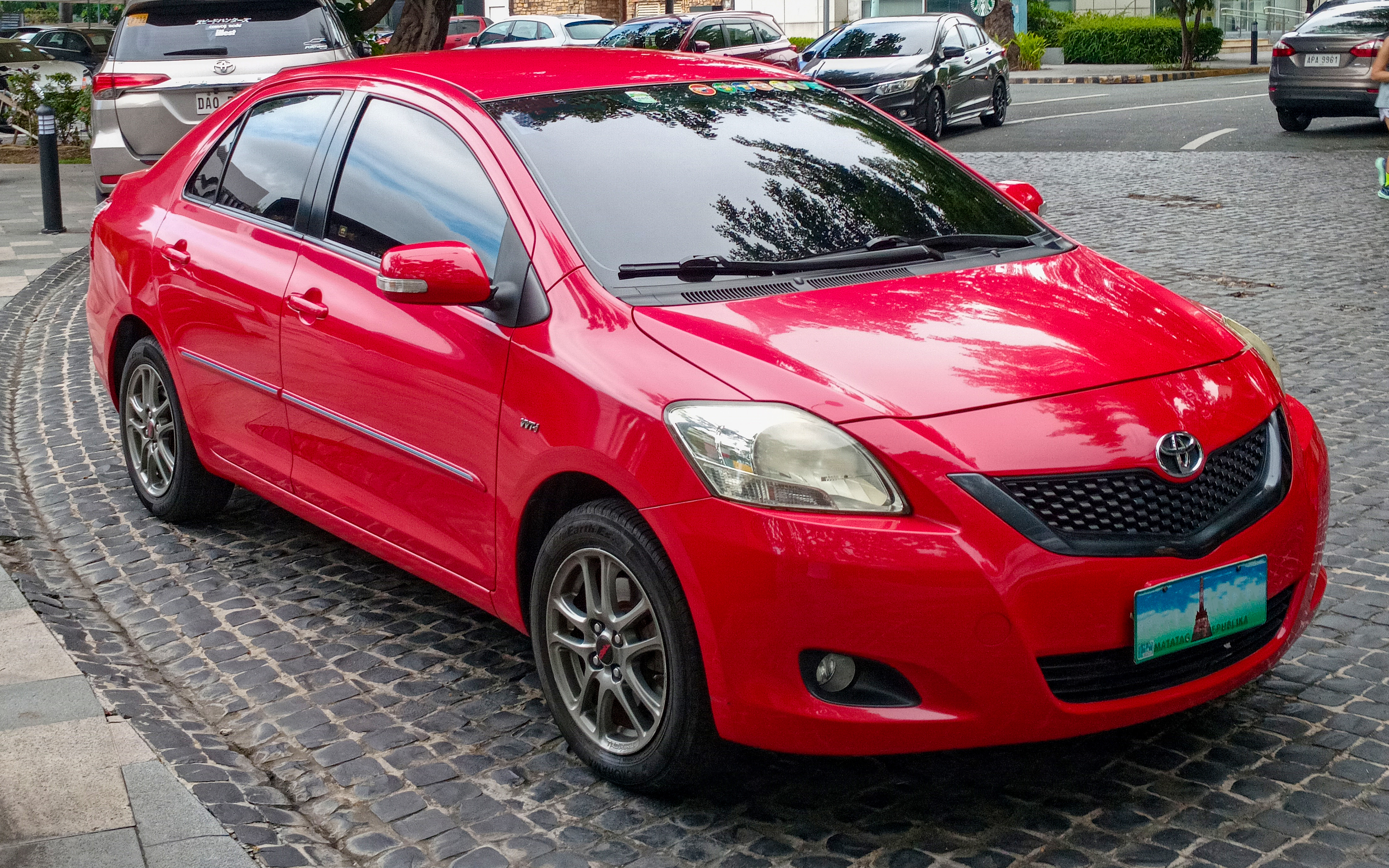
Facelifted Philippine market Toyota Vios G SE Limited (NCP93L)

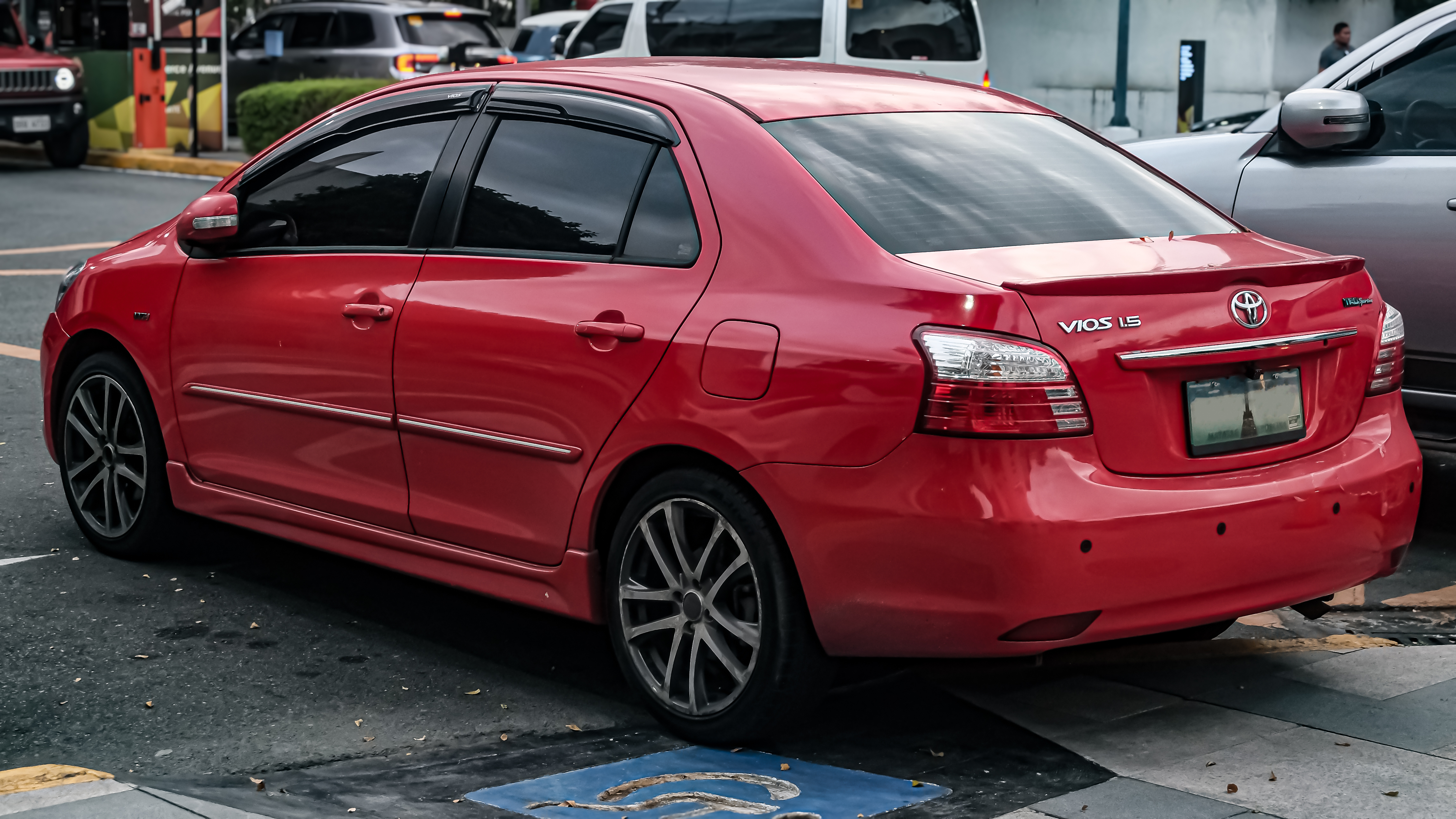
Facelifted Philippine market Toyota Vios TRD Sportivo (NCP93L)

===== Indonesia =====
The second generation Vios (and Limo) was officially launched to the Indonesian market in April 2007, imported from Thailand. The sedan was marketed with backronym "Very Intelligent, Outstanding Sedan!". Like the outgoing NCP42, the NCP93 Vios was offered in Limo (exclusively for taxi fleet), E and G trim levels and powered by the same 1.5 L 1NZ-FE engine. The Indonesian market Vios (excluding Limo) can be distinguished from other markets Vios with its V-shaped grille ornament.

The E and G trims come equipped with ABS with EBD and BA (2007–2008 model only for Limo), driver's side airbag, 2-DIN audio system, power window, window and power door lock and wing mirrors with electric adjuster and retract as standard. The highest grade G trim received more safety and convenience features such as passenger's side airbag, immobilizer, rear disc brake, rear parking sensor and keyless entry for the automatic transmission model. For the interior, both the Limo and E trims has full black interior color and additional power windows, power door and windows lock, fabric seat upholstery and door trim as standard for the latter. Meanwhile, the G trim has two tone black and beige colors combination plus additional leather wrapped steering wheel, audio control on the steering wheel, start/stop button for automatic transmission model, blue-colored optitron instrument cluster with multi-information display and 60:40 split back seat. For the exterior, the Limo can be distinguished by the use of 14-inch steel wheels, blinkers on the front fender, the lack of third stop light and unpainted door handles and trunk ornament. The middle E trim received V-shaped ornament on the front grille, side body moulding, blinkers on wing mirrors, body colored trunk ornament and 14-inch alloy wheels. The top of the line G trim added the front and rear fog lamps, auto-leveling HID headlamps, 15-inch alloy wheels, keyless entry button for the automatic transmission model and chrome ornament on the trunk.

The facelifted model was introduced in April 2010 and followed the same exterior appearance as the Southeast Asian and Chinese market. The interior is also slightly changed with the silver ornaments and new flat-bottom style steering wheel, black-beige interior for E trim, chrome gate shift for G automatic trim and back seat with armrest. The safety is also enhanced with automatic door lock for both trims and standard rear parking sensors for the E trim. In addition to the regular trim levels, there was also a TRD Sportivo model based on the G trim which adds an all-round body kit to the exterior and comes fitted with an AV DVD player and navigational capabilities. Another improvement was occurred in March 2012, this model can be identified by the use of smoked headlights for every trim (except Limo). Dual SRS airbags and 15-inch alloy wheels became standard for E trim. Meanwhile, the TRD Sportivo model was upgraded with additional trunk spoiler, TRD Sportivo sticker on the rear door and new sporty black interior. Despite these improvements, the Limo model did not receive any change until the discontinuation of this generation in 2013.

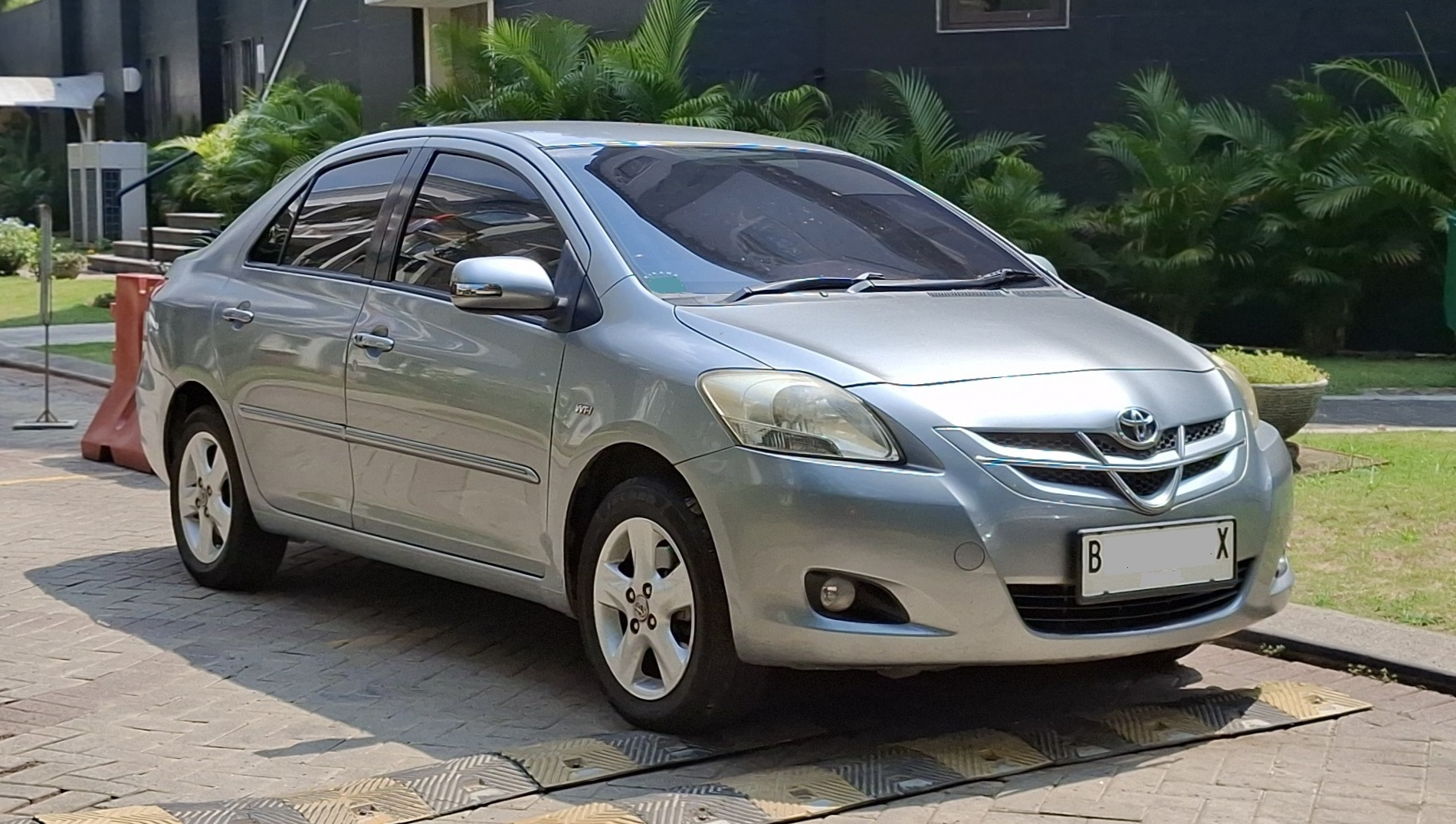
Pre-facelift Indonesian market Toyota Vios G (NCP93R) with unique "V" grille ornaments

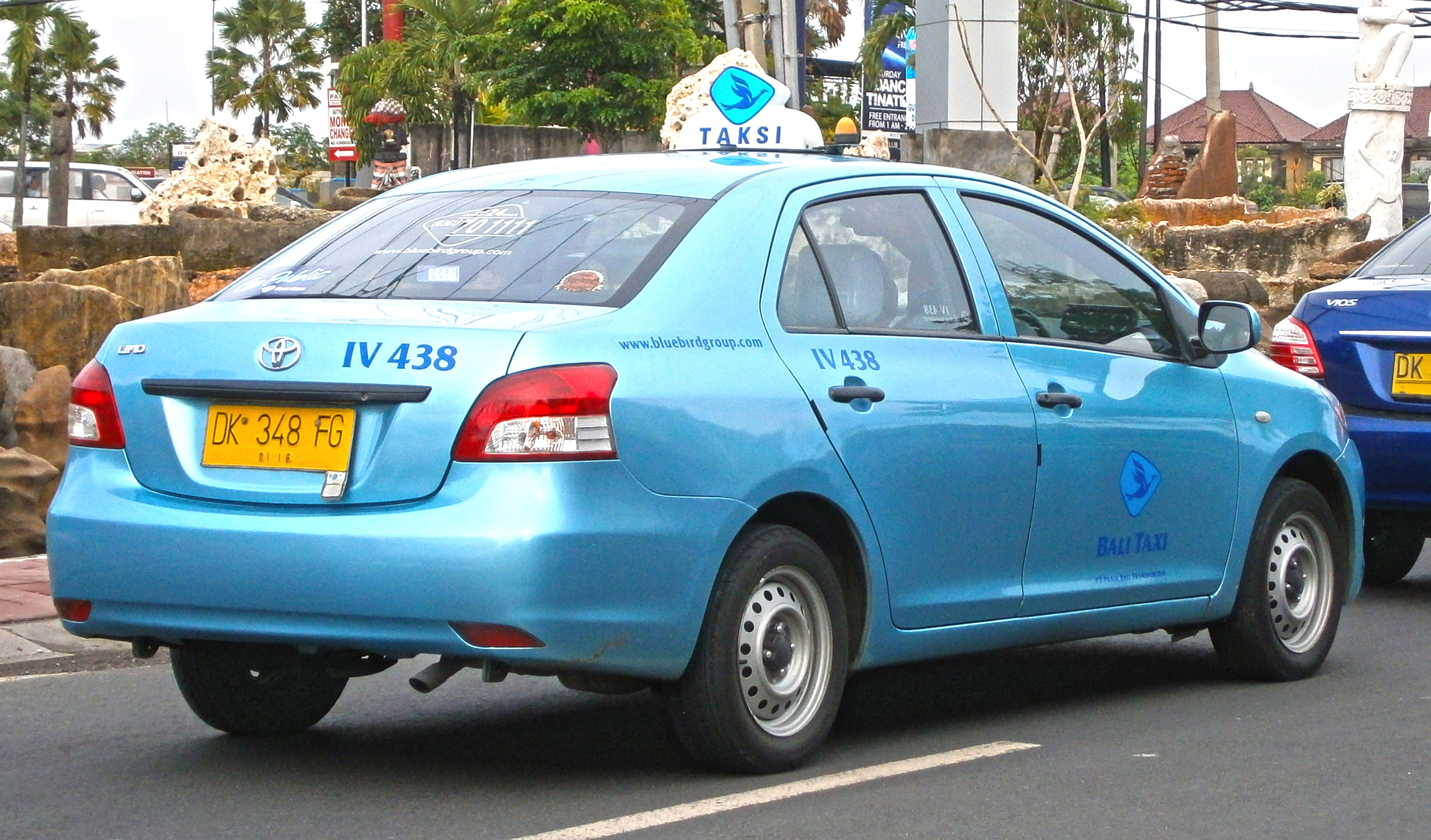
Indonesian market Toyota Limo (NCP93R), mostly sold for taxi fleet

===== Singapore =====
In Singapore, the Vios was sold in the base model J, the mid-level E and the top-of-the-line G trim levels, and later the TRD Sportivo model. All models have ABS with Electronic Brake Distribution (EBD) and Brake Assist (BA). As before, the sedan was sourced from Thailand.

Initially available with either manual or automatic gearbox, the J trim is the lowest version and comes standard with a CD/MP3/WMA player with 4 speakers, keyless entry, driver-only SRS airbag and interior fabric with dark grey colour seats.

The E trim is the only manual variant after the local dealer discontinued the manual J variant in Singapore. The E Classic includes an additional SRS airbag for the front passenger and side moulding. There is another variant of the E trim known as the Elegance that includes leather seats and fog lights.

The G trim is the top-of-the-line version available in Singapore and only came with an automatic transmission. The G has standard Optitron meters with multi-information display, steering wheel with audio switches, leather-wrapped steering wheel and gear knob, four-wheel disc brakes, and 60:40 split foldable rear seats.

Optional "Sport" and “Racing” bodykit were offered in late 2008 featuring aftermarket alloy wheels, red stitching on the leather seats and floor mats, gear knob, brushed studded pedals and badging to denote these models in its special run. These were available as optional extras by the Toyota dealership in Singapore (Borneo Motors). With the facelift in 2011, three colours were added – Grey Metallic (1G3), Attitude Black Mica (211) and Blackish Red Mica (3R0) – to make 7 colours in total. In December 2012, Borneo Motors (Singapore) introduced a "Sportivo" variant based on the E grade, consisting of a TRD sports kit and 15-inch TRD multi-spoke alloy wheels. Trims were also split into LX Classic and LX Elegance for the J and E variants. These were offered as a cost effective measure for customers who wanted the variant in base form or with extras such as leather seats, piano black interior trims and solar film. In 2013, only the E grade remained in the lineup for the Vios.

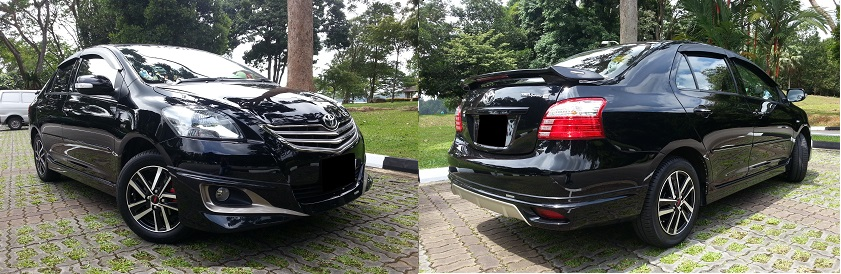
Facelifted Singaporean market Toyota Vios TRD Sportivo (NCP93R)

===== Thailand =====
In Thailand, the second generation Vios was offered in three trim levels; J, E and G, as well as two limited edition trim levels; G Limited and S Limited. Thailand was the only country that offers all existing grades of the Vios, while export markets are only given a fraction of the Thai range in varying combinations. In addition, certainly the range of equipment in Thai Vios' differs from those in export versions.

The J is the basic trim level of the second generation Vios offering a CD/MP3/WMA player with four speakers, an optional keyless entry with TVSS, ABS/EBD/BA, 15-inch steel wheels with hubcaps, rear fog lamps and interior fabric with dark grey colour seat, it is available with either 5-speed manual or 4-speed automatic transmissions.

The E is a mid-level trim featuring a keyless entry with TDS, an option between dark grey or ivory-coloured seat fabrics, optional dual SRS airbags, front and rear fog lamps, 15-inch sports alloy wheels and side moulding, it is available with either 5-speed manual or 4-speed automatic transmissions.

The G trim features an unchangeable 6 speaker CD/MP3/WMA player, leather seating in either dark grey or ivory, standard dual SRS airbags, a multi-functional steering wheel, 15-inch sports alloy wheels front and rear fog lamps, side moulding, a blue "Optitron" panel with a multi-information display and 60:40 fold-down rear seats with armrest, it is only available with 4-speed automatic transmissions.

The G Limited trim includes a keyless and smart entry with TDS, a Start/Stop push button, an immobilizer key and a body kit to the exterior.

The limited edition S Limited trim features a "Wrap-Around Aeropart" body kit, an orange "Optitron" panel with a multi-information display, HID headlamps with automatic height adjustment and all-wheel disc brakes.

Audio systems in all second generation Vios trim levels are equipped with ASL (Auto-Speed Sound Levelizer), which detects and compensates for changes in external noise levels, adjusting volume and tone controls automatically based on the car's speed.

In 2008, some of J and E trims features were downgraded. The J trim now comes with 14-inch steel wheels without hubcaps, the rear fog lights and driver's seat back pockets were also deleted. For the E trim, the driver's seat back pocket was also deleted, along with the deletion of dual SRS airbag option and turn signals on wing mirrors.

In March 2009, a limited edition called GT Street Version was introduced. The new model was based on the J trim with additional all-around body kits, trunk spoiler, 15-inch alloy wheels from XP90 Yaris, automatic transmission, exhaust pipe with stainless steel cover, body stickers, leather-wrapped steering wheel, sport seat and red-black dual tone interior. It was only available for 1,000 units.

In 2010 facelift, the J trim received immobilizer system, new steering wheel design for trims above J and the introduction of ES trim based on the E trim but equipped with dual airbags and automatic only. TRD Sportivo model was later released as the successor of GT Street edition. Still based on the J trim, it was limited to 3,000 units. Another 4,200 units of TRD Sportivo model was released in October 2011, the new version received new 15-inch alloy wheels.

Final changes were released in late 2012 with the standard dual SRS airbag and blacked headlights reflector for every trims. The steering wheel for E trim was reverted to the original model. The third version of the TRD Sportivo model was released again in September, for another 4,100 units, with upgraded body kits, new alloy wheels design, and new orange interior accent.

The second generation Vios has been campaigned in One Make Races in Bangkok.

==== China ====
The second generation Vios was introduced to China in February 2008. Engine choices for Chinese market consist of the 1.3 L 2NZ-FE and the exclusive 1.6 L Dual VVT-i 1ZR-FE from the E150 series Corolla. 5-speed manual and 4-speed automatic are available as standard for both engines. A factory fitted sunroof option is also available exclusively for this market.

Mainland China Vios trim levels include:

- 1.3 GL-i: base model with 1.3 L engine and basic features. Renamed to 1.3 GL-i Standard in 2010 facelift and the new 1.3 GL-i was upgraded with standard alloy wheels.
- 1.6 GL-i: added alloy wheels, front fog lights and electric folding wing mirrors. Side body mouldings, wing mirrors with turn signals and electric sunroof were added for special edition models.
- 1.6 GL-S: sporty version of 1.6 GL-i with body kits, trunk spoiler, LED third stop lamp, higher quality seat upholstery and amber instrument cluster.
- 1.6 GLX-i: luxury version of 1.6 GL-i with electric sunroof, chrome door handles, side body mouldings, wing mirrors with turn signals, blue optitron instrument cluster (changed to amber in 2010 facelift), higher quality seat upholstery and 6 speakers.

Lifan made a copy of Vios with different front and rear fascia and marketed as the 530. It was also rebadged and sold in Ghana as Kantanka Amoanimaa.

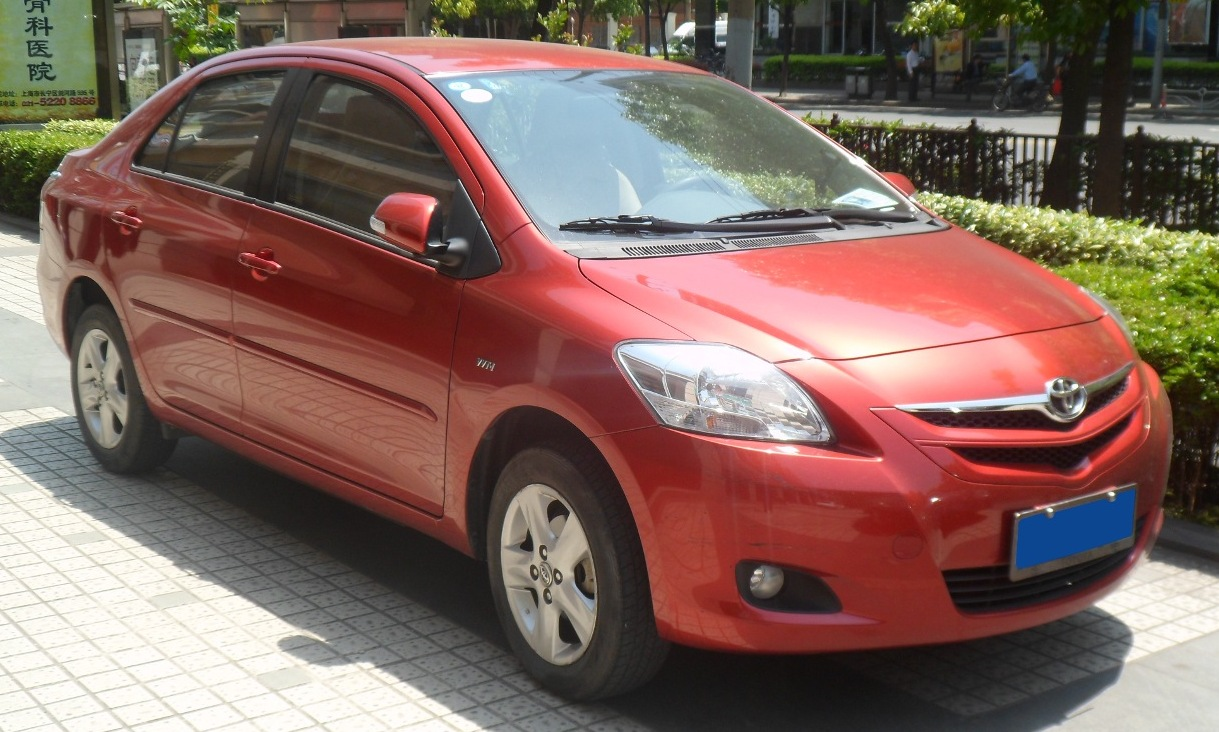
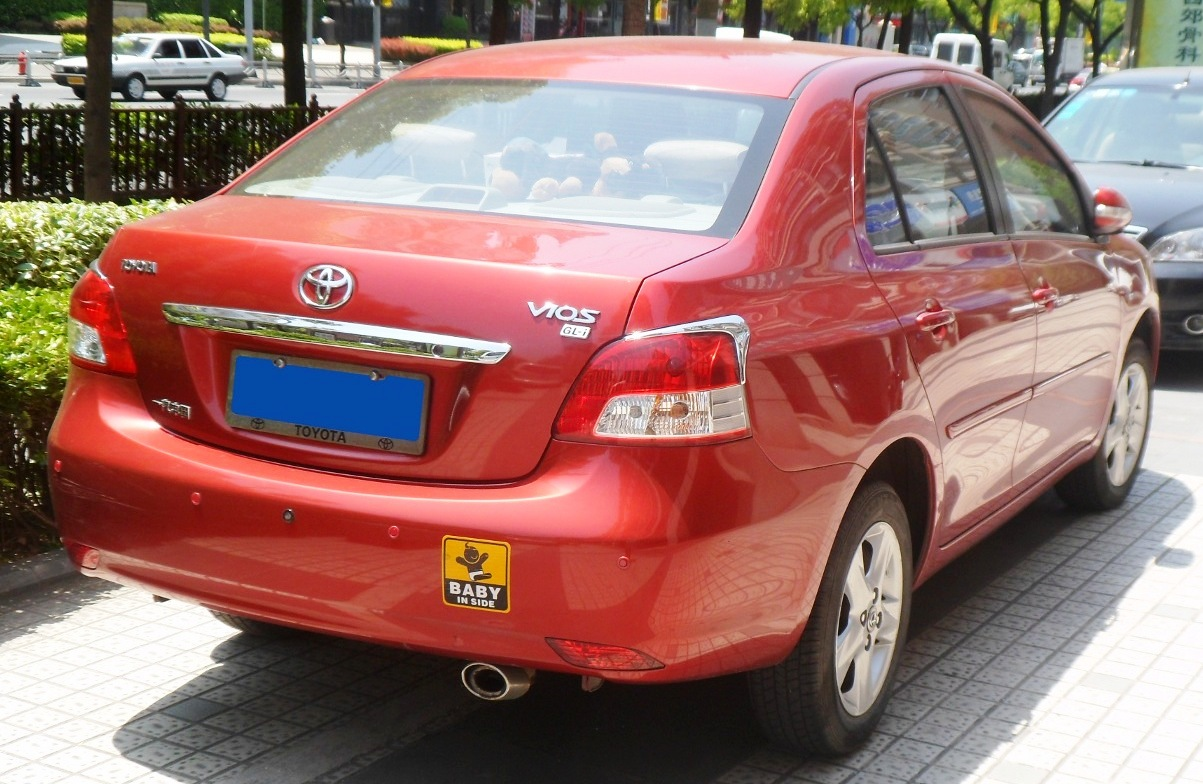
Pre-facelift Chinese market Toyota Vios GL-i Commemorative Edition with optional chrome decorative (ZSP92L)

=== North America ===
The Belta went on sale in North America in March 2006 for the 2007 model year, being badged as the Yaris sedan, since these markets use the Yaris nameplate for the 3-door (last model year of availability there was 2008) and 5-door Vitz hatchbacks (marketed as Yaris "liftback"), respectively.

In the United States, the Yaris sedan is available with modular convenience, power, and all-weather guard packages, contrasting with the global Belta's conventional trim levels. However, the Yaris sedan was also available as the Yaris S, which has standard convenience package and all-around body kit. The power package on the Yaris sedan offers alloy wheels, power windows, power door locks, power mirrors, ABS with EBD, cruise control and several convenience features as option. Side airbags, TRD 18-inch alloy wheels, suspension kits and others accessories were also available as separate option.

The Canadian version is being based on the US-market Yaris S with power and all-weather guard packages, but with standard 14-inch (360 mm) wheels. The regular CE, LE and RS trims used in the Canadian Yaris hatchback are replaced in the Yaris sedan by option packages of B, C, D or Aero types. The B adds 15-inch all-season tires, chrome trim on the decklid, front and rear splash guards, colour-keyed door handles, blacked-out side window frames, keyless entry and power door locks; the C adds ABS, air conditioning, power windows, colour-keyed mirrors and power mirrors; the D adds both side and side-curtain airbags; the Aero adds alloy wheels, wheel locks, a rear spoiler and a body kit. The Aero, however, has neither air conditioning nor side airbags. The Canadian model lacks the two-tone interior, pseudo-metallic trim on the door panels and the new audio system controls (instead it uses an old design) found on the Japanese and American models.

For Mexican market, the sedan was sold with a combination of North American market and general export markets specifications.

The 2007 Yaris sedan received EPA fuel economy ratings of 40 mpg_{‑US} (17.0 km/L) on the highway and 34 mpg_{‑US} (14.5 km/L) in the city, with a fuel capacity of 42 L (11.1 US gal). However, because the EPA changed the way they calculate fuel economy, ratings were revised for the 2008 model year and the Yaris was rated at 29 mpg_{‑US} (12.3 km/L) city/36 mpg_{‑US} (15.3 km/L) mpg highway for the manual transmission, and 29 mpg_{‑US} (12.3 km/L) mpg city/35 mpg_{‑US} (14.9 km/L) mpg highway for the automatic version.

For the 2009 model year which was a facelift, all Yaris sedans received updated styling with a new grille, alloy designs, interior fabric, standard side curtain airbags and anti-lock brakes. There are also options such as a leather-wrapped steering wheel/shift knob and satellite radio. The TRD options were also expanded with additional rear sway bar, clutch assembly for manual transmission and many more.

While the hatchback was replaced by the XP130 series Yaris in 2011, the sedan was continued to be on sale until it was replaced by Mazda2-based Scion iA/Yaris sedan in summer 2015. However, the sedan was sold alongside the newer Yaris R sedan in Mexico up to April 2016, until it was succeeded by the XP150 series Yaris sedan two months later.

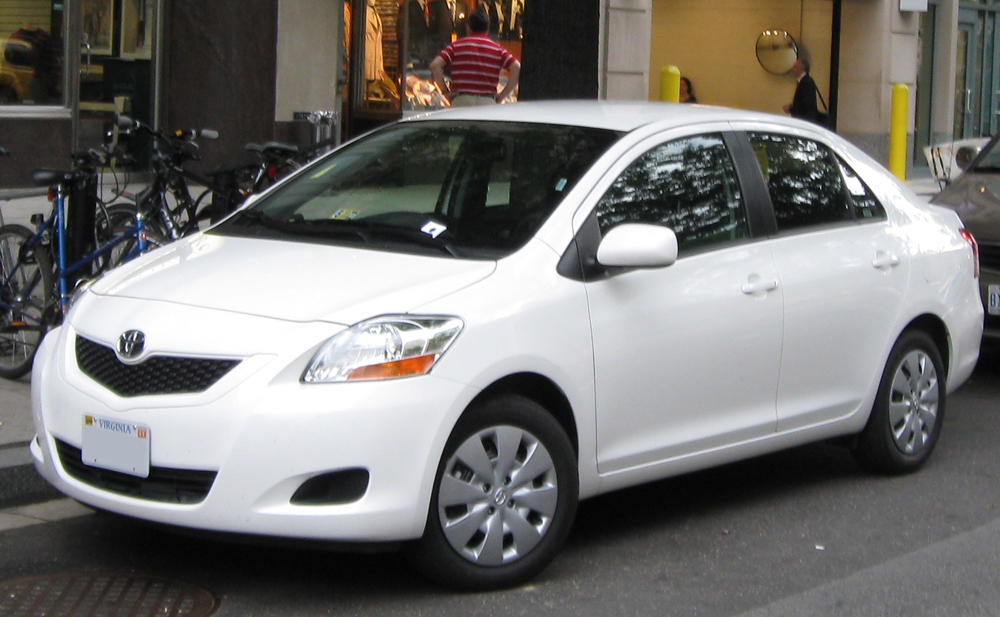
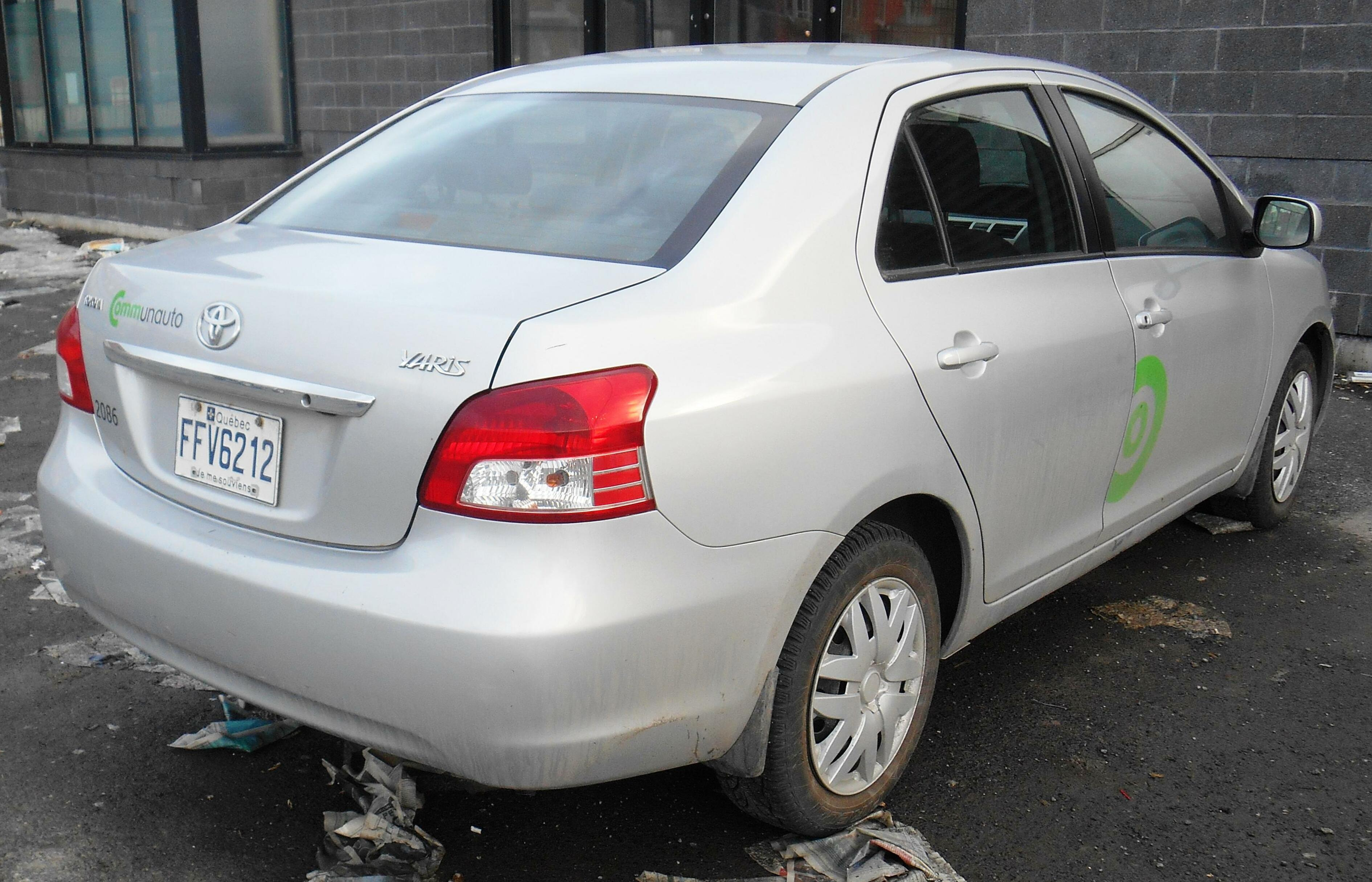
Canadian and US markets Toyota Yaris sedan equipped with amber front and red rear side marker lights and reflectors

=== Australia ===
In Australia, it is known as the Yaris sedan and was sold alongside the Vitz-based Yaris hatchback. The Yaris sedan was available only in a 1.5 L 1NZ-FE petrol engine. There were two variants of the model, namely the YRS and YRX, with the former being the model with the basic necessities. The YRX model features an all-round body kit and was available in an automatic transmission or 5-speed manual transmission. The facelift model was introduced in October 2008 with the same appearance based on the international model and several minor revision.

At the end of 2016, the Australian version Yaris sedan was discontinued due to poor sales with over 27 percent drop. It was then phased out with no direct replacement for the Australian market.

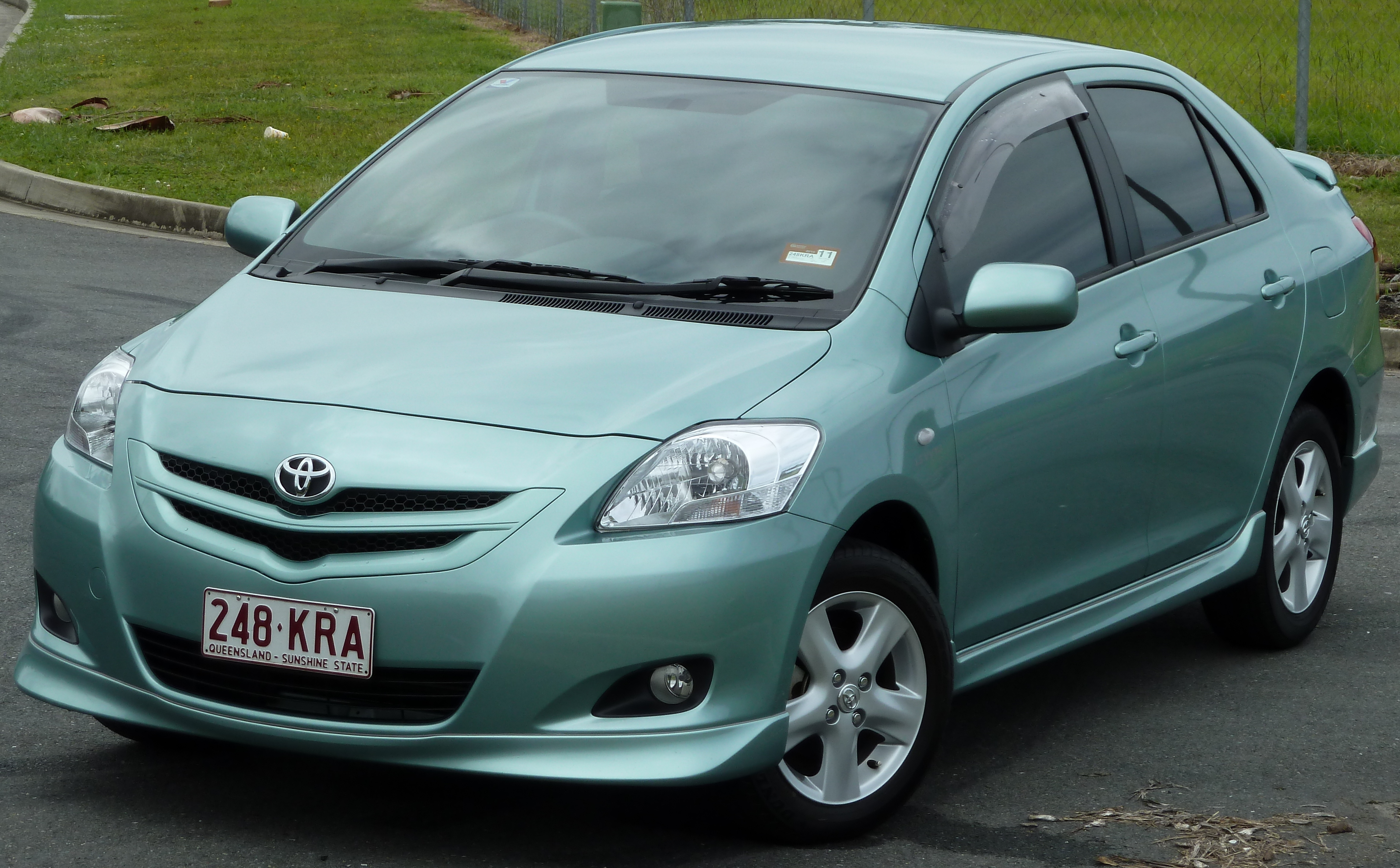
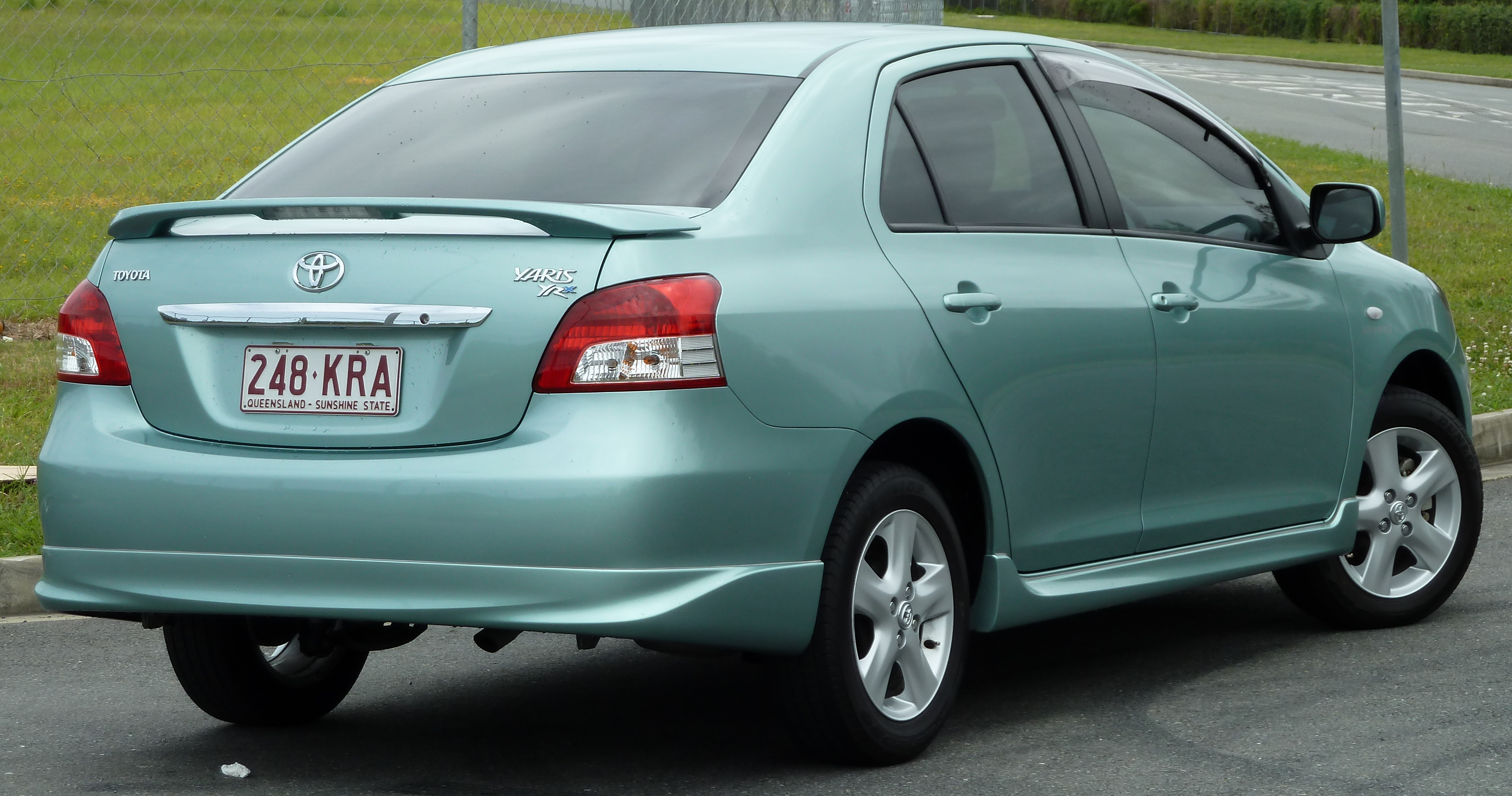
Pre-facelift Australian market Toyota Yaris YRX sedan (NCP93R)

== Powertrain ==
The Japanese market Belta retains the 1.3 L 2NZ-FE engine for its all-wheel drive model, similar to the Platz. However, the 1.5 L 1NZ-FE engine is not available for the Belta. Instead, two new engines are offered exclusively for this market: the straight-three 1.0 L 1KR-FE engine, which replaces the older inline-four 1.0 L 1SZ-FE engine, and the additional 1.3 L 2SZ-FE engine. These new engines were co-developed with Daihatsu and are only available with a CVT and front-wheel drive.

As for the Yaris sedan and Vios, it retained the same 1.3 L 2NZ-FE and 1.5 L 1NZ-FE engines from their predecessors. A non-VVTi version of the smaller engine is also available for markets that still use leaded petrol. In some markets where the Corolla was offered with 1.4–1.5 L engine options, only the 1.3 L 2NZ-FE engine was offered to avoid cannibalizing the Corolla's market share. The 5-speed C-series manual transmissions were also changed from C150/154 to the newer C50/54, while the 4-speed U441E and U340E automatic transmissions were retained, with the latter now requiring low-viscosity ATF-WS automatic transmission fluid type instead of ATF-IV.

In China, the base model Vios is powered by a 1.3 L 2NZ-FE engine just like the international model, which uniquely replaced the 2SZ-FE engine. The higher model, however, boasts a bigger 1.6 L 1ZR-FE Dual VVT-i engine from Corolla, rather than the 1.5 L 1NZ-FE unit.

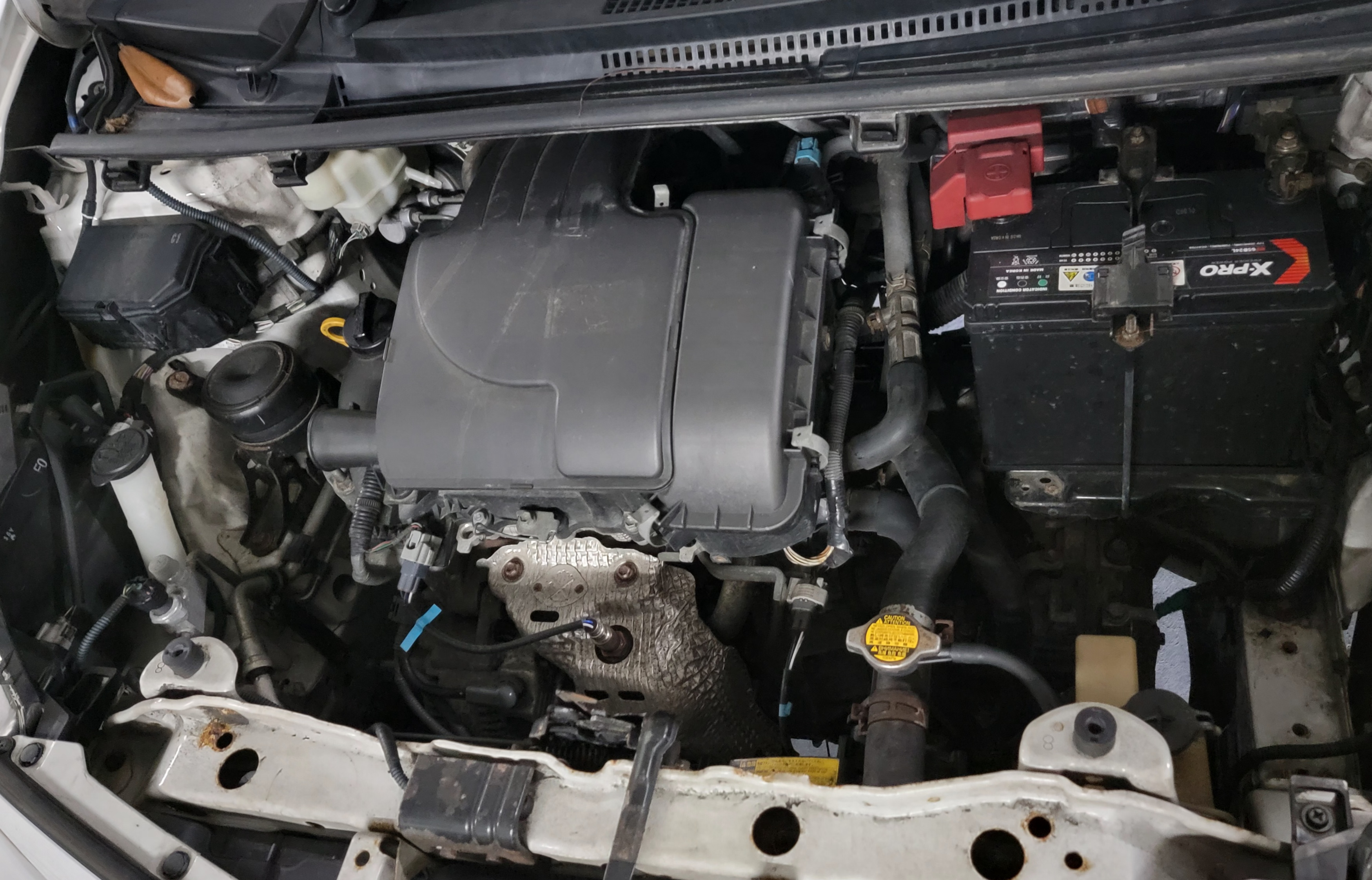
1.0 L 1KR-FE engine

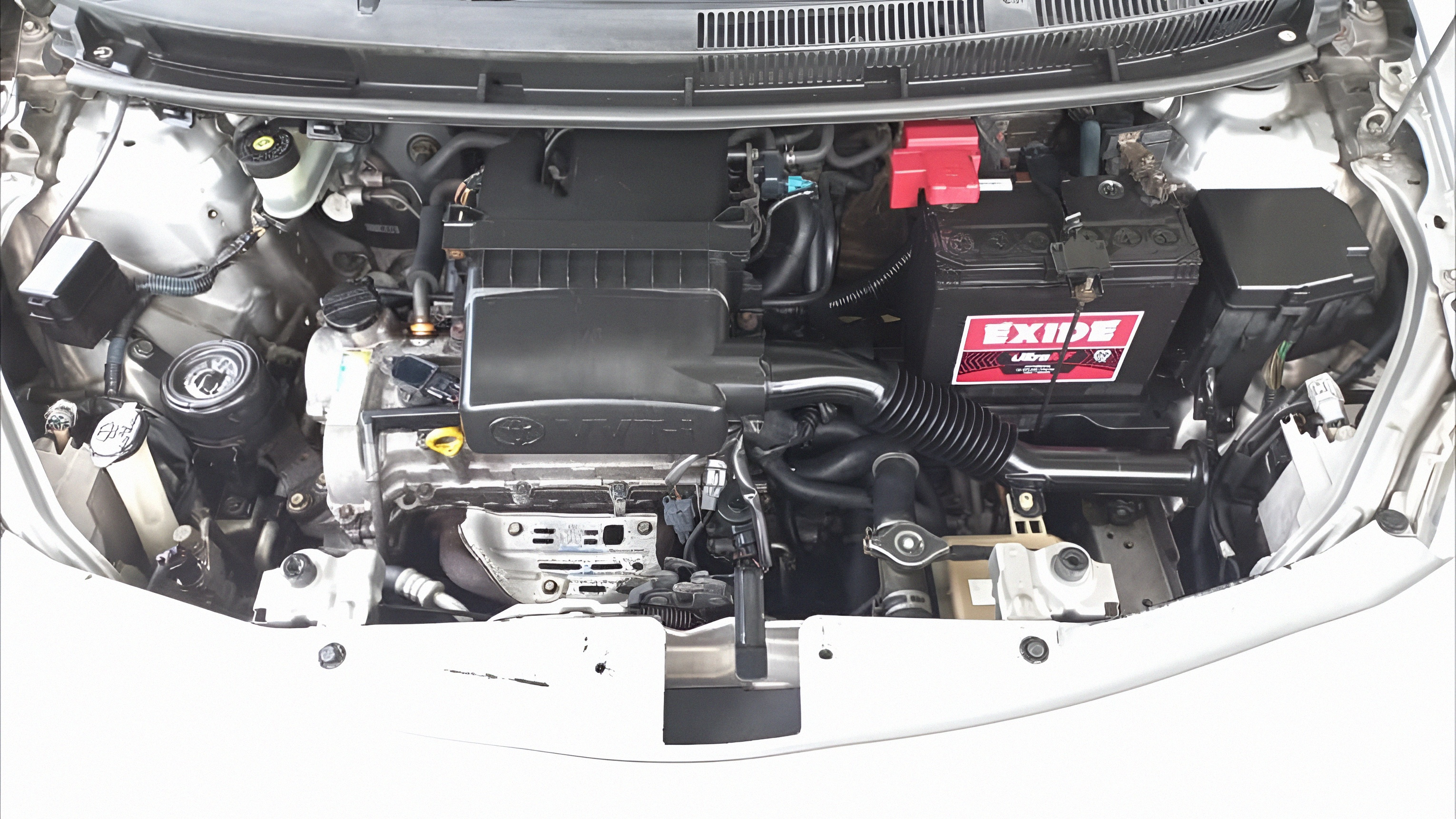
1.3 L 2SZ-FE engine

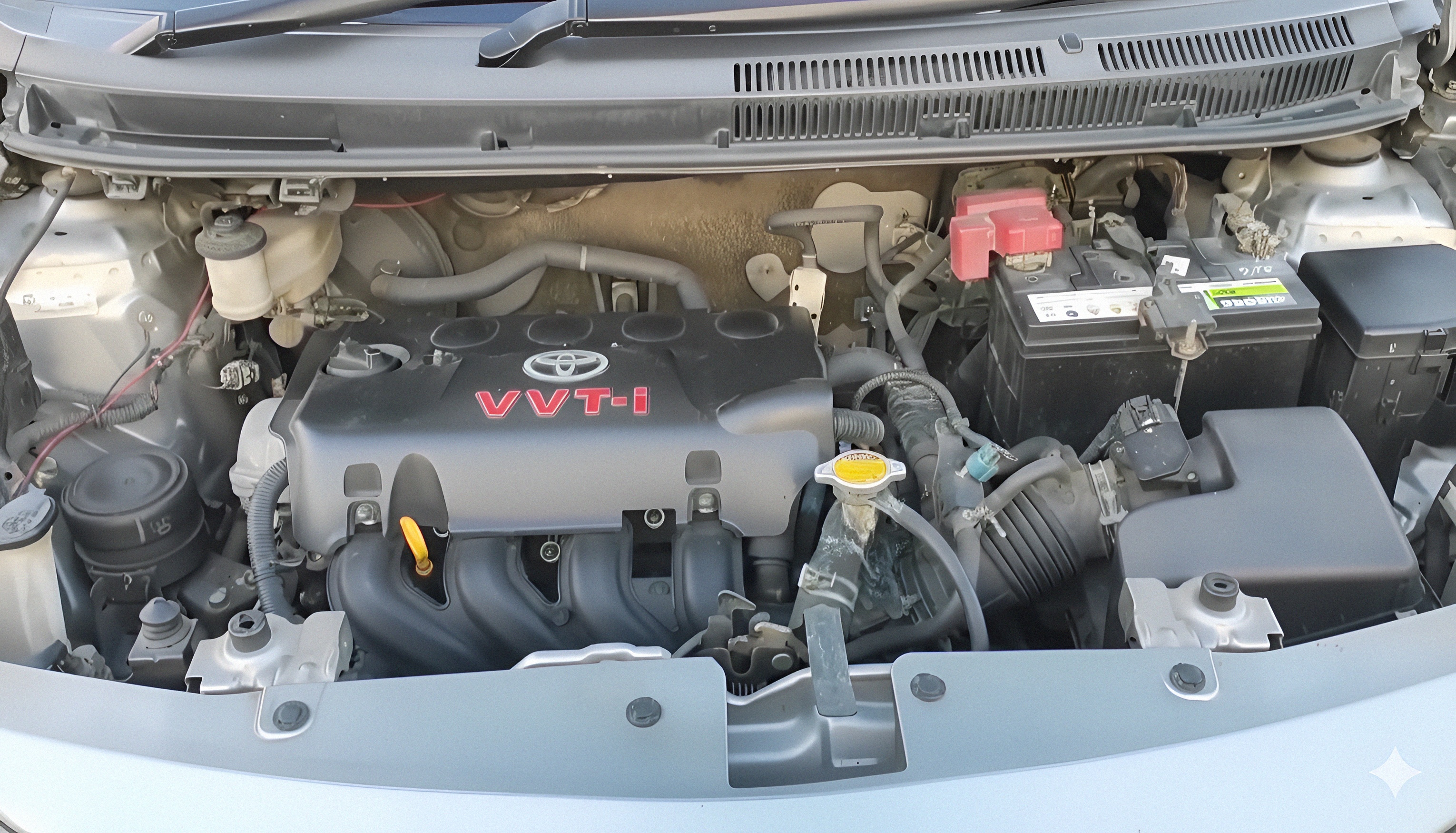
1.5 L 1NZ-FE engine (similar to the 1.3 L 2NZ-FE)

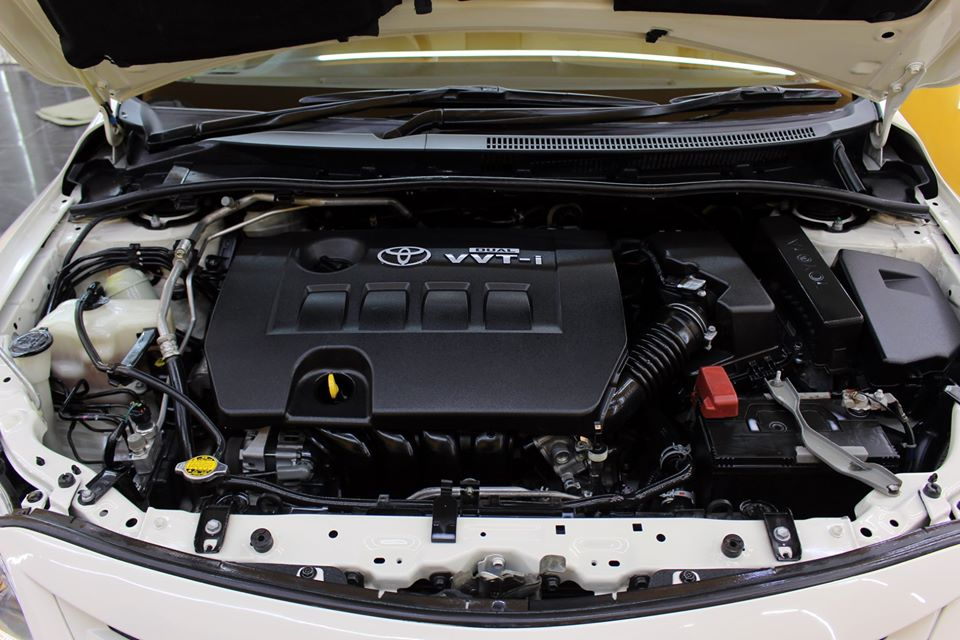
1.6 L 1ZR-FE engine

Code	Engine	Power	Torque	Transmission	Market
KSP92	997 cc (1.0 L); 1KR-FE I3	71 PS (52 kW; 70 hp) at 6,000 rpm	94 N⋅m (69 lb⋅ft; 10 kg⋅m) at 3,600 rpm	K410 CVT	Japan
SCP92	1,298 cc (1.3 L); 2SZ-FE I4	87 PS (64 kW; 86 hp) at 6,000 rpm	116 N⋅m (86 lb⋅ft; 12 kg⋅m) at 4,000 rpm	K410 CVT	Japan
NCP92	1,298 cc (1.3 L); 2NZ-FE I4	86 PS (63 kW; 85 hp) at 6,000 rpm	122 N⋅m (90 lb⋅ft; 12 kg⋅m) at 4,400 rpm	5-speed C54 manual 4-speed U441E automatic	Africa, China, Latin America, Middle East and Philippines
NCP96 (all-wheel drive)	1,298 cc (1.3 L); 2NZ-FE I4	87 PS (64 kW; 86 hp) at 6,000 rpm	120 N⋅m (89 lb⋅ft; 12 kg⋅m) at 4,400 rpm	4-speed U441F automatic	Japan
NCP93	1,497 cc (1.5 L); 1NZ-FE I4	107 PS (79 kW; 106 hp) at 6,000 rpm (North America) 109 PS (80 kW; 108 hp) at 6,000 rpm	139 N⋅m (103 lb⋅ft; 14 kg⋅m) at 4,200 rpm (North America) 142 N⋅m (105 lb⋅ft; 14 kg⋅m) at 4,200 rpm	5-speed C50 manual (North America and Southeast Asia) 5-speed C54 manual 4-speed U340E automatic	Americas, Asia and Australasia
ZSP92	1,598 cc (1.6 L); 1ZR-FE I4	118 PS (87 kW; 116 hp) at 6,000 rpm	150 N⋅m (111 lb⋅ft; 15 kg⋅m) at 4,400 rpm	5-speed C50 manual 4-speed U340E automatic	China

=== Performance ===
North American specifications with 106 hp (79 kW; 107 PS) 1.5 L engine and 4-speed automatic transmission.

- 0–60 mph (0–97 km/h) acceleration:
  - MotorWeek: 9.5 seconds
  - Motor Trend: 10.4 seconds
- 1/4 mile (402 m) time:
  - MotorWeek: 17.4 seconds at 80 mph (129 km/h)
  - Motor Trend: 17.8 seconds at 76.8 mph (124 km/h)
- 60–0 mph (97–0 km/h) braking distance (front disc/rear drum, with ABS):
  - MotorWeek: 125 ft (38 m)
  - Motor Trend: 129 ft (39 m)
- Passing, 45–65 mph (72–105 km/h):
  - Motor Trend: 5.6 seconds
- Fuel economy (mixed):
  - MotorWeek: 36 mpg_{‑US} (15.3 km/l)
  - MotorTrend: 36.4 mpg_{‑US} (15.5 km/l)

Indonesian market Toyota Vios, 109 PS (80 kW; 108 hp) 1.5 L engine and 4-speed automatic transmission.

- 0–100 km/h (0–62 mph) acceleration: 11.4 seconds (10.6 seconds for manual)
- Fuel consumption (mixed): 14.7 km/l (34.6 mpg_{‑US})

== Safety ==
=== Japan ===
Standard safety features for Japanese market Belta include dual airbags, front seatbelt pretensioners and anti-lock braking system (ABS) with electronic brakeforce distribution (EBD) and brake assist (BA). However, it could be enhanced with optional side airbags, electronic stability control (ESC) and rear disc brake.

JNCAP crash test rating:

Test	Results
Frontal driver	6/6 stars
Frontal passenger	6/6 stars
Pedestrian	3/5

=== United States ===
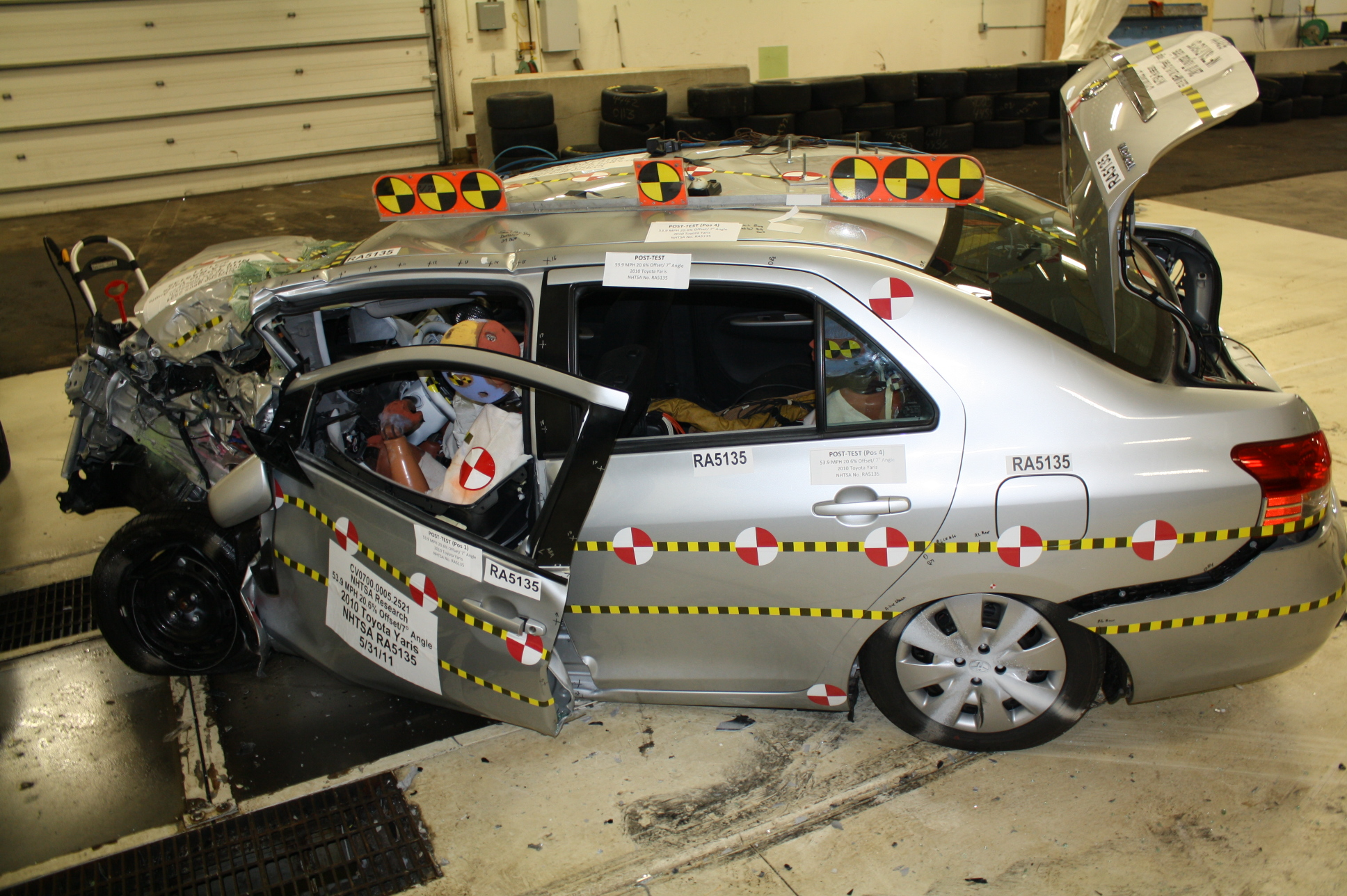
A Toyota Yaris sedan crash tested by NHTSA

Standard safety features include airbags, front seatbelt pretensioners, and head restraints for all seating positions. Side airbags and ABS are optional on 2007–2008 models. Beginning in 2009, front and rear row side curtain airbags along with front seat-mounted torso side airbags and ABS became standard. ESC was unavailable on all models until the 2010 model year when it became standard.

According to the US Insurance Institute for Highway Safety (IIHS) the Yaris sedan received a "Good" overall score in the frontal crash test and a "Good" overall score in the side impact test on models equipped with side airbags but a "Poor" overall score on models without side airbags. In their roof strength evaluation the Yaris is rated "Acceptable" with a strength-to-weight ratio of 3.78.

Frontal Offset Test
Structure/safety cage		Good
Injury measures	Head/neck	Acceptable
Injury measures	Chest	Good
Injury measures	Leg/foot, left	Good
Injury measures	Leg/foot, right	Good
Injury measures	Restraints/dummy kinematics	Good
Overall Evaluation		Good

Side Impact Test
Test		Without side airbags		With side airbags	
Structure/safety cage		Acceptable		Acceptable	
Injury measures (front/rear occupant)	Head/neck	Poor	Good	Good	Good
Injury measures (front/rear occupant)	Torso	Marginal	Good	Good	Good
Injury measures (front/rear occupant)	Pelvis/leg	Acceptable	Good	Good	Good
Injury measures (front/rear occupant)	Head protection	Poor	Marginal	Good	Good
Overall Evaluation		Poor		Good	

U.S. National Highway Traffic Safety Administration (NHTSA) Yaris sedan crash test ratings:

Test	2008 MY, no side airbags	2009 MY, with side airbags
Frontal driver	5/5 stars	5/5 stars
Frontal passenger	5/5 stars	5/5 stars
Side driver	3/5 stars	4/5 stars
Side rear passenger	3/5 stars	4/5 stars
Rollover	4/5 stars	4/5 stars

=== Southeast Asia ===
Depending on the trim level, the sedan could be optioned with dual airbags, front seatbelt pretensioners, ABS with EBD and BA and all-wheels disc brake in this region. ESC, three-point seatbelt and head rest for passenger in the middle of second row were not available as option for this region.

ASEAN NCAP test results Toyota Vios (2012)
Test	Points	Stars
Adult occupant:	13.61	4 /5 stars
Child occupant:	48%	0 /5 stars
Safety assist:	NA	

=== China ===
The safety features for this market are very similar to the Southeast Asian market Vios. However, it is available with optional side airbags and without rear disc brake option.

C-NCAP test result:

Test	Score
Full frontal	12.740/16
40% frontal	15.290/16
Side impact	16.000/16
Whiplash	0.000/5
Bonus points	3.000/5
Points	47.030/58
Result	5/5 stars

=== Recalls ===
The Belta, Vios and Yaris sedan produced between 2005 and 2013 were also affected by the Takata's defective airbag scandal. The explosion of front passenger airbag inflator may result in sharp metal fragments striking the driver or other occupants resulting in serious injury or death.

Problems on the driver's side power window due the lack of grease that may causing the contact point to wear out early or melting and seat rails may break in the event of a collision have also been reported in Japan and the United States. Another recalls for the Japanese market Belta were issued in 2009, affecting models produced between 17 November 2005 and 7 April 2008, due to issues with the exhaust gas recirculation (EGR) system pipe in KSP92 and SCP92 models that may crack due the heat and the front seatbelt pretensioners may cause a fire during a collision. Additional recalls were also issued in March 2015 in the United States and Puerto Rico for certain model year 2012–2015 Yaris vehicles manufactured from 31 August 2011 to 9 February 2015. The affected vehicles may have been manufactured with a roof headliner that does not provide the proper occupant protection in the event of a crash.

== Sales and production ==
According to Toyota production data, over 1 million Belta and export market Yaris sedans were produced in Japan from 2005 to 2012, with around 134,000 of them being sold as Belta. The sales of Belta was discontinued in 2012, while export market Yaris sedan continued up to 2016 in Australia and Mexico. Over 1 million of second generation Vios (and Indonesian market Limo) were also produced and sold in China and Southeast Asia from 2007 to 2014. Approximately, the total global sales and production of Belta and its derivatives were less than 2.5 million units.

Sales data (Note: The sales data of Vios/Limo in 2007 (2008 for China) were mixed with the first generation model, while 2013 data (2014 for Vietnam) were mixed with the third generation model.)
Year	Japan	China	Thailand	Philippines	Vietnam	Malaysia (Note: Figures based on registration)	Indonesia (Note: Figures based on wholesale)		Mexico
Year	Belta	Vios						Limo	Yaris sedan
2005	>134,000								
2006	>134,000								<7,558 (Note: Mixed with the older model)
2007	>134,000		<45,032	<8,717	<2,112	<7,314	<5,474	<2,660	8,098
2008	>134,000	<36,865	45,298	12,020	3,122	32,613	6,098	5,103	8,161
2009	>134,000	42,675	49,510	11,990	5,141	29,444	2,722	4,576	5,754
2010	>134,000	34,689	67,304	15,391	5,807	33,623	4,305	7,518	4,452
2011	>134,000	13,303	61,985	14,979	5,401	29,850	2,525	6,850	2,874
2012	>134,000	9,130	115,934	16,517	4,207	31,254	3,122	10,938	2,165
2013		<28,616	<108,937	<20,493	5,140	<19,068	<3,115	<9,582	1,404
2014					<959				5,354
2015									9,537
2016									5,210

== Suzuki Ciaz-based model ==
The "Belta" nameplate was revived in November 2021 for the rebadged Suzuki Ciaz sold in Africa. It was discontinued in the first half of 2025 without a replacement.

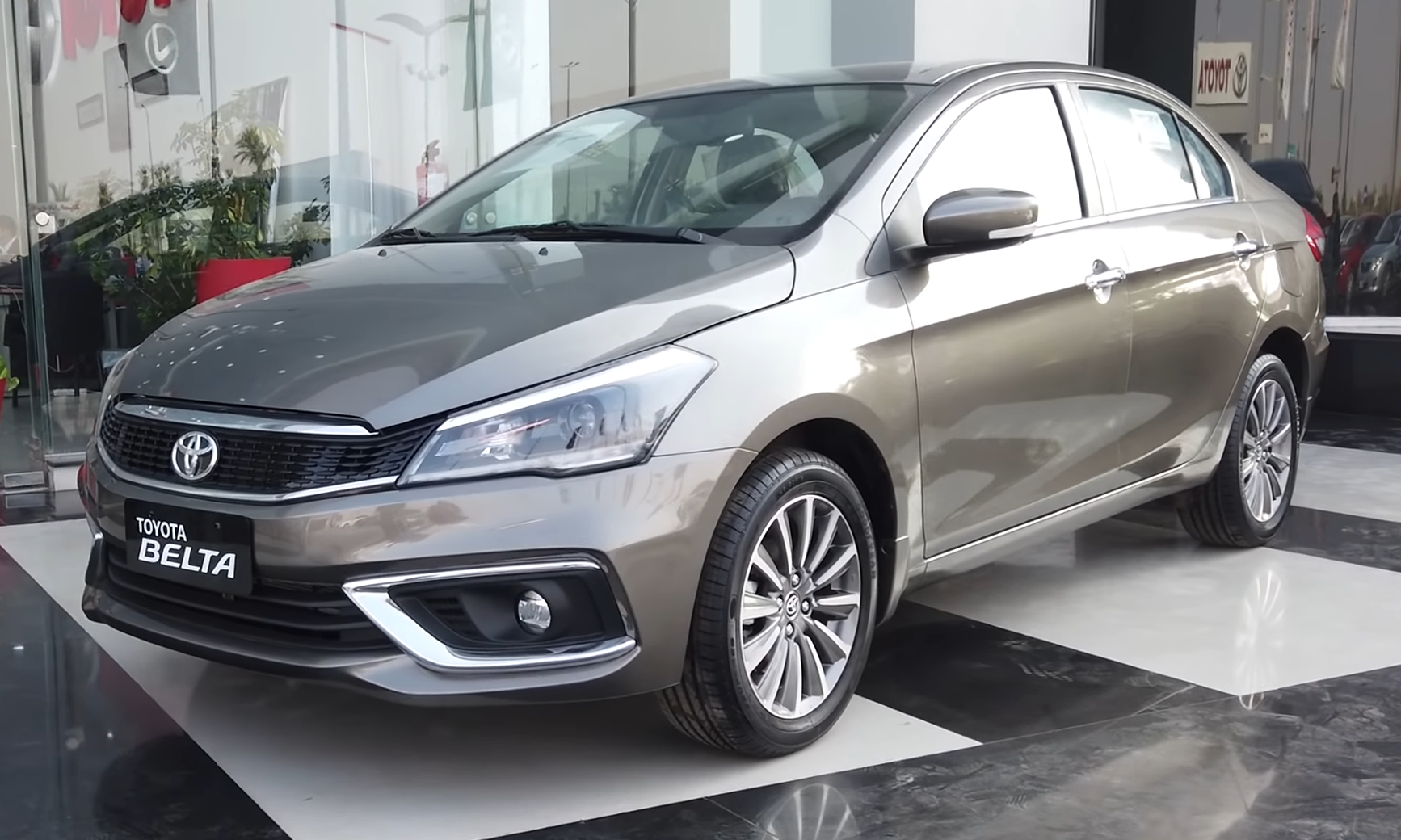
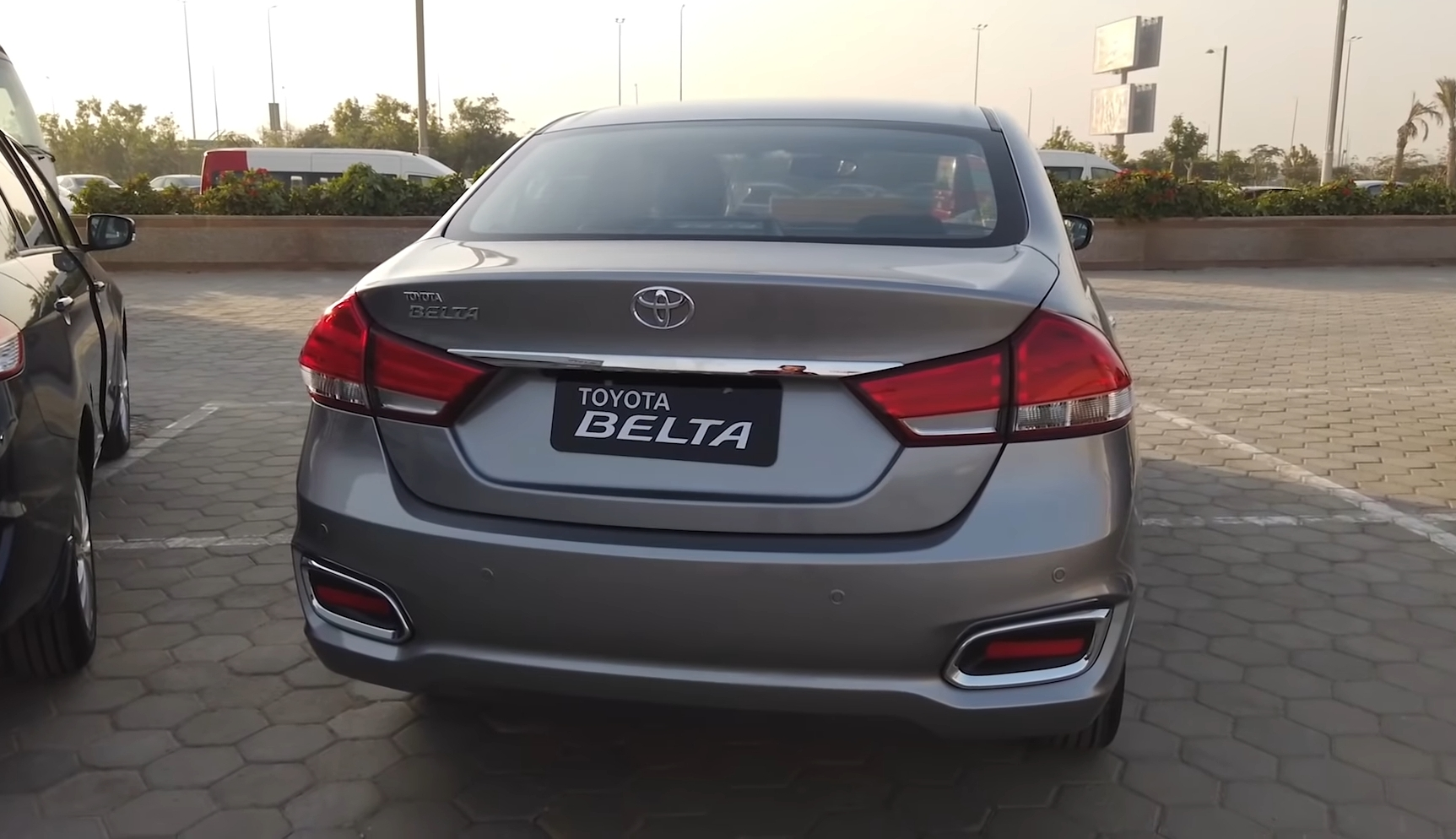
African market 2021–2025 Belta

== See also ==
- List of Toyota vehicles
