= Toyota Succeed =

Toyota Succeed (XP50/160)
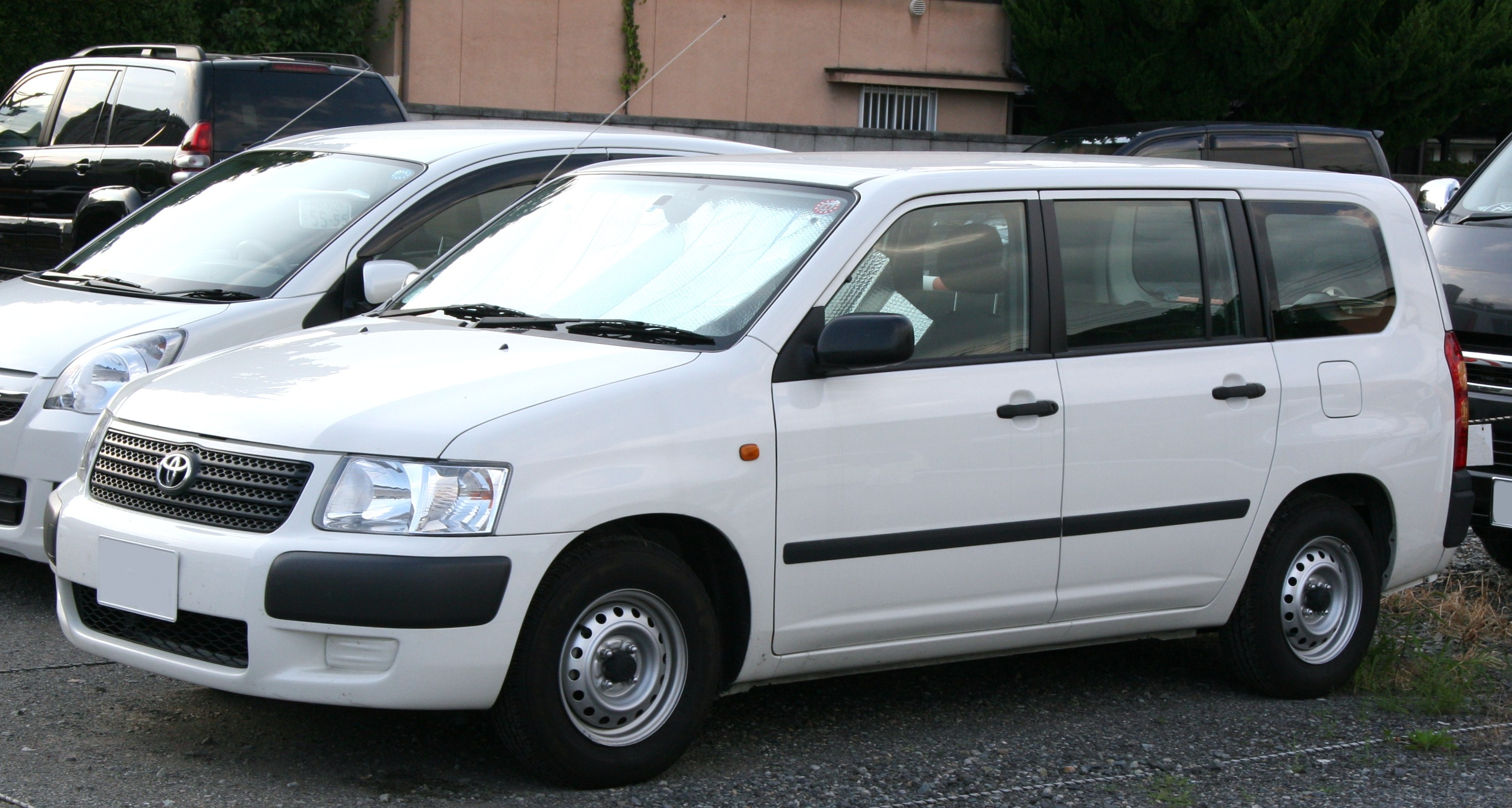
- Toyota Succeed Van UL (NCP51V)

Overview
- Manufacturer: Daihatsu
- Also called: Toyota Probox (2002–2020); Mazda Familia Van (2018–2020)
- Production: 2002–2020; *2002–2014 (XP50); *2014–2020 (XP160)
- Assembly: Japan: Ōyamazaki, Kyoto (Daihatsu Kyoto plant)

Body and chassis
- Class: Compact MPV (station wagon); Light commercial vehicle (van)
- Body style: 5-door station wagon/van
- Layout: Front-engine, front-wheel-drive; Front-engine, four-wheel-drive
- Platform: Toyota NBC platform (2002–2014); Toyota B platform (2014–2020)
- Related: Toyota Vitz; Toyota Yaris; Toyota Vios

Powertrain
- Engine: Petrol: 1.5L 1NZ-FE I4 (NCP51V/58G/59G/160V/165V); 1.5L 1NZ-FXE I4 hybrid (NHP160V); Diesel: 1.4L 1ND-TV D4D I4 turbo-diesel (NLP51V)
- Transmission: 4-speed automatic; 5-speed manual; CVT (2018)

Dimensions
- Wheelbase: 2,550 mm (100.4 in) (X50/160)
- Length: 4,300 mm (169.3 in) (XP50); 4,245 mm (167.1 in) (XP160)
- Width: 1,690–1,695 mm (66.5–66.7 in) (XP50/160)
- Height: 1,510–1,515 mm (59.4–59.6 in) (XP50); 1,525–1,530 mm (60.0–60.2 in) (XP160)
- Curb weight: 1,050–1,140 kg (2,314.9–2,513.3 lb) (XP50); 1,100–1,170 kg (2,425.1–2,579.4 lb) (XP160)

Chronology
- Predecessor: Toyota Caldina Van (T190)
- Successor: Toyota Probox (Succeed Van); Toyota Corolla Fielder (Succeed Wagon)

The Toyota Succeed is a now-discontinued station wagon/van sold by Toyota in Japan as passenger car and commercial van. It was a sister car to the Probox, sold through Toyota's Toyota Store and Toyopet Store dealership networks. After Toyota merged their separate dealership chains, the Succeed was replaced by the Probox.

== First generation (XP50; 2002) ==
The first Succeed was introduced in July 2002 as the successor to the Toyota Caldina Van. A more basic and shorter version is known as the Toyota Probox.

For 2007 Japanese models, G-Book, a subscription telematics service, was offered as an option.

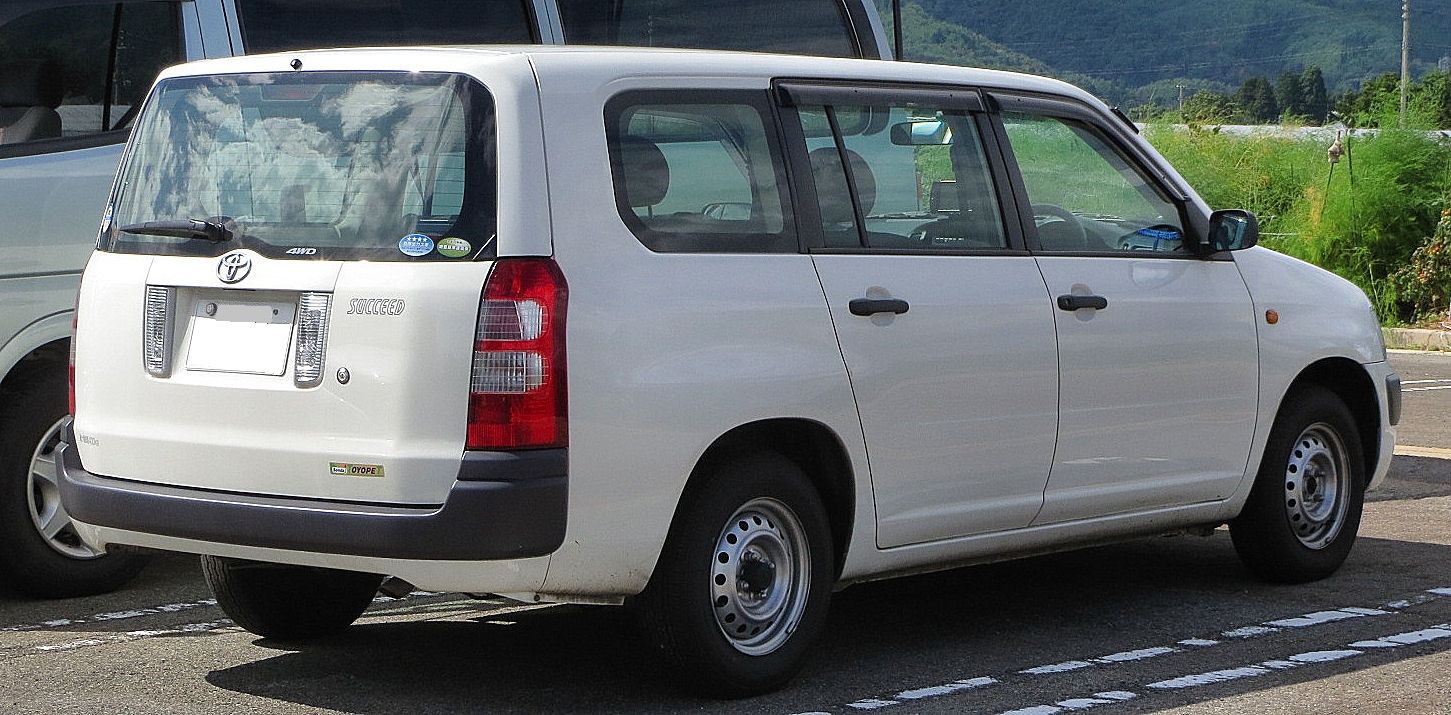
Toyota Succeed Van U 4WD (NCP55V, rear)

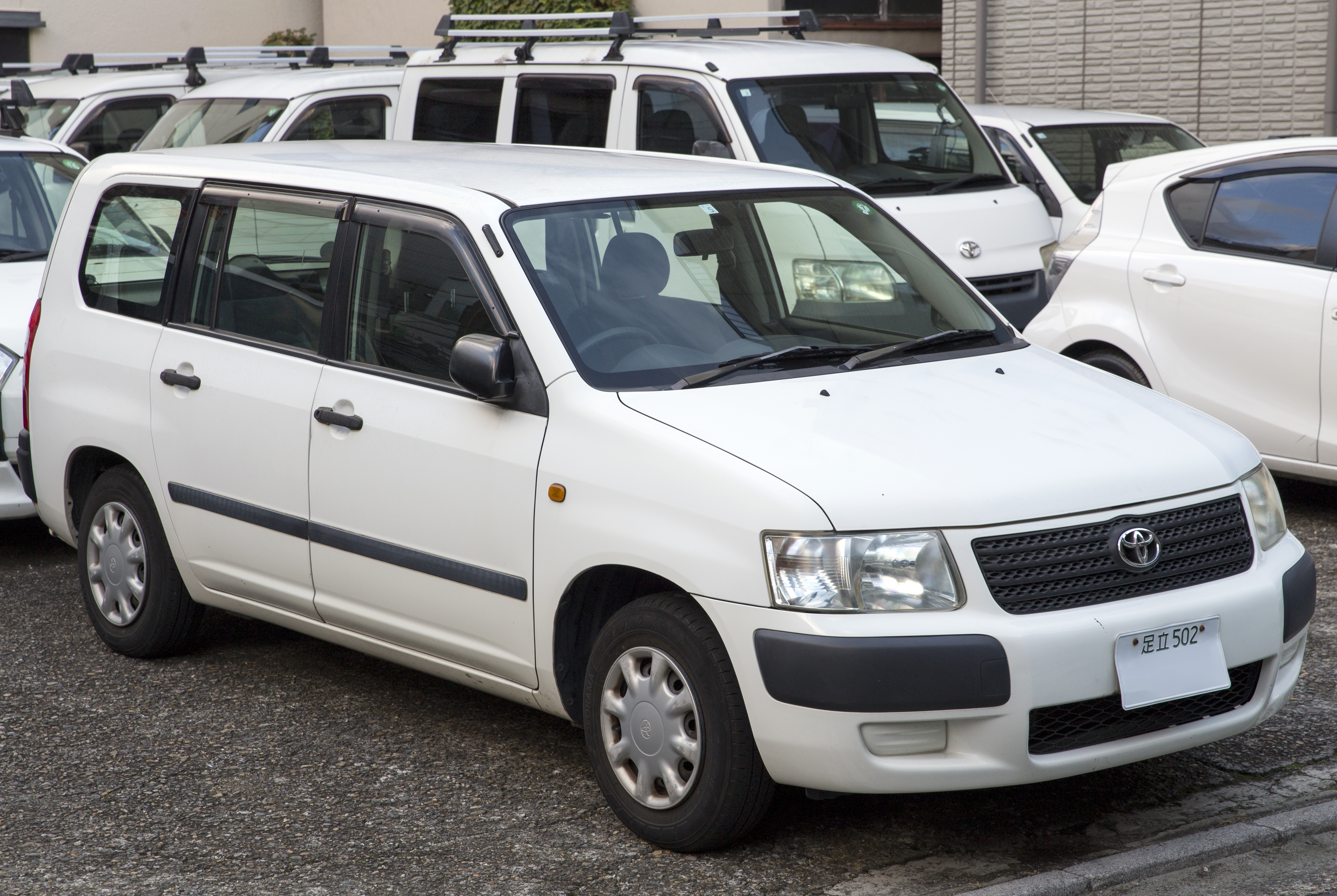
Toyota Succeed Wagon TX (NCP58G, front)

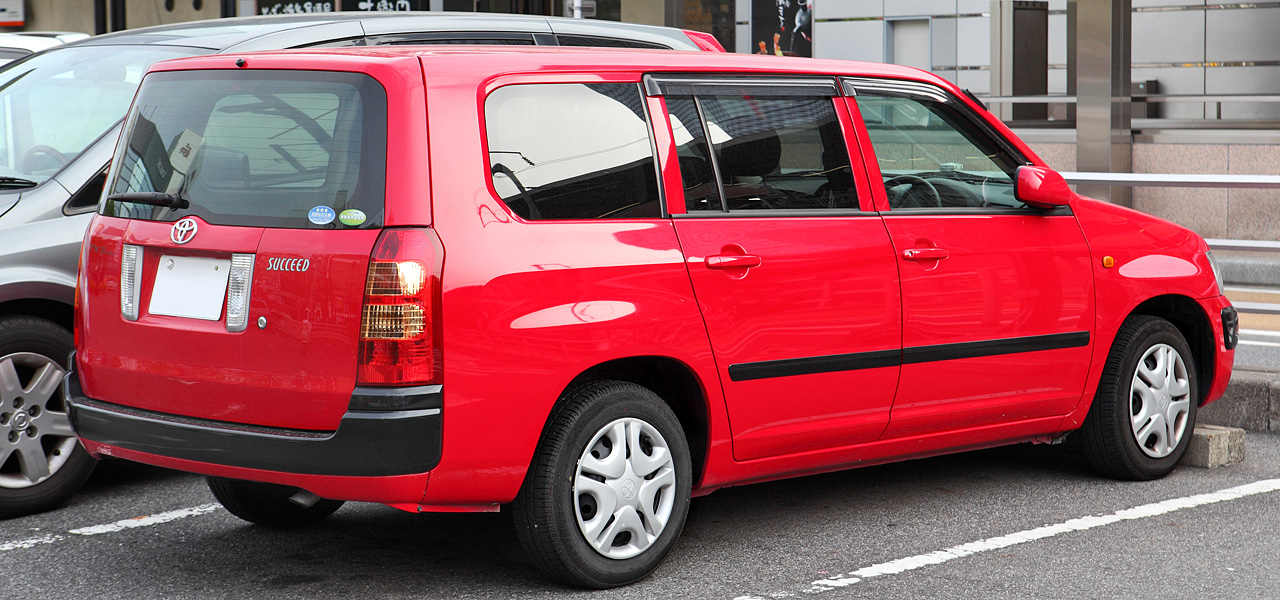
Toyota Succeed Wagon TX G Package (NCP58G, rear)

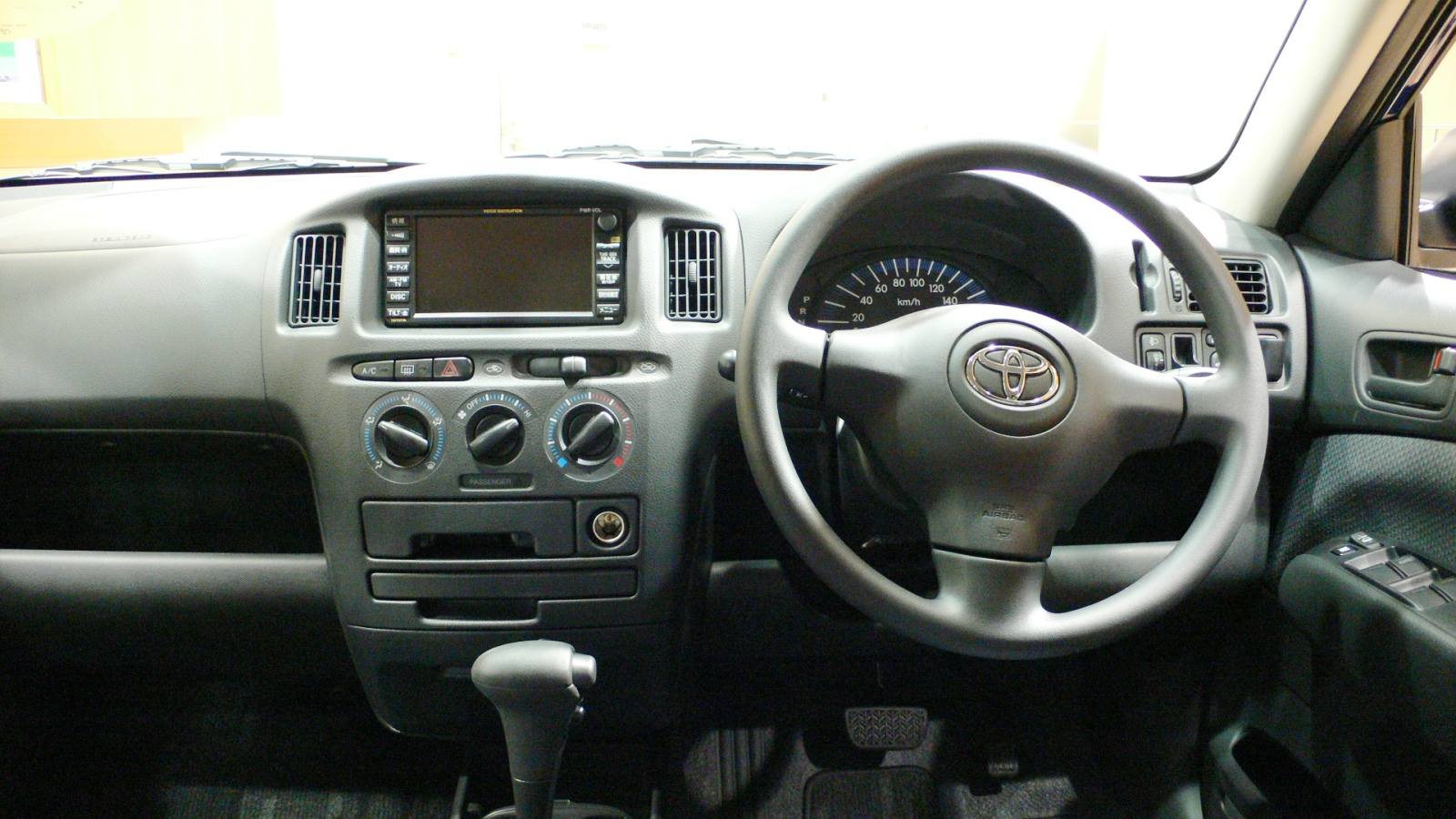
Toyota Succeed Wagon TX G Package (NCP58G, interior)

== Second generation (XP160; 2014) ==
Since the 2014 facelift, the Succeed and Probox are identical. However, the Probox is also available with a 1.3-litre engine. The passenger variants of the two were discontinued and the role was taken over by Toyota Corolla Fielder Wagon. The Succeed was available through Toyota and Toyopet dealerships, while the Probox was sold through Corolla dealerships. Starting in 2018, Toyota Japan started merging its four dealership formulas, marking the end of the twinned model lines. Accordingly, the Succeed was discontinued in May 2020.

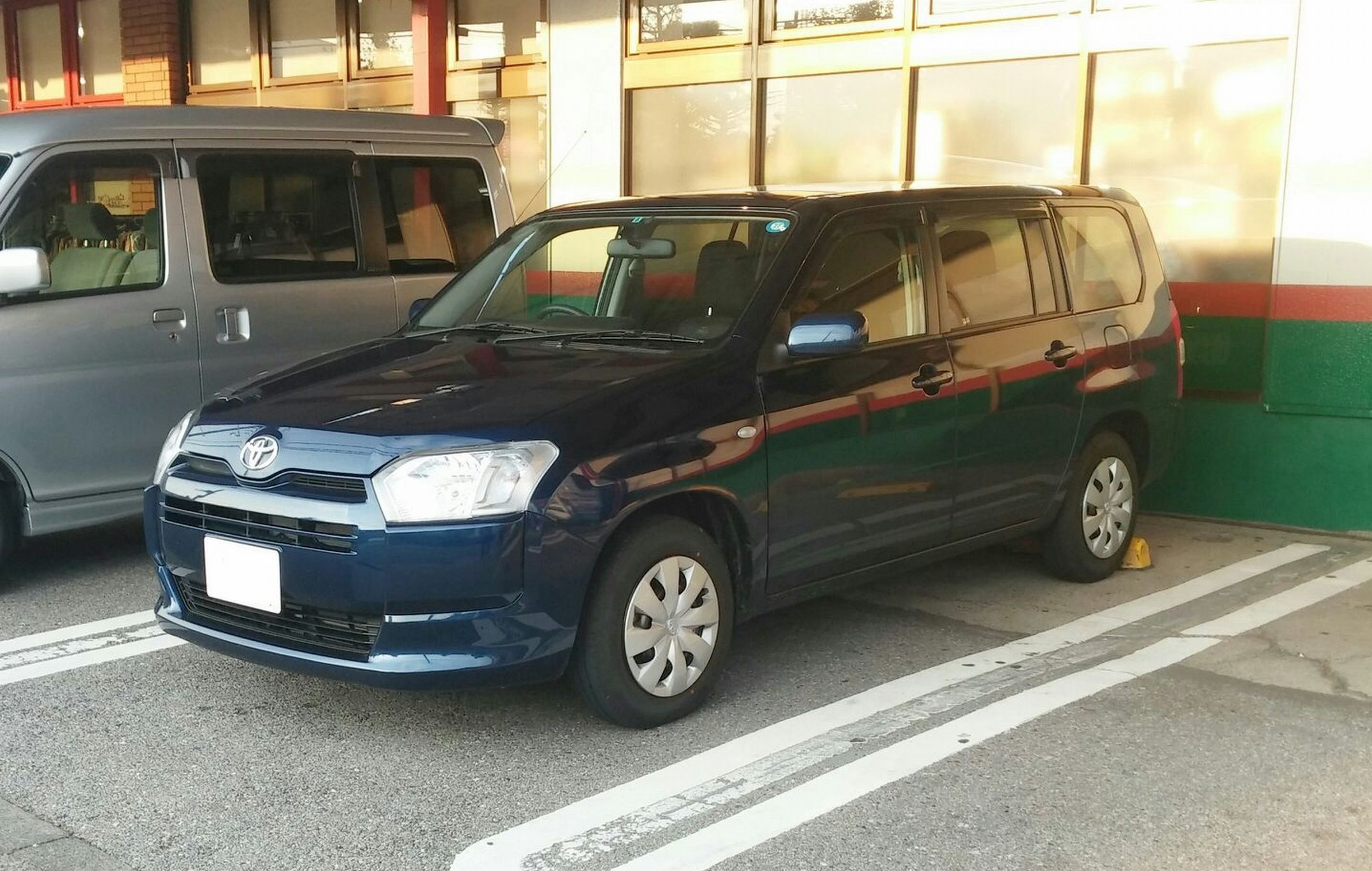
Toyota Succeed TX (NCP160V)
