= Toyota Probox =

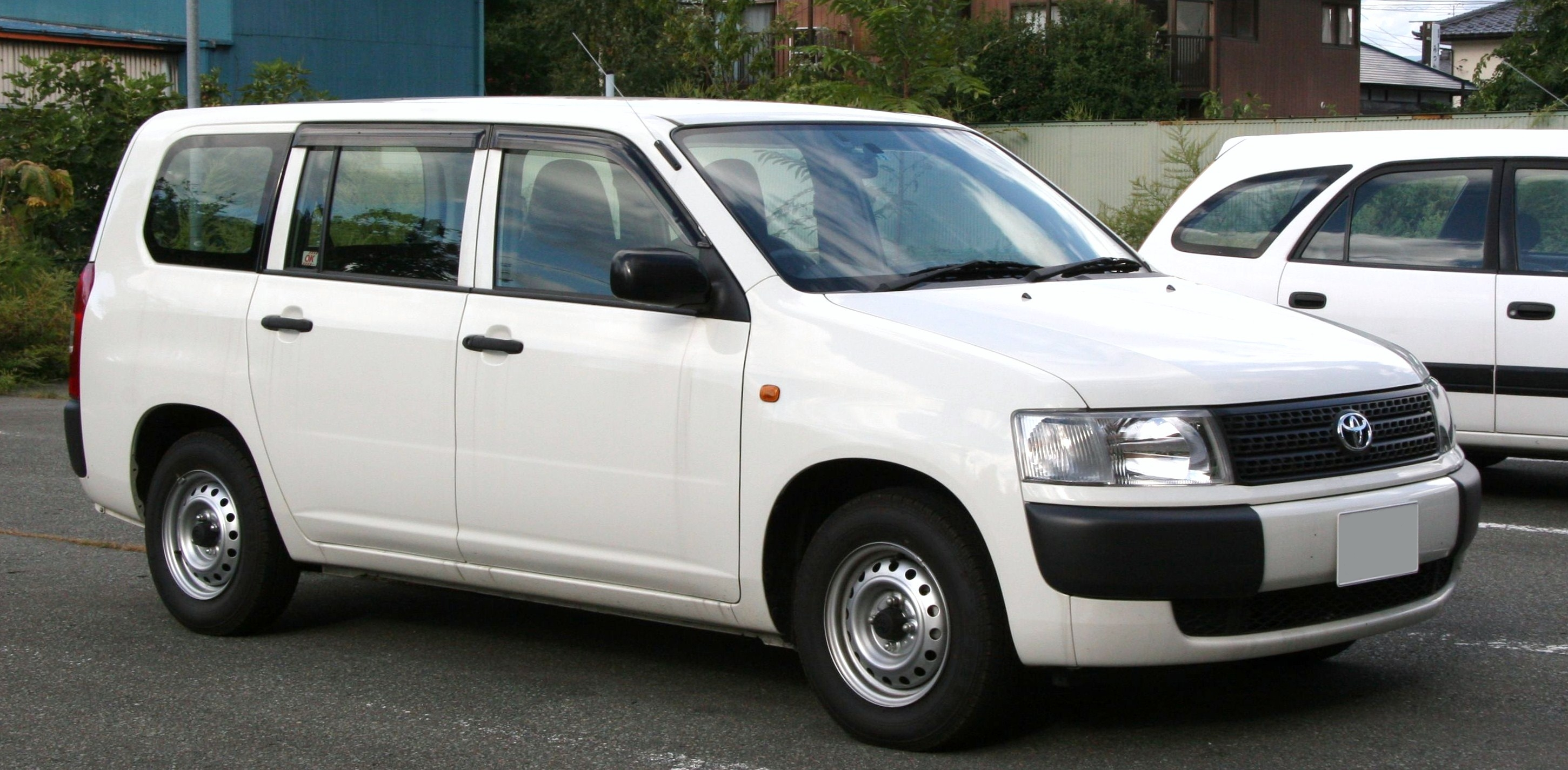
- Toyota Probox Van (first generation)

Overview
- Manufacturer: Daihatsu
- Also called: Toyota Succeed (2002–2020); Mazda Familia Van (2018–present)
- Production: 2002–present
- Assembly: Japan: Ōyamazaki, Kyoto (Daihatsu Kyoto plant)

Body and chassis
- Class: Light commercial vehicle
- Body style: 5-door station wagon/van
- Layout: Front-engine, front-wheel-drive; Front-engine, four-wheel-drive

Chronology
- Predecessor: Toyota Corolla/Sprinter Van (E100)
- Successor: Toyota Corolla Fielder (Probox Wagon)

The Toyota Probox (Japanese: トヨタ・プロボックス, Hepburn: Toyota Purobokkusu) is a 5-door, 2- or 4-seater passenger car (Probox Wagon) and light commercial van (Probox Van) produced by the Japanese automaker Toyota since July 2002. It replaced the Corolla/Sprinter van and served as a slightly shorter version of the now-discontinued Toyota Succeed.

The Probox has been a commercial success with stable sales for 20 years. It is notable that its design has remained largely unchanged since 2002 due to buyer preference. A significant redesign in 2014 was presented as a facelift by Toyota, to avoid putting off buyers who disdain needless changes.

== First generation (XP50; 2002) ==
Toyota Probox (XP50)
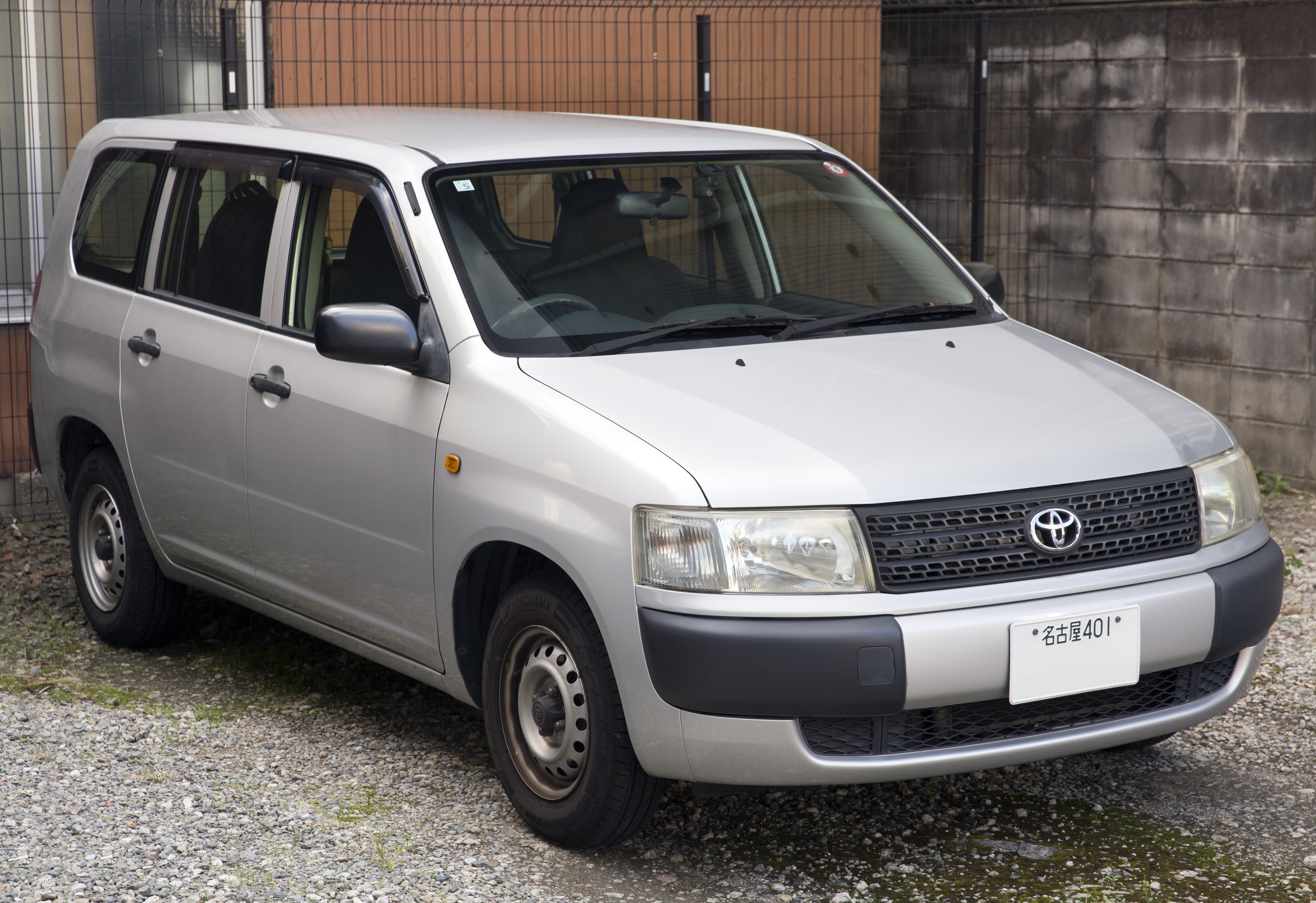
- Toyota Probox VVT-i DX

Overview
- Also called: Toyota Succeed
- Production: 2002–2014

Body and chassis
- Platform: Toyota NBC platform

Powertrain
- Engine: Petrol: 1.3 L 2NZ-FE I4 (NCP50V); 1.5 L 1NZ-FE I4 (NCP51V/55V/58G/59G); CNG: 1.5 L 1NZ-FNE I4 (NCP52V); Diesel: 1.4 L 1ND-TV D4D I4 turbodiesel (NLP51V)
- Transmission: 4-speed automatic; 5-speed manual

Dimensions
- Wheelbase: 2,550 mm (100.4 in)
- Length: 4,195 mm (165.2 in)
- Width: 1,690–1,695 mm (66.5–66.7 in)
- Height: 1,510–1,530 mm (59.4–60.2 in)
- Curb weight: 1,030–1,120 kg (2,271–2,469 lb)

The Toyota Probox was created as a new type of commercial van in July 2002. The original version's model code is XP50. Toyota's Corolla/Sprinter Van, derived from the passenger cars, had been losing significant marketshare to Nissan's more fully cargo-oriented AD Van. Therefore, Toyota set out to surpass the AD Van in every parameter. The closely related Succeed also had to succeed the larger Caldina Van, as Toyota rationalized their lineup. Ease of use and cost reduction through simplicity were the other design objectives. To save cost and weight, the Probox uses the smaller Vitz/Yaris' NBC platform, with a bespoke rear half developed to maximize space and stability regardless of load. The rear shock absorbers are placed beneath the floor, tilted backwards. Daihatsu was partially responsible for development and the Probox/Succeed are built in that company's Kyoto plant.

Most Proboxes are Vans, but the line was also available as a more passenger and comfort-oriented Wagon, which was only available with the larger petrol engine and was discontinued in October 2013. Unlike the Van, the Wagon has a larger, more comfortable rear seat with headrests. While the Probox Van is typically painted white or silver, or other subdued colors such as navy or black, the Wagon was also available in Champagne and the F Extra Package Limited was offered in other colors like aqua, green, and maroon.

It was available with 1.3 or 1.5-litre four-cylinder petrol engines from the NZ family as well as a 1.4-litre 1ND-TV turbodiesel. From April 2003, the 1.5-litre NZ engine was also available in a version powered by CNG; thus equipped it produces 92 PS (68 kW) at 6,000 rpm and 125 N⋅m (92 lb⋅ft) at 4,000 rpm. As diesels continued to fall out of favor in the Japanese market, this option (the last, sub-2 litre diesel model then built in Japan) was discontinued in September 2007.

Until 2008, the Probox and its somewhat longer "brother model" Succeed typically sold from 70,000 to 90,000 units a year. Since 2008, the model has maintained the sales of about 50,000 units per year.

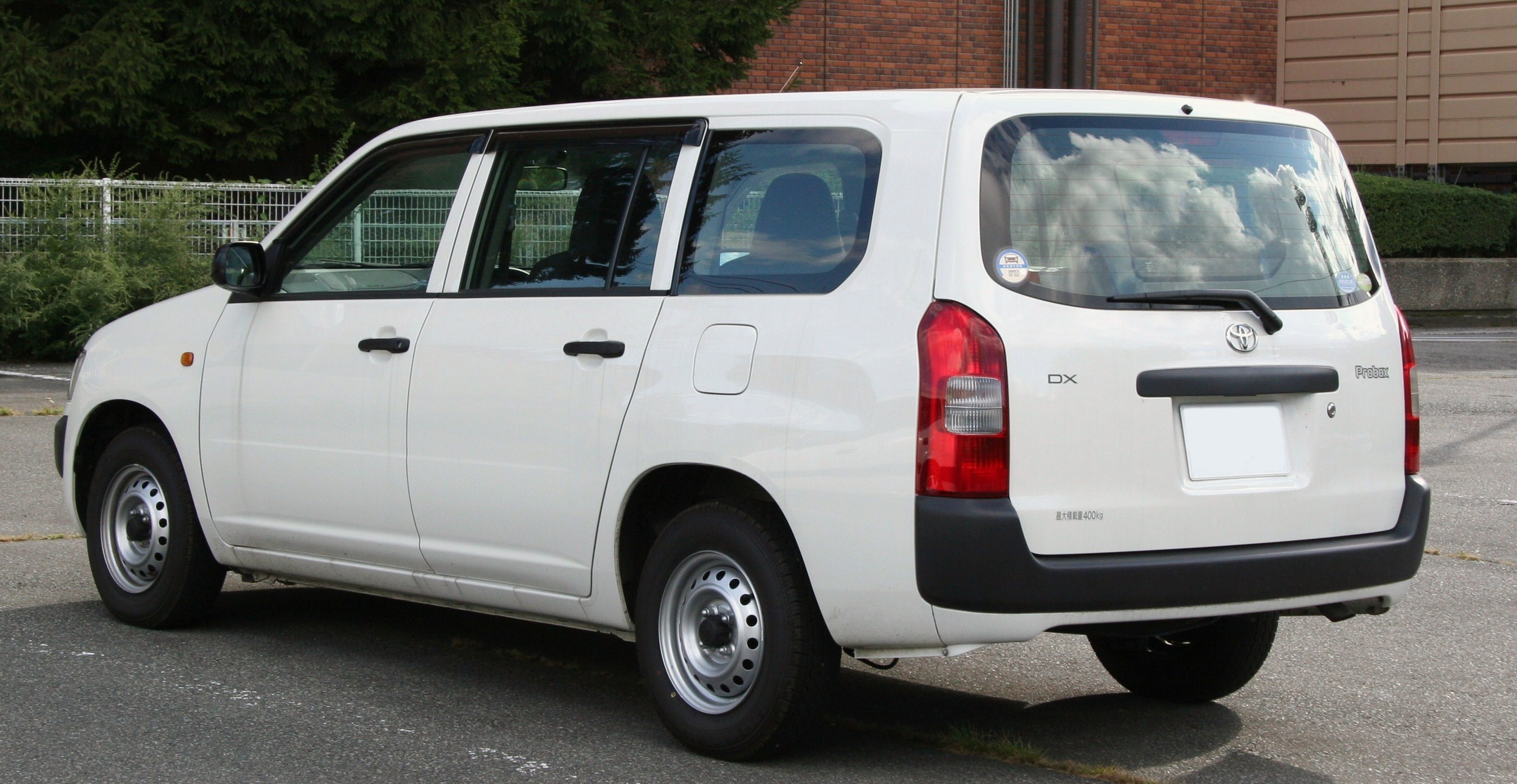
Toyota Probox Van DX; rear view (NCP51V)

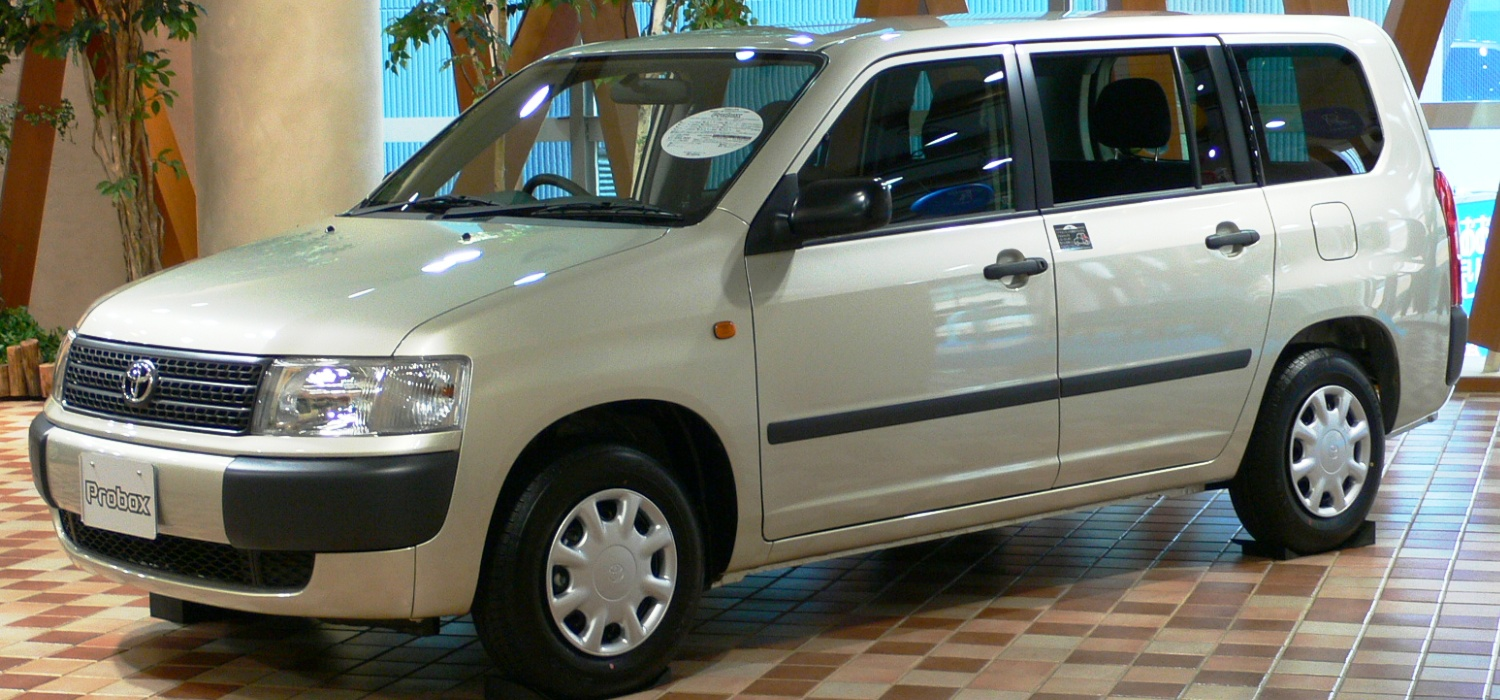
Toyota Probox Wagon (NCP58G)

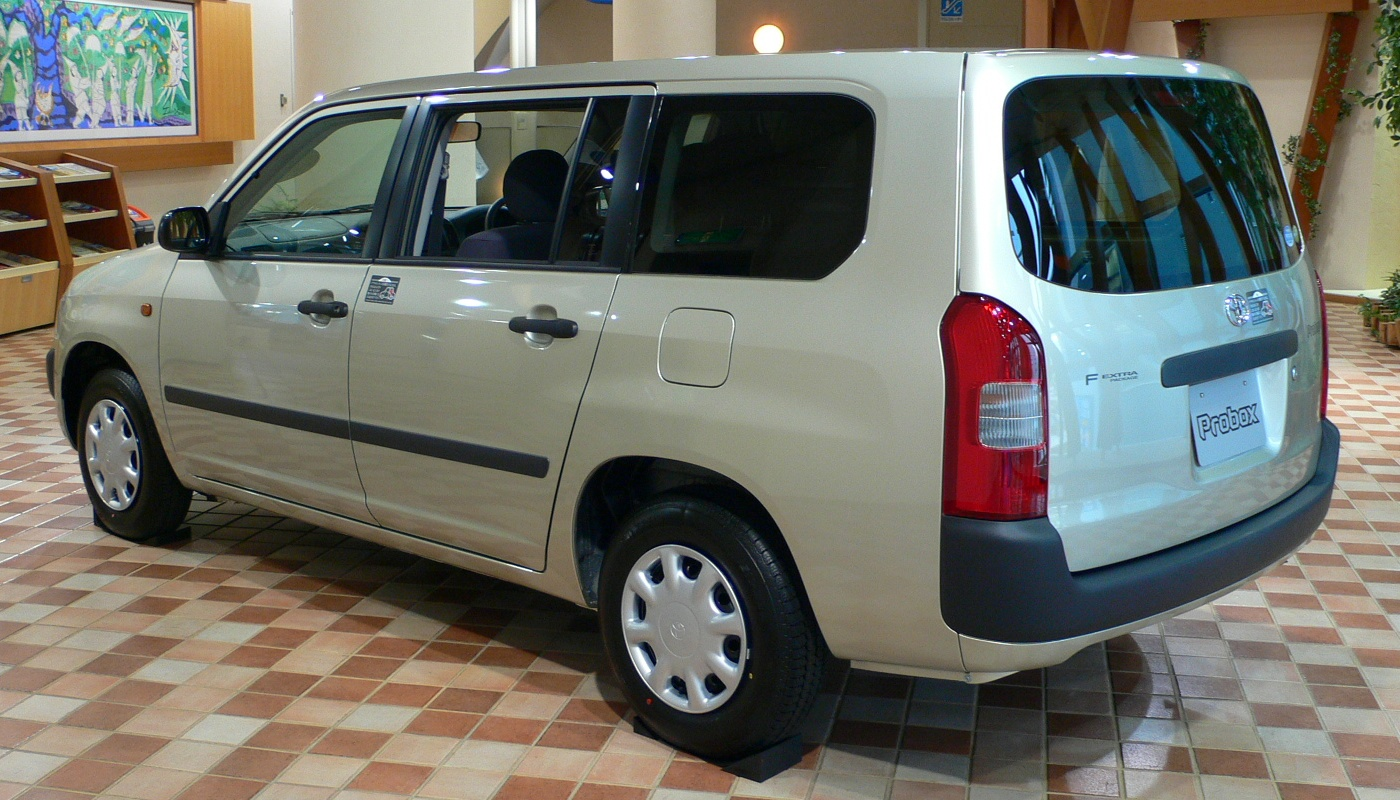
Toyota Probox Wagon; rear view (NCP58G)

== Second generation (XP160; 2014) ==
Toyota Probox (XP160)
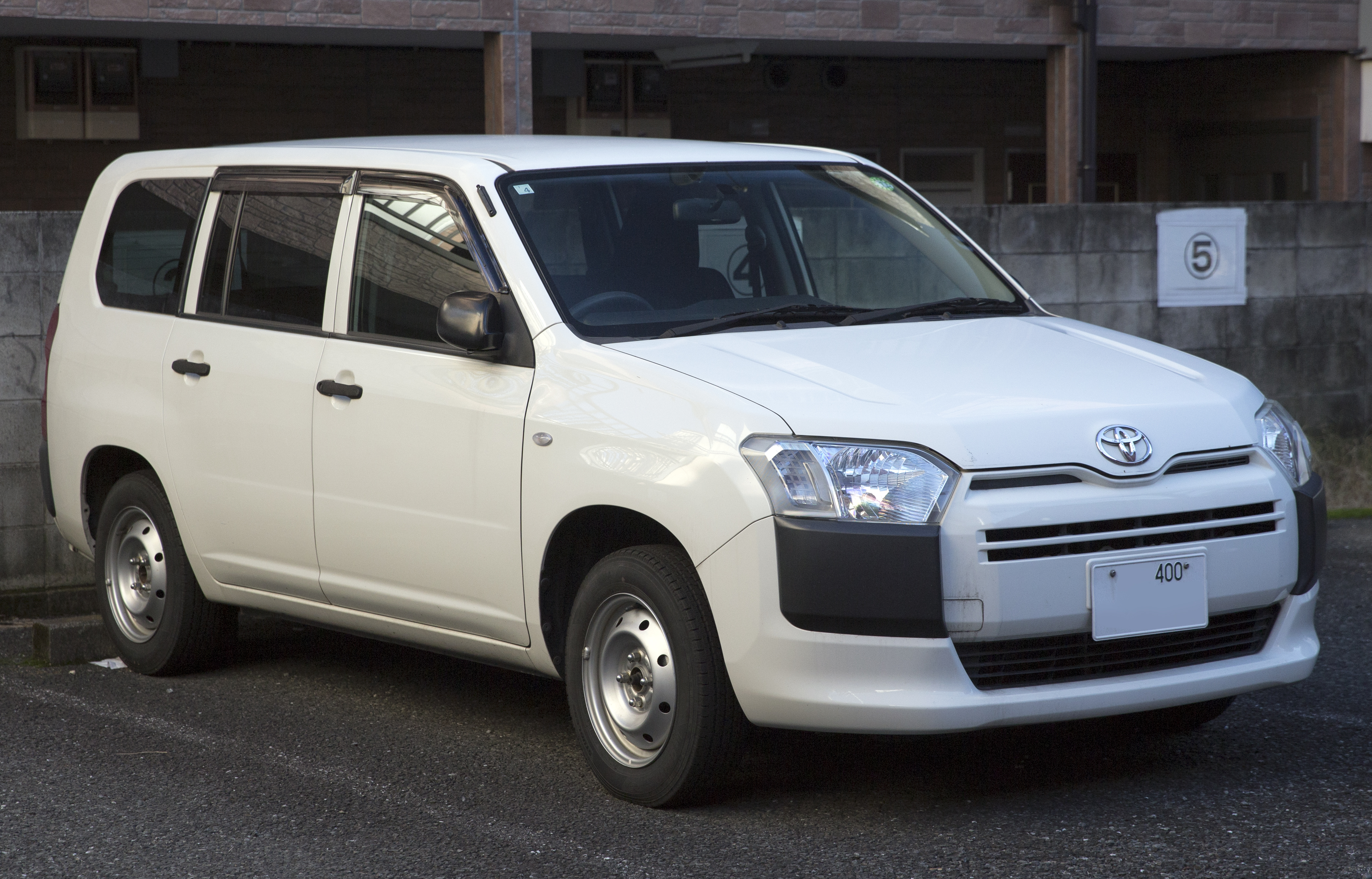
- Toyota Probox (2014-2020 model)

Overview
- Also called: Toyota Succeed (2014–2020); Mazda Familia Van (2018–present)
- Production: 2014–present

Body and chassis
- Platform: Toyota B platform

Powertrain
- Engine: Petrol: 1.3L 1NR-FE I4 (NSP160V); 1.5L 1NZ-FE I4 (NCP160V/165V); 1.5L 1NZ-FXE I4 hybrid (NHP160V)
- Transmission: CVT

Dimensions
- Wheelbase: 2,550 mm (100.4 in)
- Length: 4,245 mm (167.1 in)
- Width: 1,690 mm (66.5 in)
- Height: 1,525–1,530 mm (60.0–60.2 in)
- Curb weight: 1,090–1,170 kg (2,403–2,579 lb)

The Probox received a complete redesign, which was announced on August 6, 2014, with sales beginning on September 1 of the same year. The redesign was announced alongside the redesign of the Succeed. The earlier 1.3-litre engine was replaced by the more efficient 1NR-FE engine. While announced as a facelift, the reengineered model was given a new model code as the Japanese automobile type approval system considers it a second generation. The new engine and CVT transmission did require substantial changes beneath the skin, as the front half was changed from the existing NBC platform to the new B platform. The B platform was too wide for the existing body and had to be narrowed by 60 mm (2.4 in). The body structure was unchanged from the A-pillar back, as conservative commercial vehicle buyers were not interested in change for change's sake. The redesign was forced by new, stricter emissions and fuel consumption regulations, which required upgrading to the new platform and technology. In the interest of lowering emissions and fuel consumption, the second generation has only ever been available with the Super CVT-i transmission.

Starting in 2018, a rebadged version of the Probox has been offered in Japan as the Mazda Familia Van.

Although the Succeed was discontinued in May 2020, the Probox continued stable sales, selling 48,000 units in 2021. The Probox also received very minor improvements in August 2020, namely redesigned wing mirrors and certification of some models meeting certain new fuel consumption and emissions standards.

Toyota Probox (second generation)

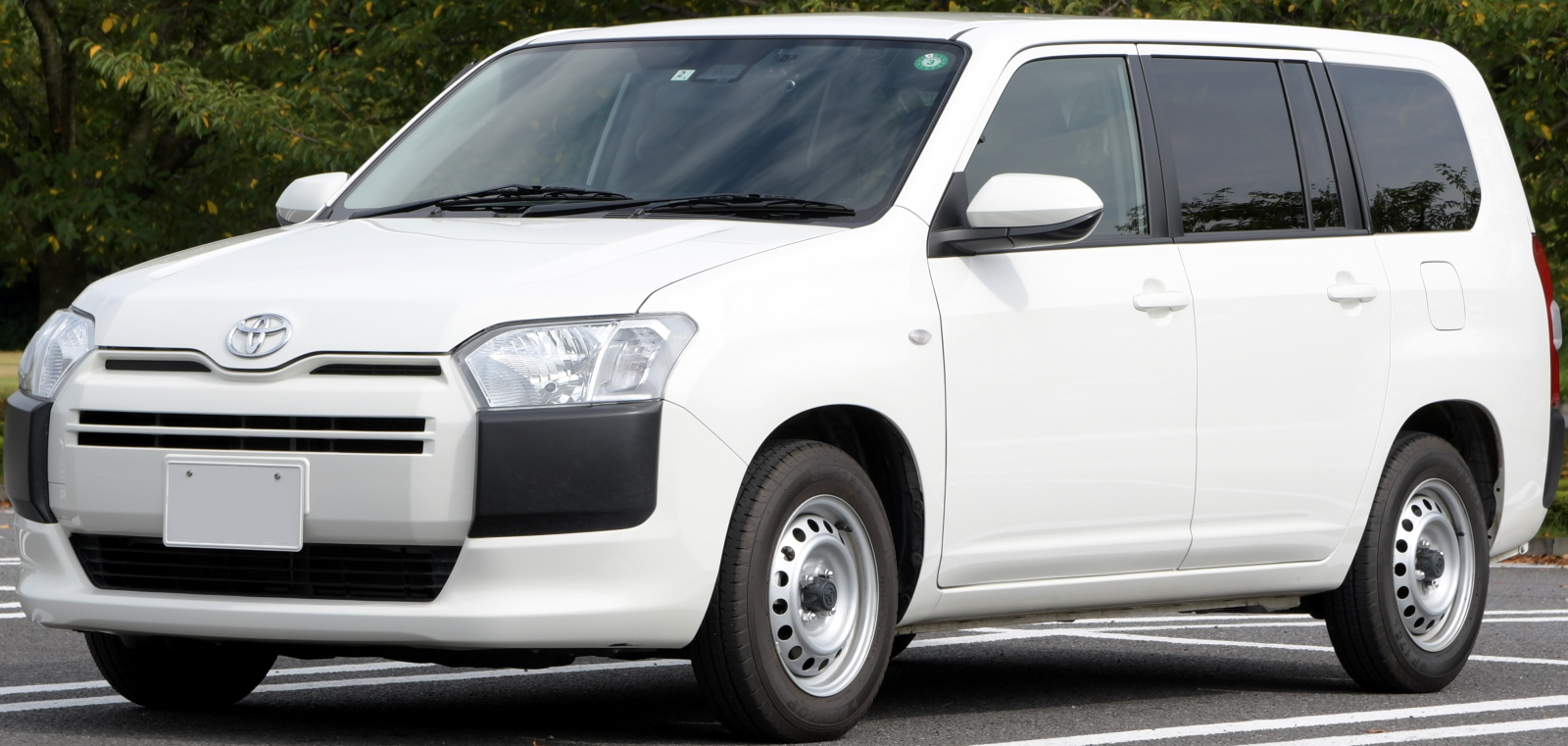
Toyota Probox Van GL (NCP160V; 2020 facelift with new wing mirrors)

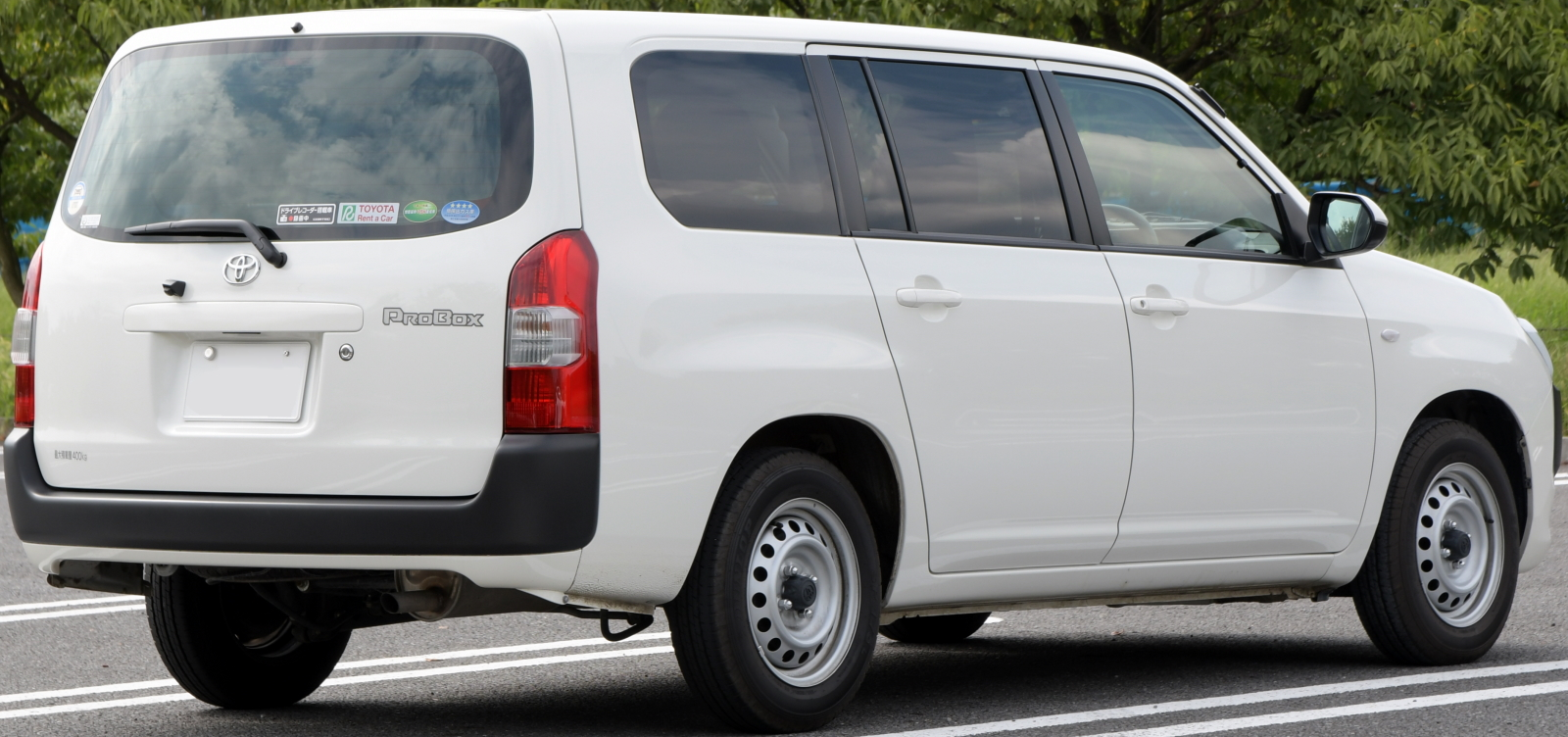
Toyota Probox Van GL (NCP160V)

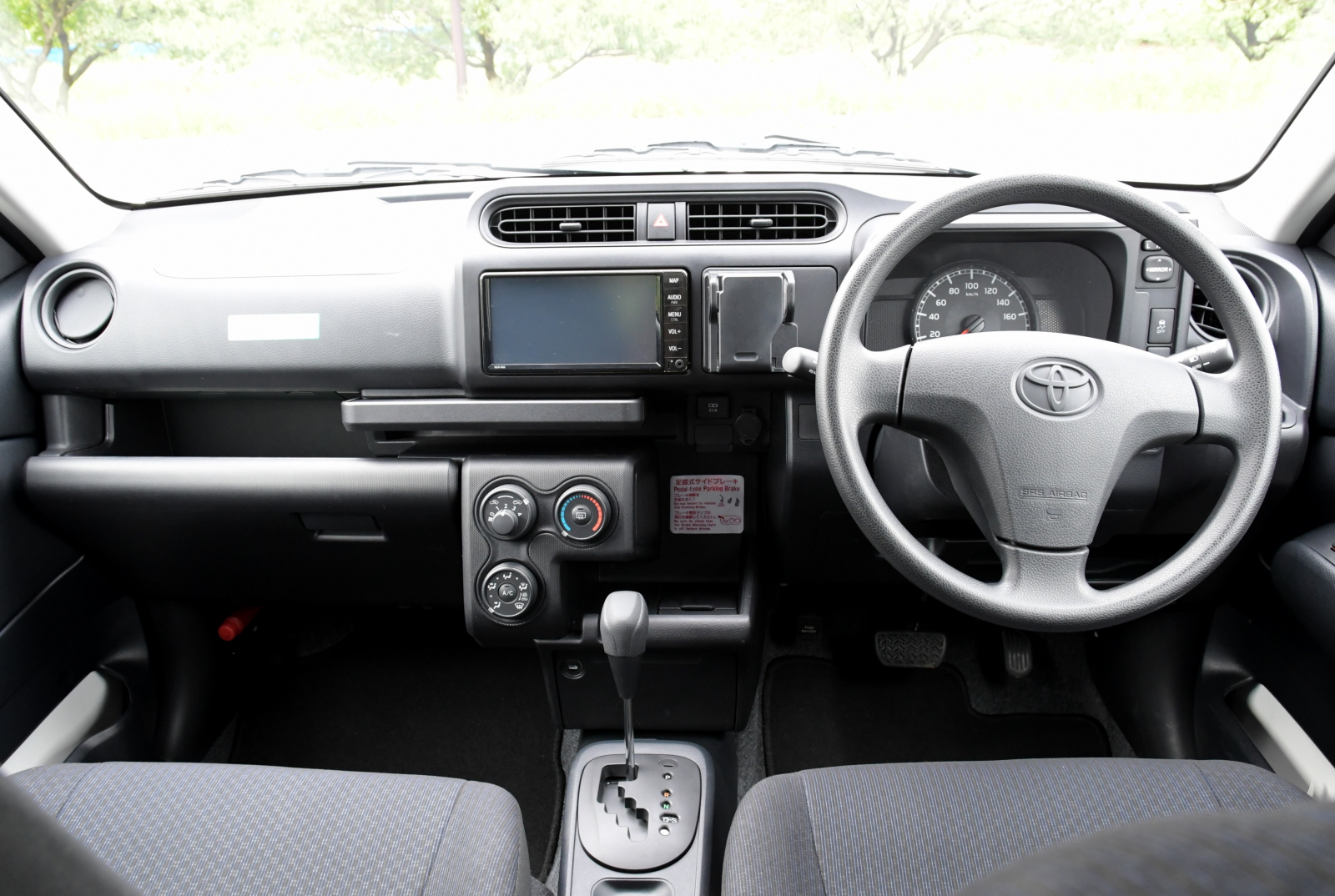
Interior (NCP160V)

Mazda Familia Van

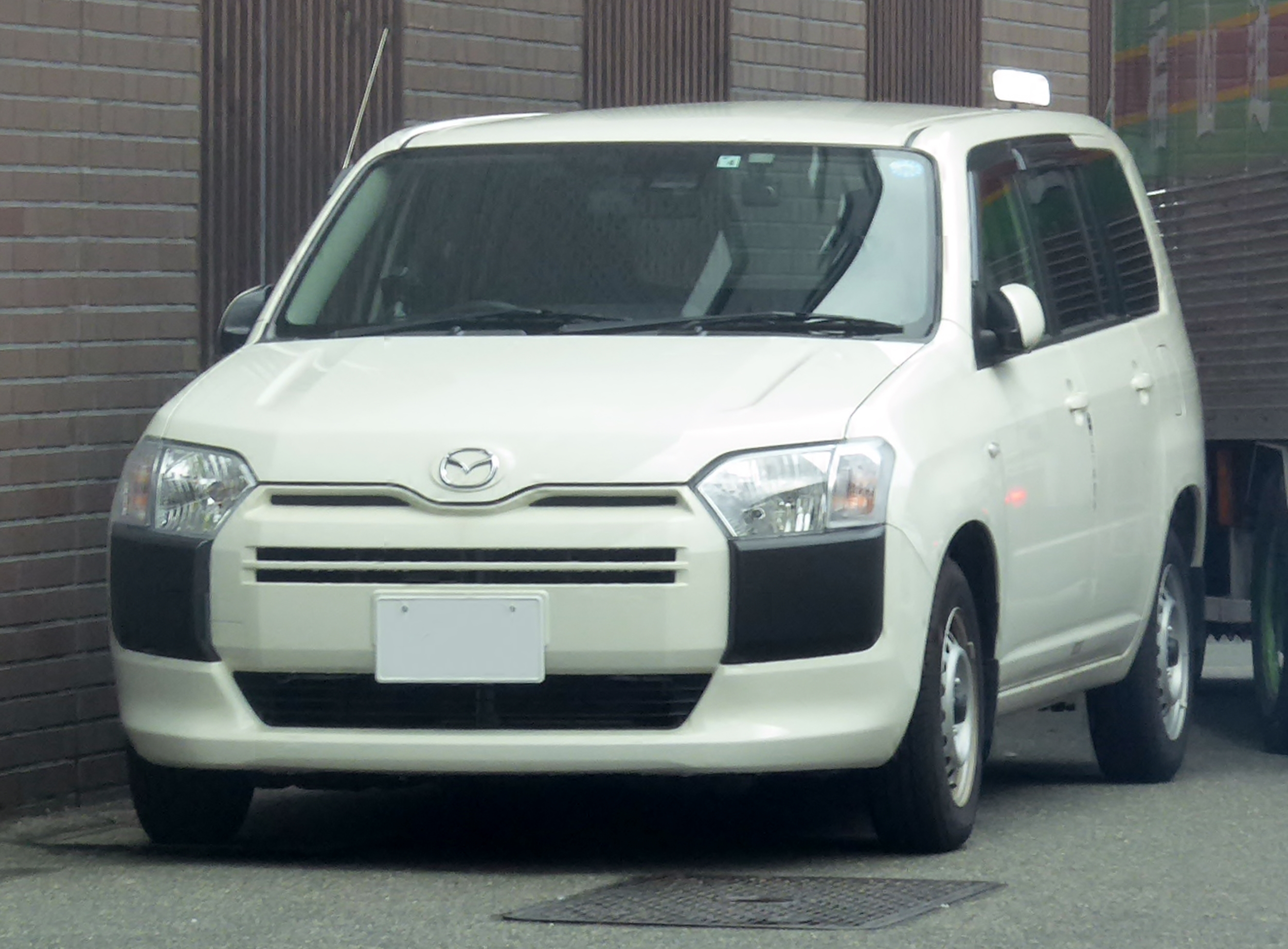
Mazda Familia Van DX (NCP160M)

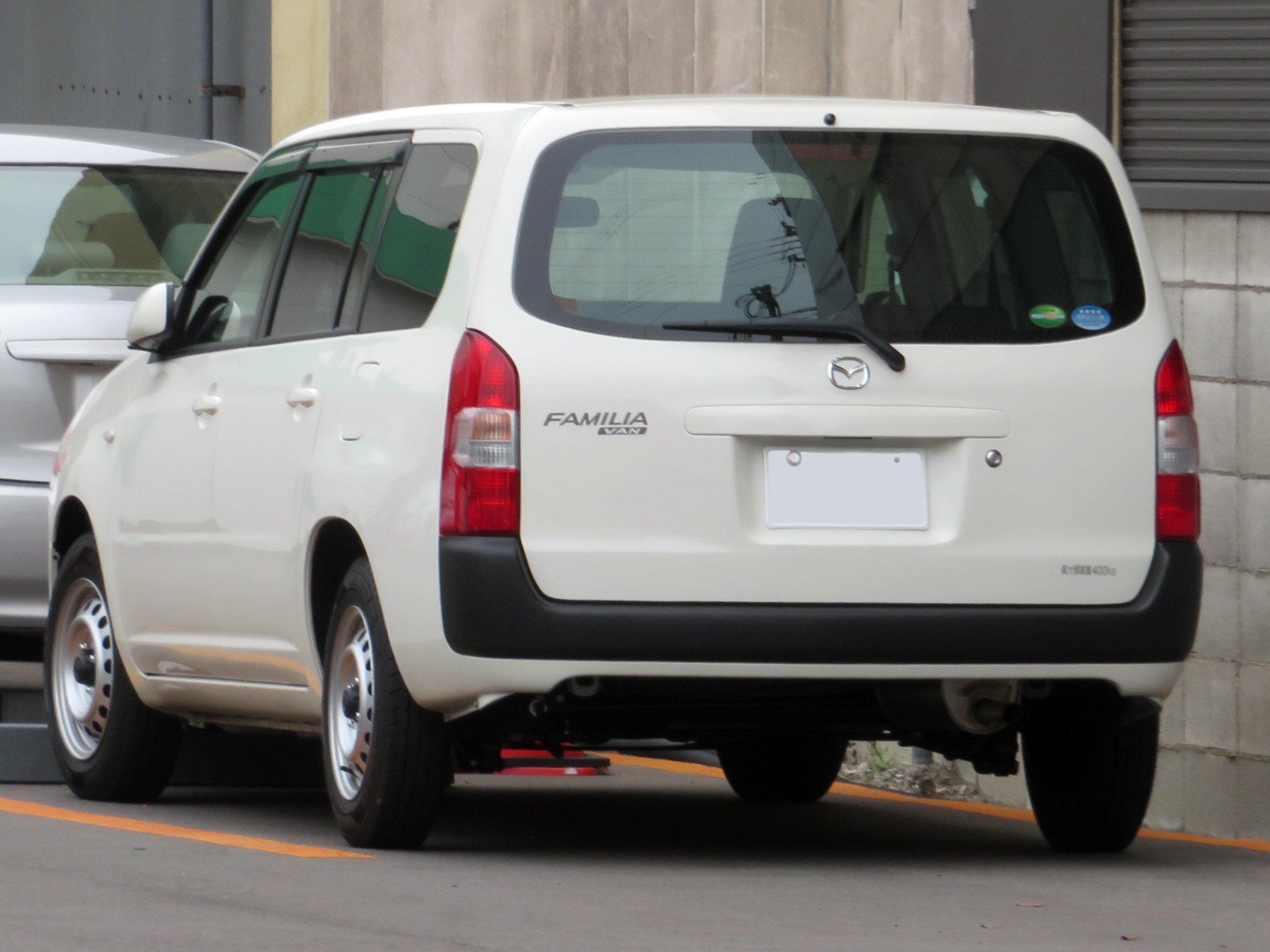
Mazda Familia Van DX (NCP160M)

== Popularity ==
The Probox is extensively used as a taxi in Peru and Bolivia. It is one of the most popular cars in East Africa owing to its perceived durability and versatility, popular with business owners transporting goods and as taxis.

In Kenya the Probox is associated with reckless drivers, and the vehicle is also preferred by corrupt police and a kidnapping gang. In 2019, the country banned the use of the Probox and Toyota Sienta for minibus use, citing frequent overloading of up to 14 passengers, instead of the five it is designed for.

Right-hand-drive Proboxes imported from Japan are common in Myanmar despite the country driving on the opposite side.

The Probox is popular among taxi drivers in Jamaica. In 2020, a single was released by RDX called 'Probox' to show their appreciation for local taxi drivers.
