= E160 =

E160 may refer to:

- An E number for carotenoids used as food coloring
- Huawei E160, a 3G modem stick
- Toyota Corolla (E160), a car
