= Mazda Familia Van =

The Mazda Familia Van (also known as the Mazda Familia Wagon) is a light commercial vehicle sold by Mazda. Despite sharing the same name as the Familia, it is not manufactured by Mazda; rather, it is a badge-engineered variant of an existing vehicle from another manufacturer. From 1994 to 2018, the Familia Wagon/Van was based on the Nissan AD wagon. In June 2018, Mazda transferred the Familia Van name to the Toyota Probox after Mazda and Toyota started an alliance.

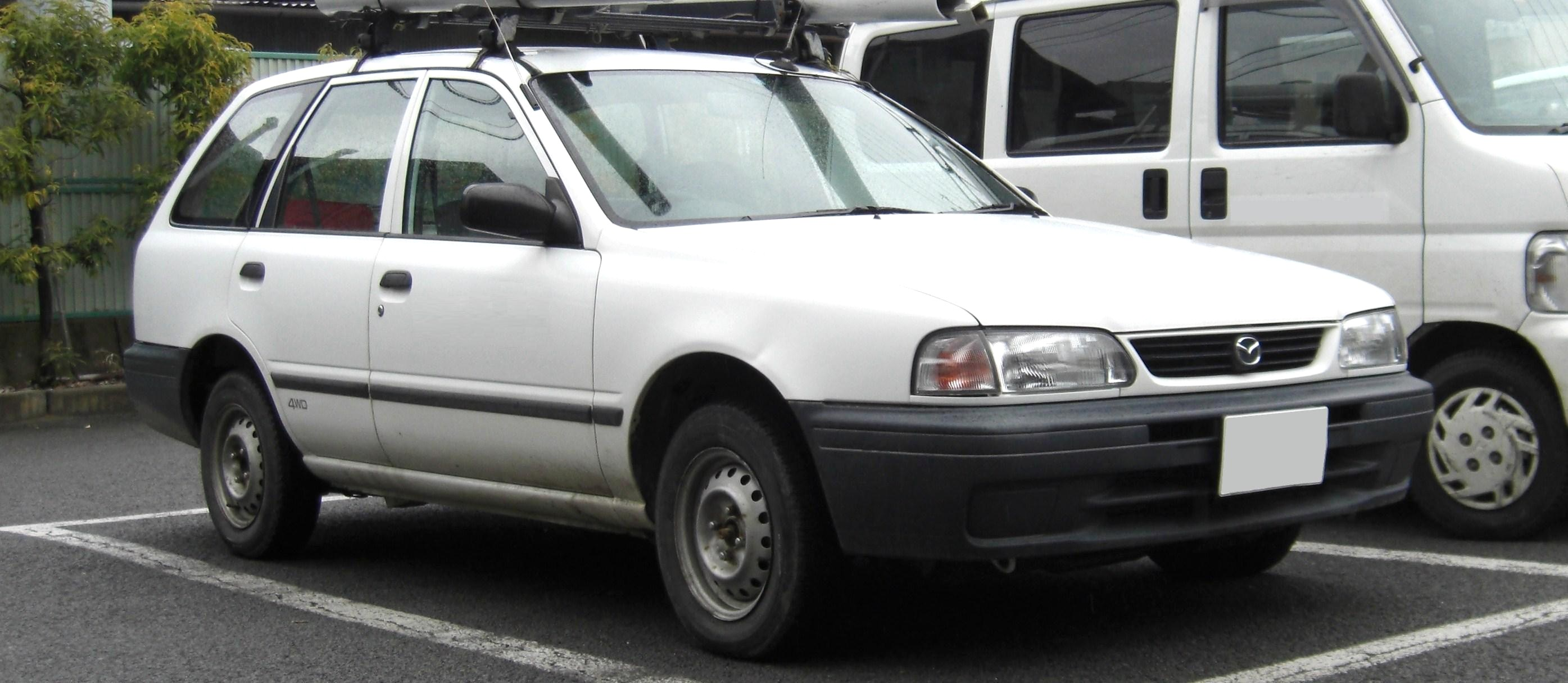
Mazda Familia Wagon Y10 (1994–1999)

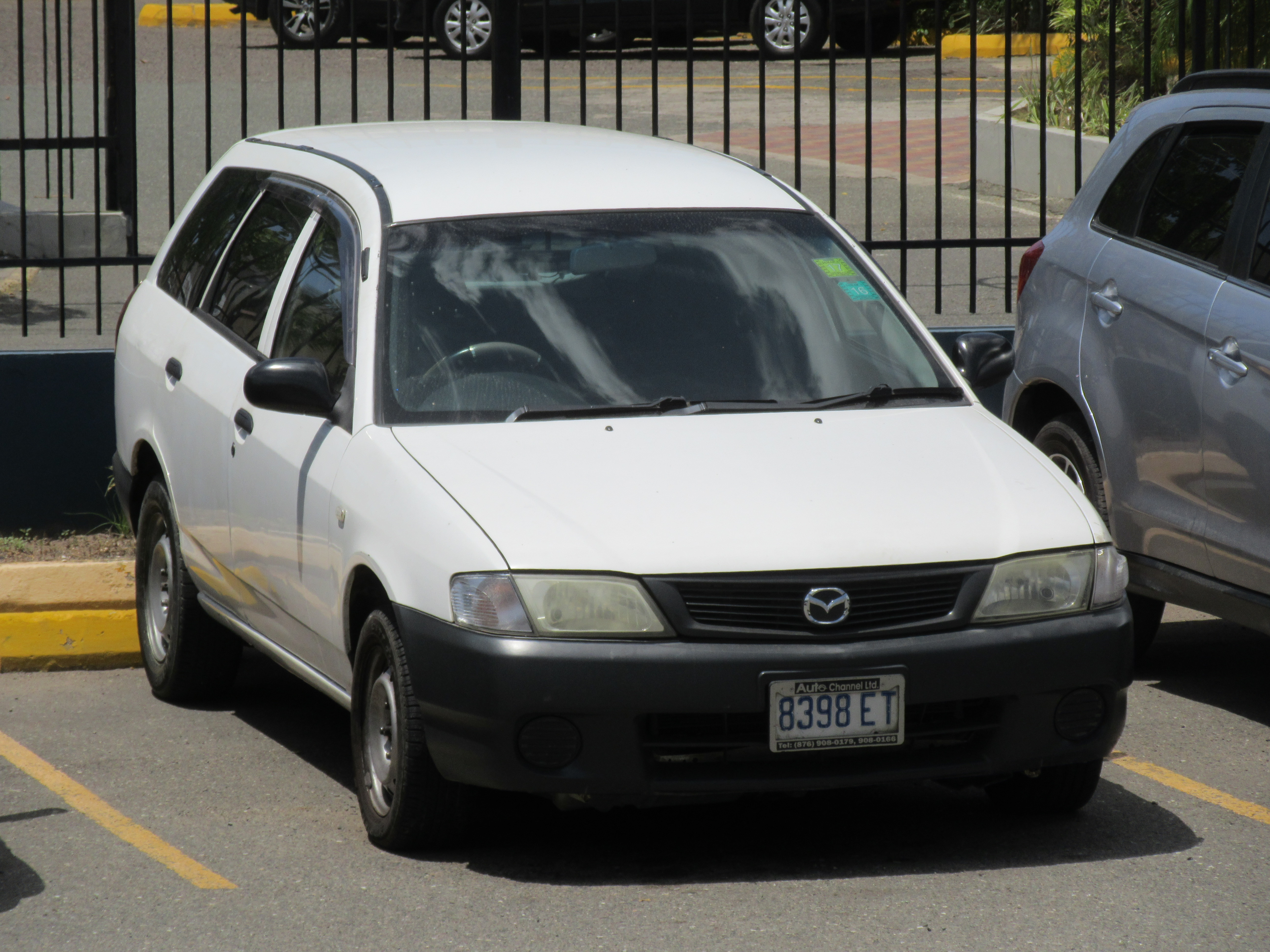
Mazda Familia Van Y11 (1999–2008)

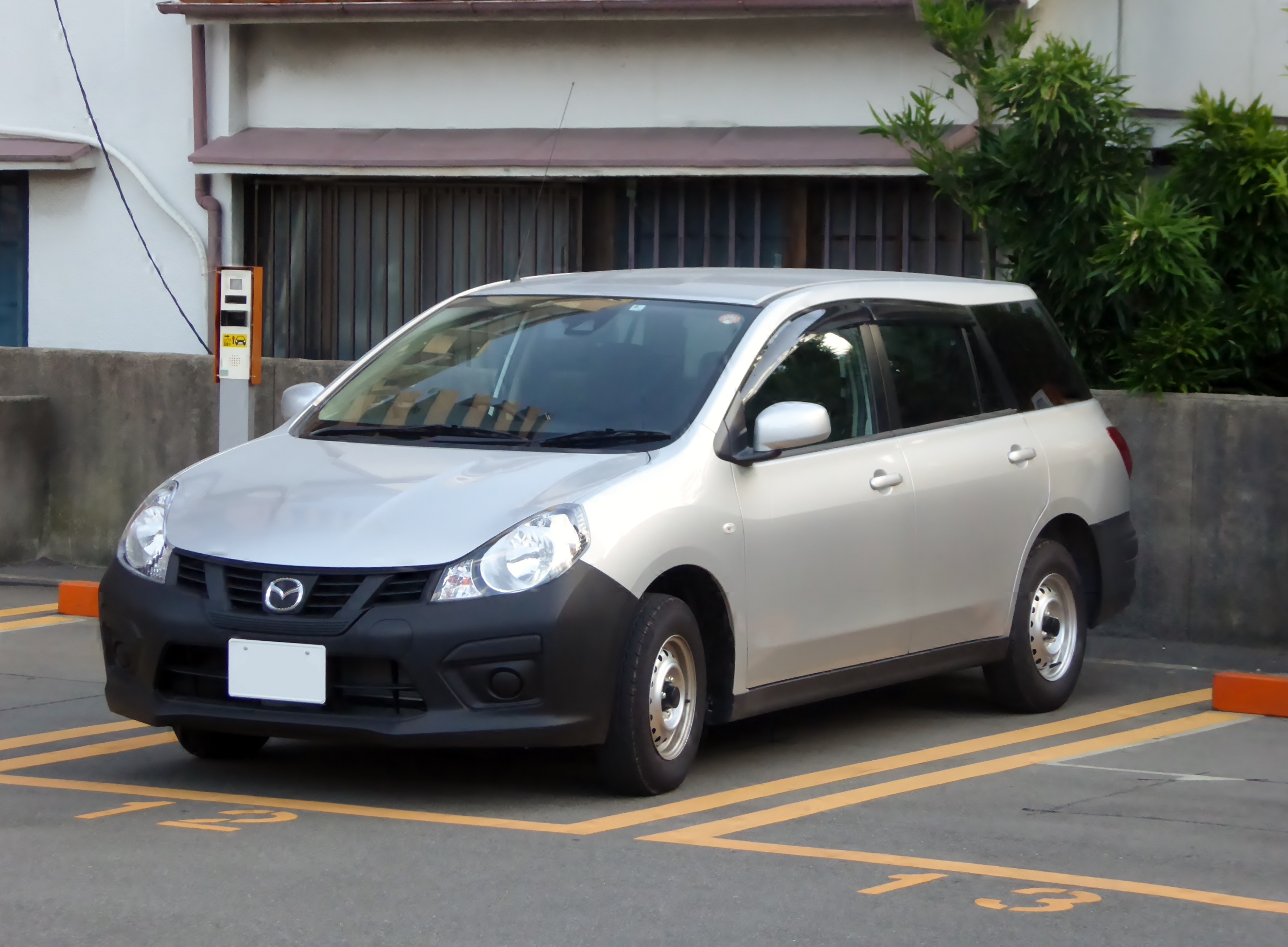
Mazda Familia Van Y12 (2007–2018)

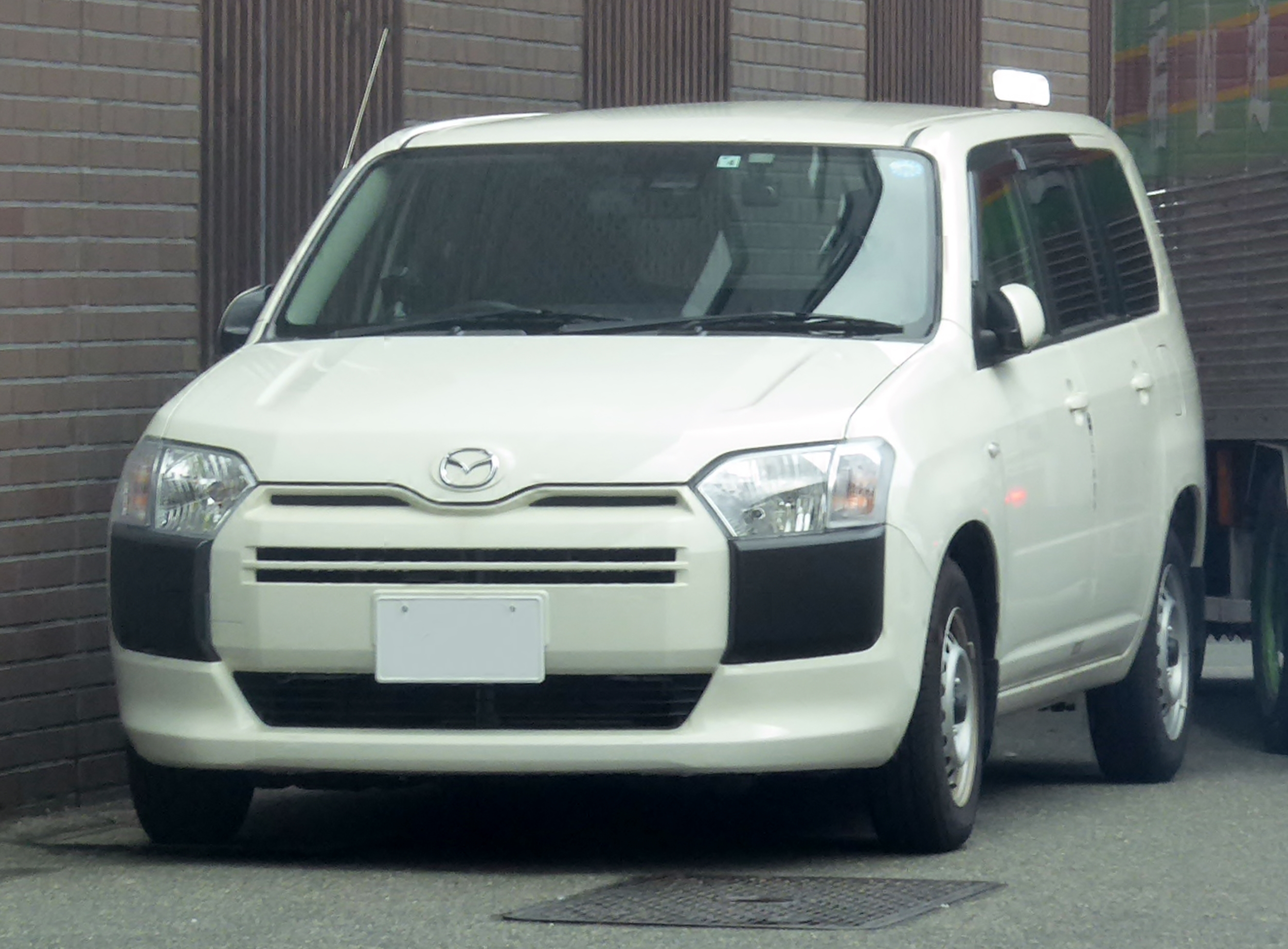
Mazda Familia Van XP160 (2018–present)
