= Toyota Corolla (E160) =

Eleventh generation of Toyota Corolla for selected Asian markets

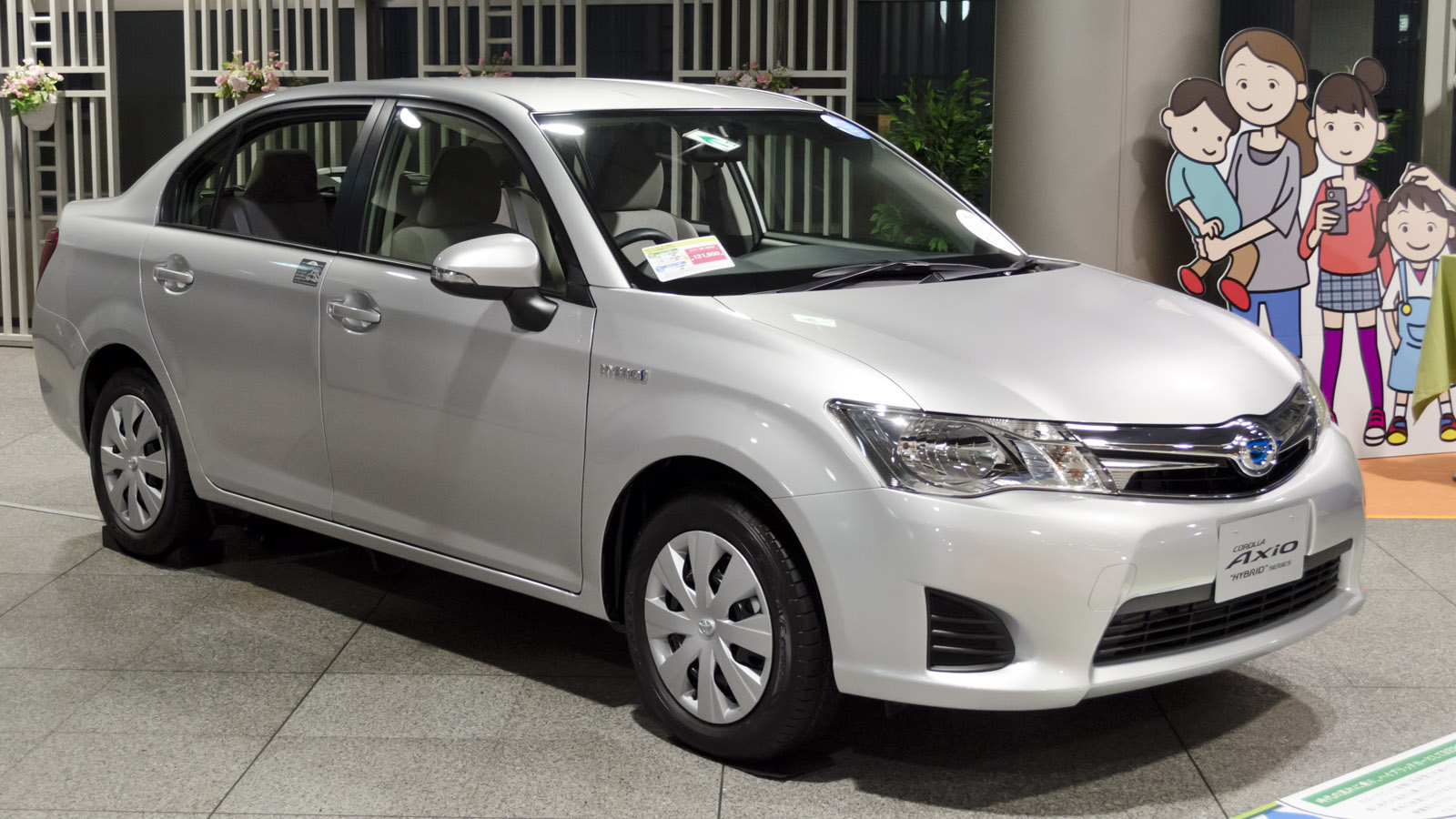

Overview
- Manufacturer: Toyota
- Model code: E160
- Production: May 2012 – June 2019 (normal sales); June 2019 – October 2025 (fleet sales)
- Assembly: Japan: Ōhira, Miyagi (Miyagi Ohira plant); Susono, Shizuoka (Higashi Fuji plant, Corolla Fielder and export models)
- Designer: Hiroya Fujita (2010); Shinichi Yasui (facelifts: 2013, 2015)

Body and chassis
- Class: Compact car
- Body style: 4-door sedan; 5-door station wagon (Fielder)
- Layout: Front-engine, front-wheel-drive; Front-engine, four-wheel-drive
- Platform: Toyota B platform

Powertrain
- Engine: 1.3 L 1NR-FE I4; 1.5 L 1NZ-FE I4; 1.5 L 1NZ-FXE I4 (hybrid); 1.8 L 2ZR-FE I4
- Transmission: 5-speed manual; CVT

Dimensions
- Wheelbase: 2,600 mm (102.4 in)
- Length: 4,360 mm (171.7 in) (2012–2014); 4,400 mm (173.2 in) (2015–2025)
- Width: 1,695 mm (66.7 in)
- Height: 1,460–1,465 mm (57.5–57.7 in); 1,485 mm (58.5 in) (4WD); 1,475–1,500 mm (58.1–59.1 in) (Fielder)
- Curb weight: 1,050–1,200 kg (2,315–2,646 lb); 1,105–1,135 kg (2,436–2,502 lb) (Fielder)

Chronology
- Predecessor: Toyota Corolla (E140; narrow-body); Toyota Belta (Japan)
- Successor: Toyota Corolla (E210; narrow-body) (Japan)

The Toyota Corolla (E160) is the eleventh generation of the Toyota Corolla that is sold in Japan, Hong Kong, Macau, New Zealand, Bangladesh, Singapore, and Sri Lanka. For international markets, the larger and substantially different Corolla (E170/E180) is offered instead. The E160 was derived from the Toyota B platform, unlike the E170/E180, which was based on the New MC platform.

As with the preceding E140 models, the sedan/saloon version of the E160 is named Corolla Axio in the Japanese market; the station wagon/estate version carries the Corolla Fielder designation. The Japanese market Corolla Axio is shorter in length and narrower in width than the global version (E170), and engines are kept below 2.0-litres, to comply with Japanese government dimension regulations so that Japanese buyers have a reduced road tax.

The eleventh generation of the Corolla went on sale in Japan in May 2012. Both are made by a Toyota subsidiary, Central Motors, in Miyagi prefecture, Japan.

== Lineup ==
Trim levels available for the Axio are Luxel (1.5 only, later replaced by the W×B package for G), G, and X. This is also true for the Corolla Fielder (wagon variant), although the Fielder also includes a 1.8S and a 1.8S AeroTourer W×B (later replaced by 1.8S W×B) trim. In 2019, both the Fielder and Axio were streamlined into one trim EX, designed for fleet use upon the launch of the E210 series Corolla and Corolla Touring.

Toyota released hybrid versions of the Corolla Axio sedan and Corolla Fielder station wagon for the Japanese market in August 2013. Both cars are equipped with a 1.5-litre hybrid system similar to the one used in the Toyota Prius c, with a fuel efficiency of 3.03 L/100 km (93.2 mpg_{‑imp}; 77.6 mpg_{‑US}) under the JC08 test cycle.

The Mitsuoka Ryugi sedan and wagon for the Japanese market were based on the E160 Corolla.

== Engines ==
Grade	Model code	Displacement, engine code	Power, Torque	Transmission
1.3X / X 'G Edition' (Axio only)	NRE160	1,329 cc (1.3 L) I4 (1NR-FE)	95 PS (70 kW) at 6000 rpm, 121 N⋅m (89 lb⋅ft) at 4000 rpm	Super CVT-i
1.5 G (W×B) / X / EX	NRE161	1,496 cc (1.5 L) I4 (2NR-FKE)	109 PS (80 kW) at 6000 rpm, 136 N⋅m (100 lb⋅ft) at 4400 rpm	Super CVT-i
1.5 G (W×B) / X / EX	NZE161; NZE164 (4WD)	1,496 cc (1.5 L) I4 (1NZ-FE)	110 PS (81 kW) at 6000 rpm, 138 N⋅m (102 lb⋅ft) at 4400 rpm	Super CVT-i / 5-speed manual
Luxel	NZE161; NZE164 (4WD)	1,496 cc (1.5 L) I4 (1NZ-FE)	110 PS (81 kW) at 6000 rpm, 136 N⋅m (100 lb⋅ft) at 4800 rpm	Super CVT-i
Hybrid / Hybrid EX / Hybrid G (W×B)	NKE165	1,496 cc (1.5 L) I4 (1NZ-FXE)	74 PS (54 kW) at 4800 rpm, 111 N⋅m (82 lb⋅ft) at 3600-4400 rpm	E-CVT
1.8S (Fielder only)	ZRE162	1,797 cc (1.8 L) I4 (2ZR-FE)	140 PS (103 kW) at 6200 rpm, 173 N⋅m (128 lb⋅ft) at 4000 rpm	Super CVT-i with 7-speed sports sequential shiftmatic with sport mode

== Markets ==
=== Hong Kong ===
In Hong Kong, the Corolla was based on the Japanese market model, initially available with the 1.5-litre 1NZ-FE engine in Advantage and Luxury trim levels. The smaller 1.5 L engine and car size contributes to a lower vehicle license levy.

In April 2015, Toyota in Hong Kong released the facelift model with the 1.5-litre 2NR-FKE engine in Luxury and Super Luxury trim levels.

The Corolla sold in Hong Kong is made in Japan, although it does vary from the Japanese market model with minor revisions to the interior, such as the inclusion of the tachometer and automatic climate air conditioning control in the Super Luxury variant.

=== New Zealand ===
The wagon is also sold in New Zealand, aimed primarily at business and fleet customers. Available solely in GX trim, it includes a tachometer, but otherwise is very similar to the Japanese model wagon. Manual transmission and CVT are both available. Toyota New Zealand released the facelift model in July 2015.

== Facelifts ==
In April 2015, Toyota released the facelift versions of the Corolla Axio and Corolla Fielder in Japan. This version featured a raised front bumper, revised headlamps with LED projector lens and grille, revised front fenders, revised tail lamps, and "Toyota Safety Sense" collision avoidance system.

On 10 October 2017, Toyota released a second facelift to the Corolla Axio and Corolla Fielder in Japan. This version featured a revised front bumper and grille, an intelligent clearance sonar (parking support brake), and standard "Toyota Safety Sense".

The E160 Corolla was mainly replaced by the larger E210 Corolla in September 2019. However, it remained in production exclusively for fleet sales. On 27 August 2019, the EX trim was announced, replacing all the previous trims, specializing in demand for business users. The engine lineup includes 1.5-litre petrol and 1.5-litre hybrid versions, with "Toyota Safety Sense" and a keyless entry and start system as standard equipment, and all colour variations reduced to four for both body styles.

In 2022, a minor third facelift occurred that added smoked-out headlights and taillights and standard LED projection lights.

== Mitsuoka Ryugi (2014–2026) ==
An aftermarket modified version of the E160 Corolla by Mitsuoka called the Mitsuoka Ryugi was released in June 2014, replaced the Nouera which based on E140 Corolla. Initially only offered as sedan. Five grades are available: 15ST (equivalent to the 1.5 X), 15DX (equivalent to the 1.5 G), 15LX (equivalent to the 1.5 Luxel), Hybrid (equivalent to the Hybrid G), and Hybrid with heated seats (equivalent to the Hybrid G with heated seats). It was equipped with Toyota Safety Sense C.

The Wagon was added in January 2016. Unlike the mass-produced Corolla Regular, the Ryugi is hand-made. Three grades are available: 15ST, 15DX, and Hybrid.

The front fascia harkens back to the Rolls-Royce Silver Cloud II which also used in the larger Galue. The Mitsuoka Ryugi was discontinued in 2026.

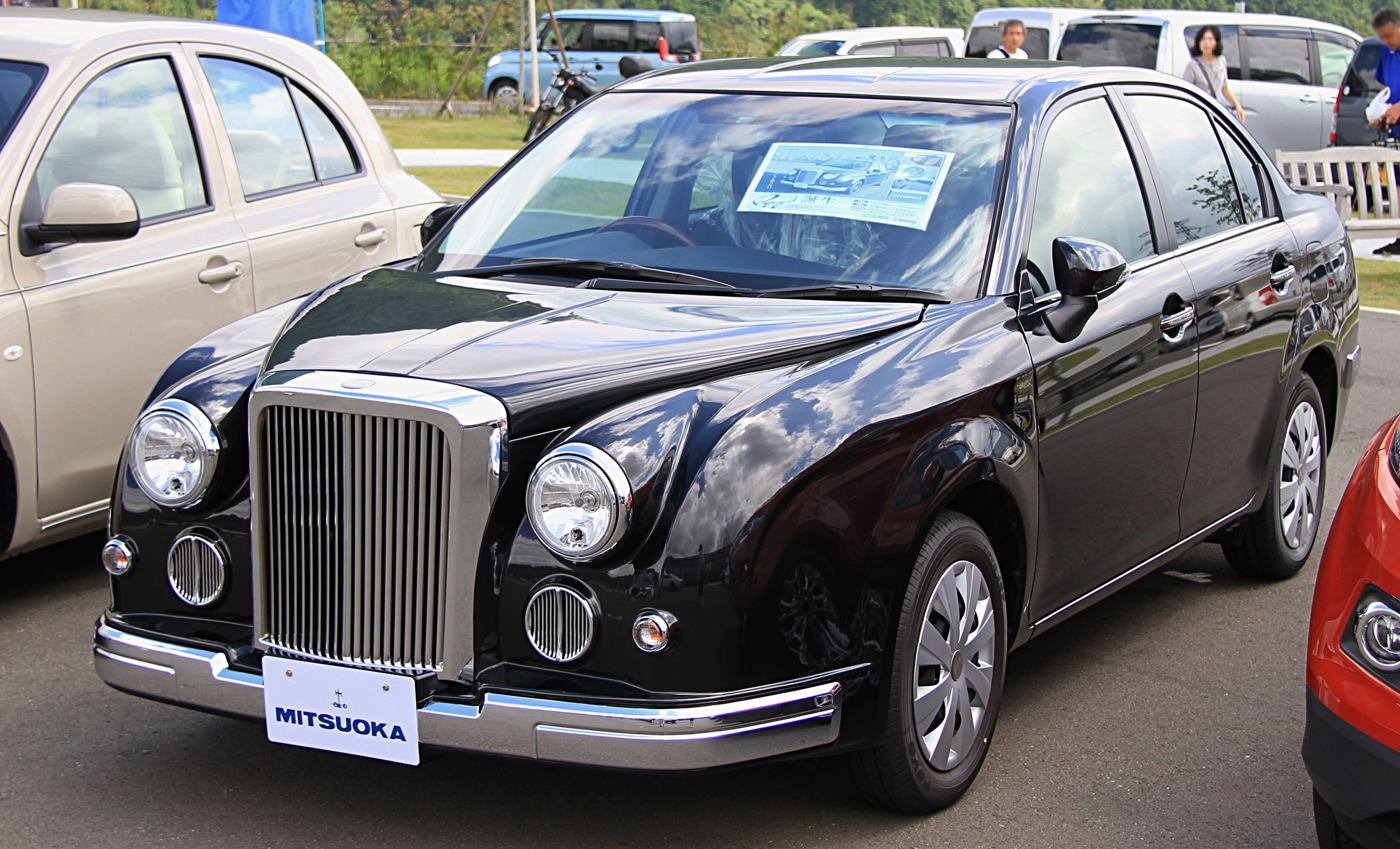
Mitsuoka Ryugi Sedan

rear view (Sedan)

rear view (Wagon)

== Discontinuation ==
In February 2025, Toyota announced that production of the Corolla Axio and Corolla Fielder would end in October 2025 after 13 years.

== Gallery ==
Corolla Axio

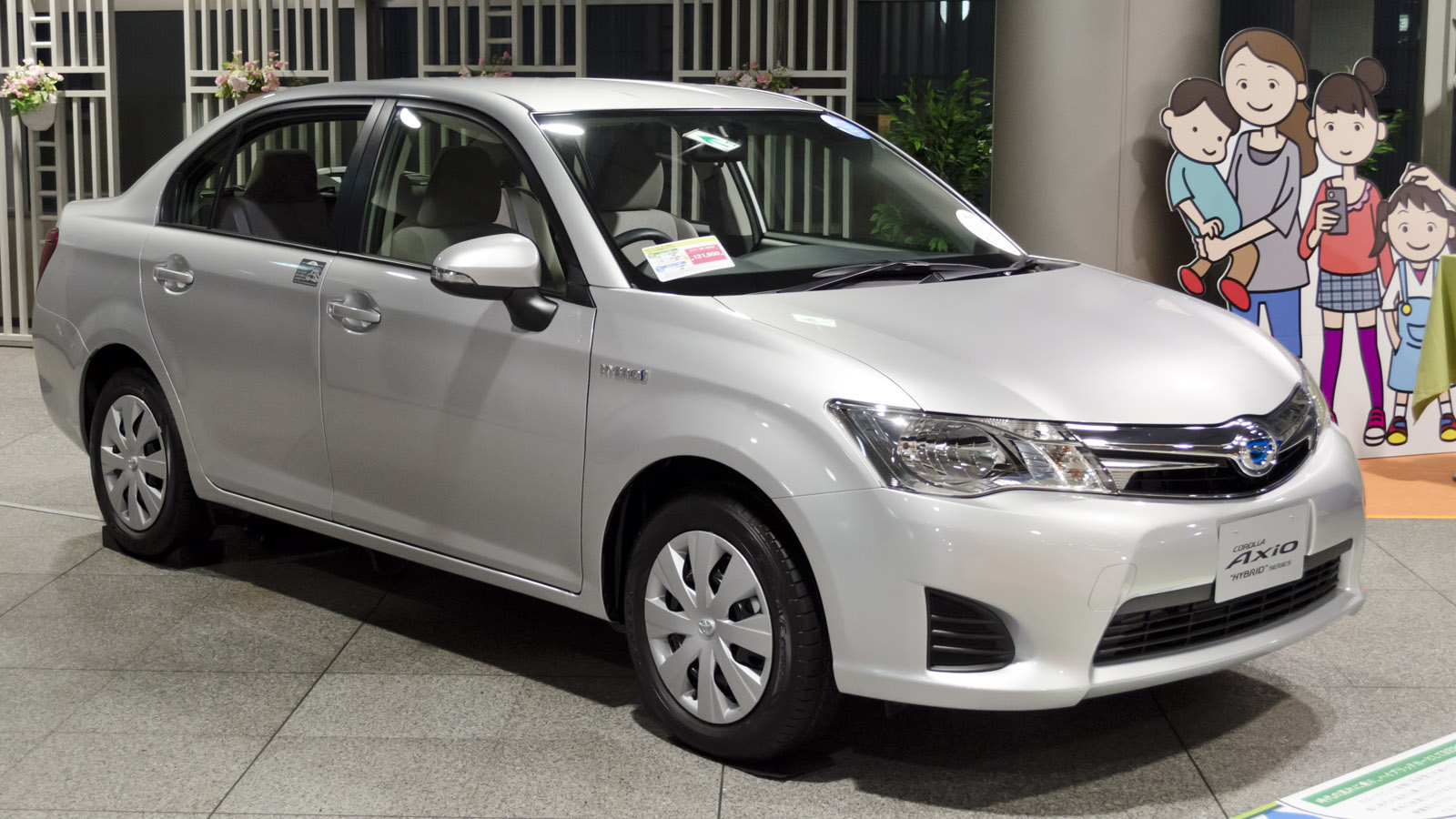
Corolla Axio Hybrid (Japan; pre-facelift)

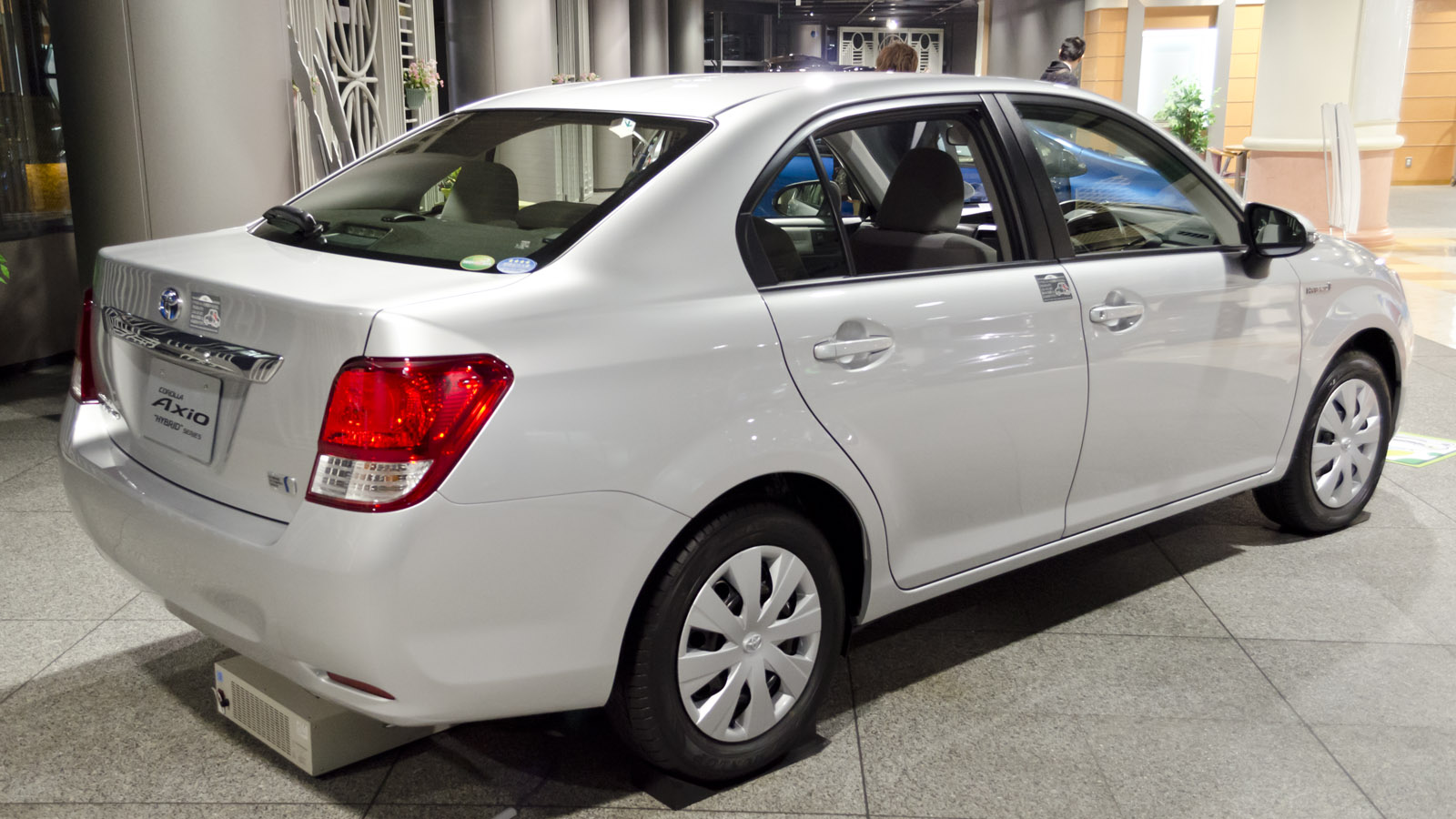
Corolla Axio Hybrid (Japan; pre-facelift)

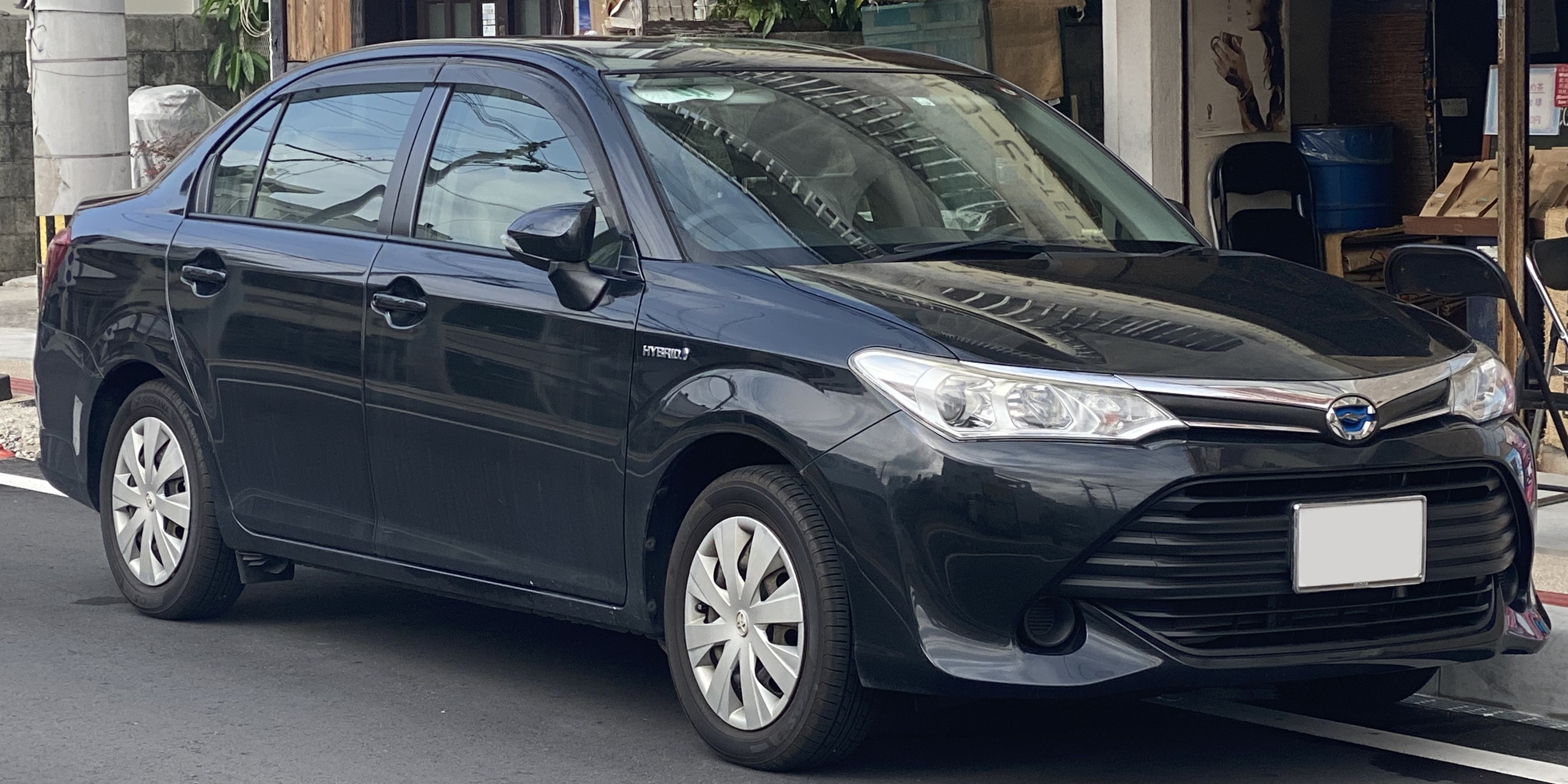
Corolla Axio Hybrid (Japan; first facelift)

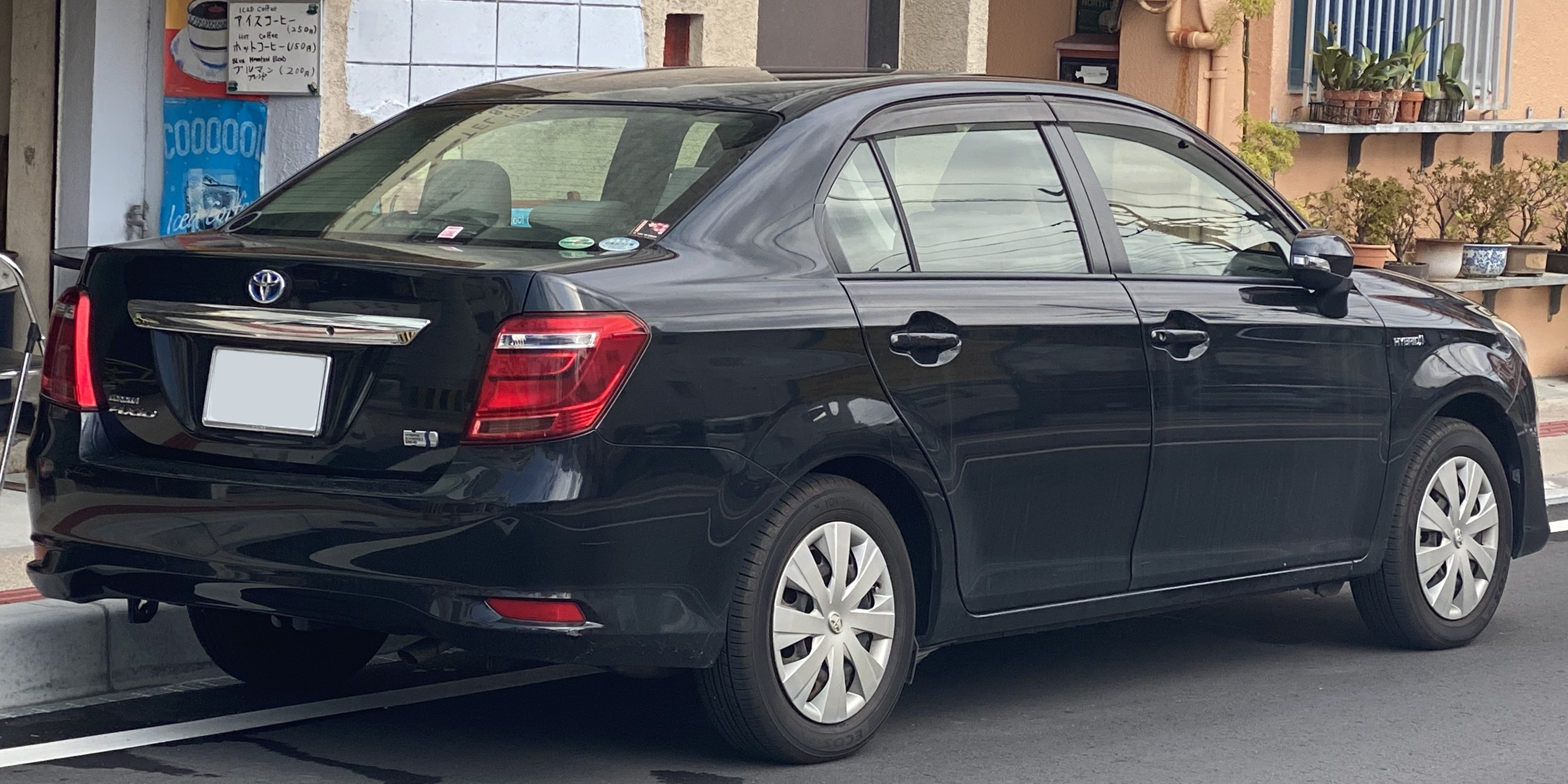
Corolla Axio Hybrid (Japan; first facelift)

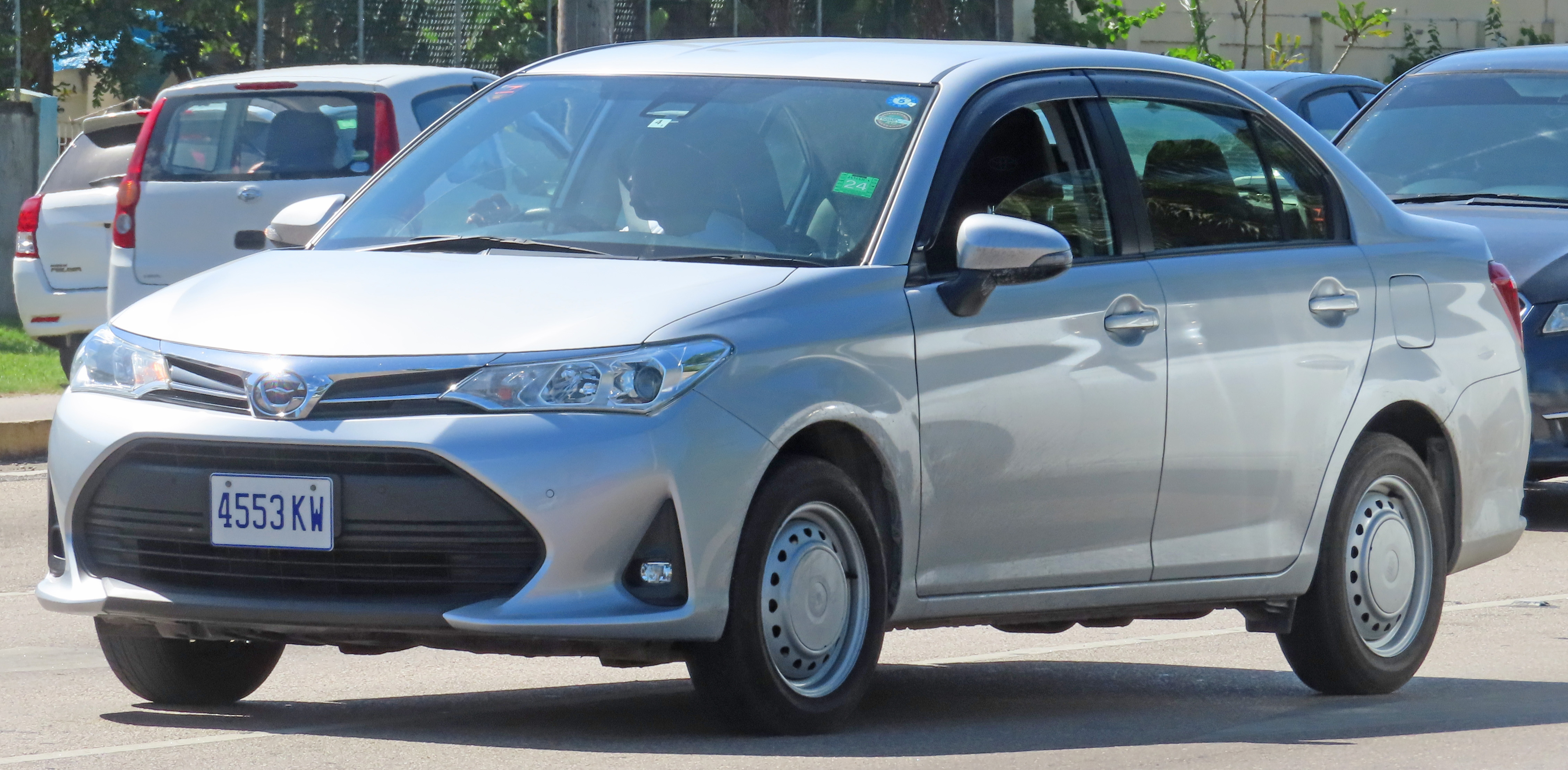
Corolla Axio (Japan; second facelift)

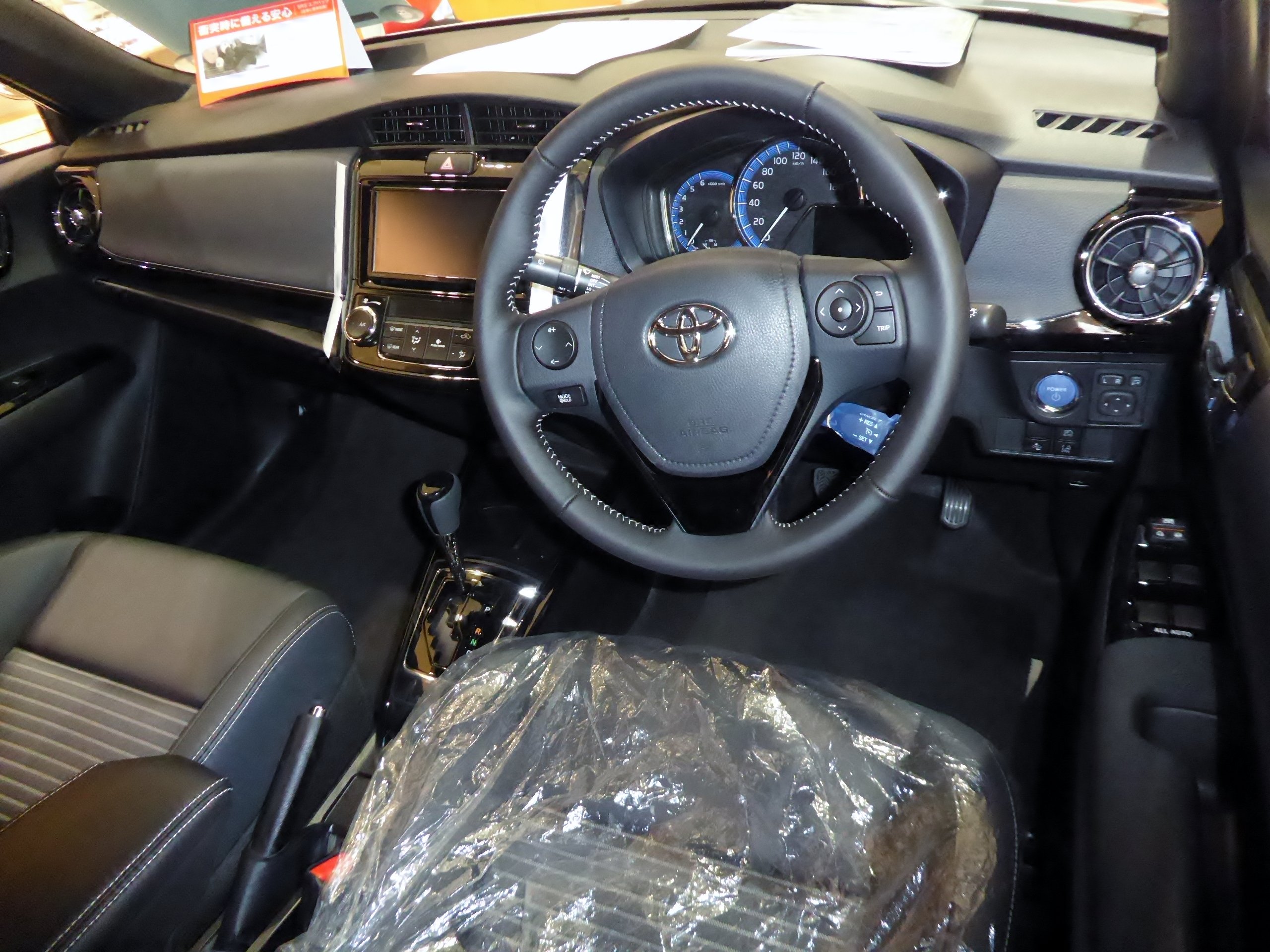
Interior

Corolla Fielder

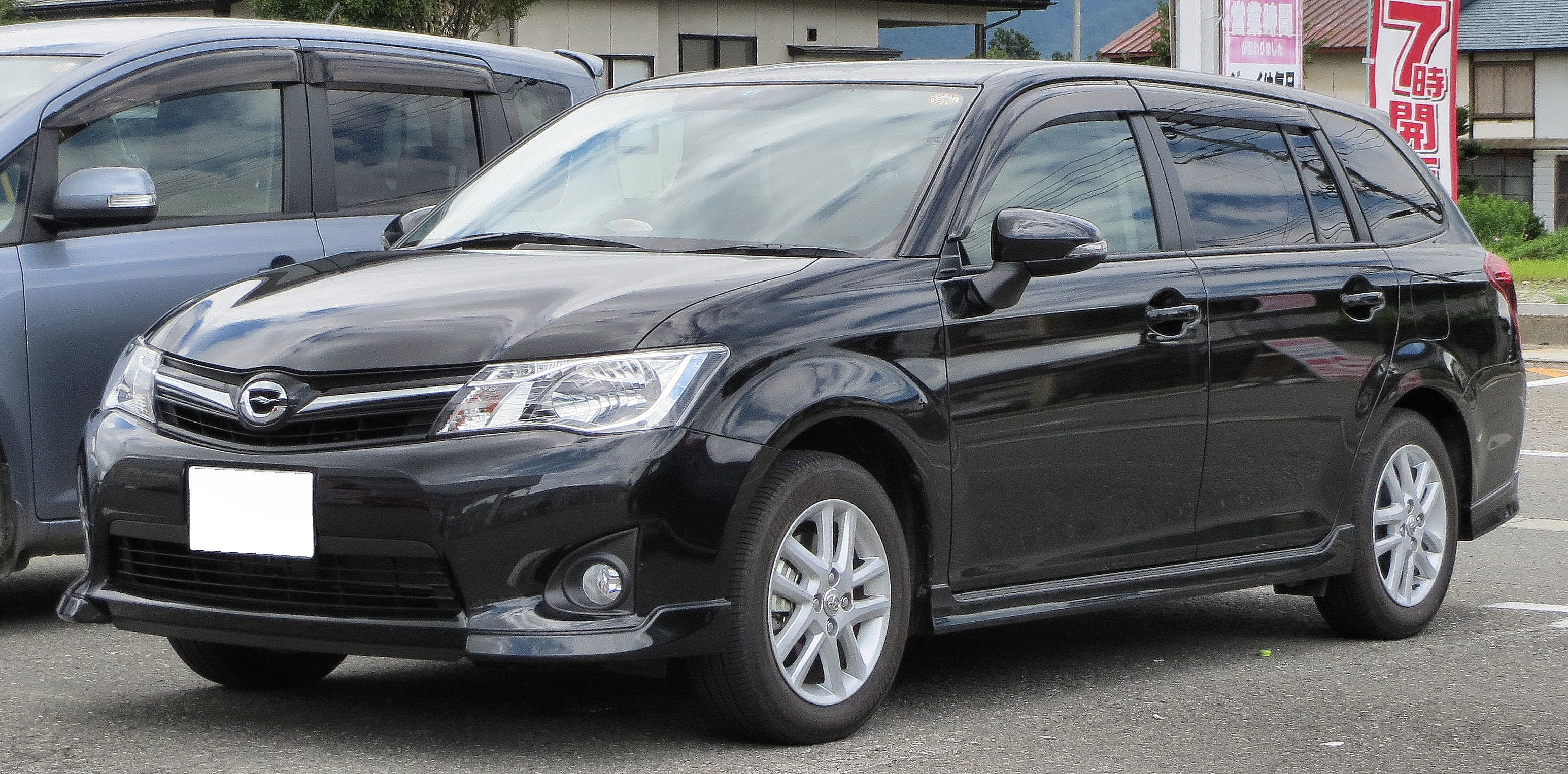
Corolla Fielder 1.5G AeroTourer (Japan; pre-facelift)

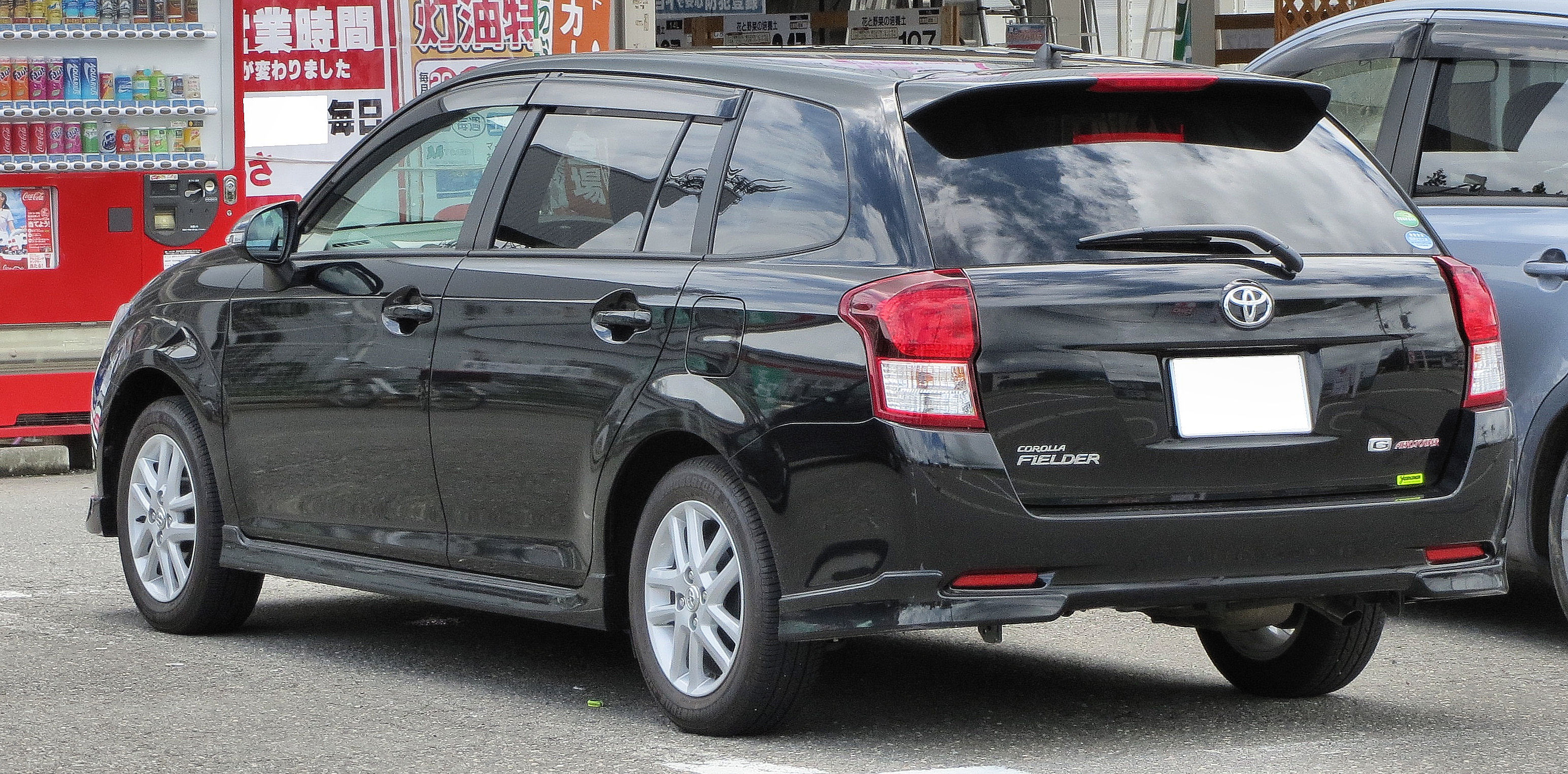
Corolla Fielder 1.5G AeroTourer (Japan; pre-facelift)

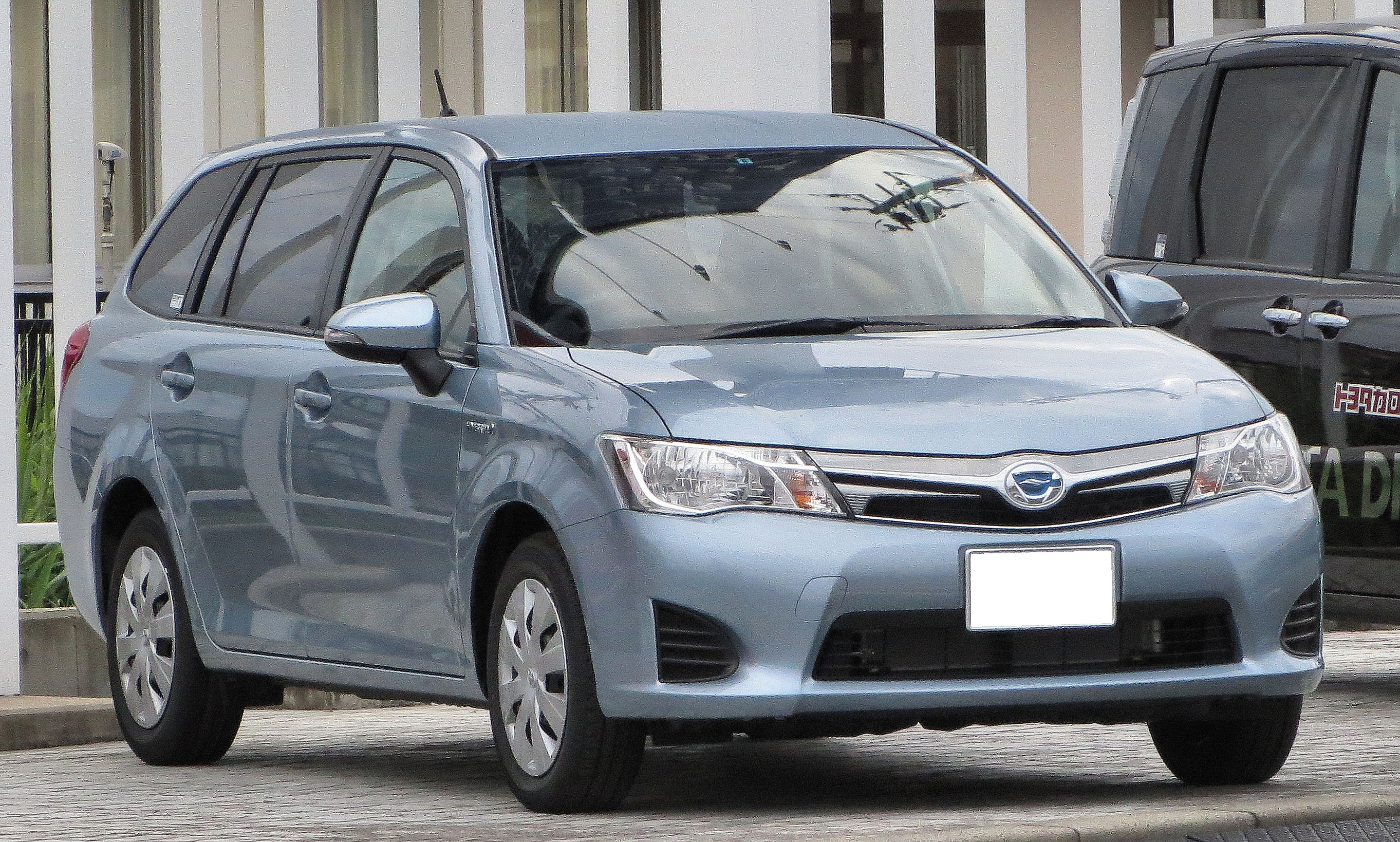
Corolla Fielder Hybrid (Japan; pre-facelift)

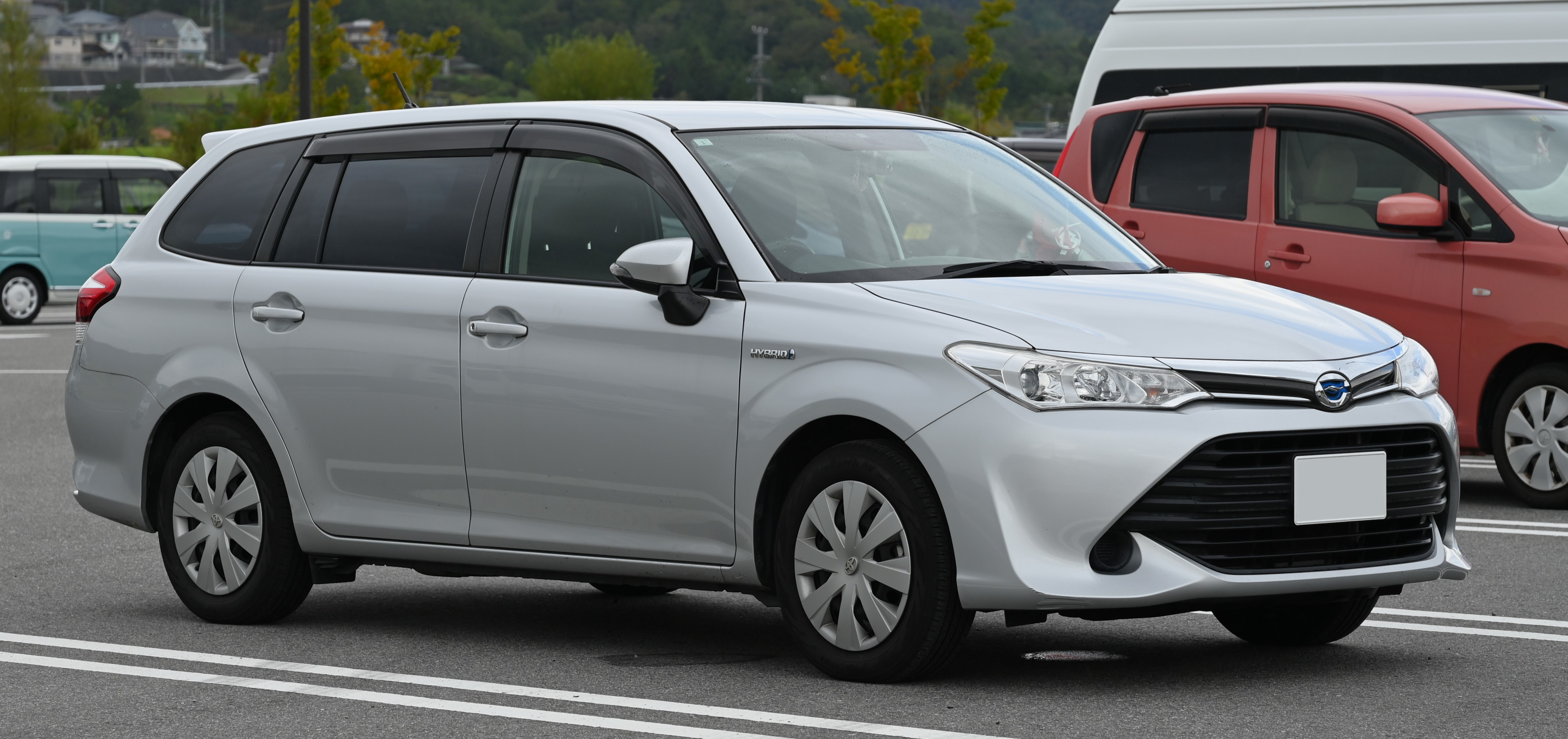
Corolla Fielder Hybrid (Japan; first facelift)

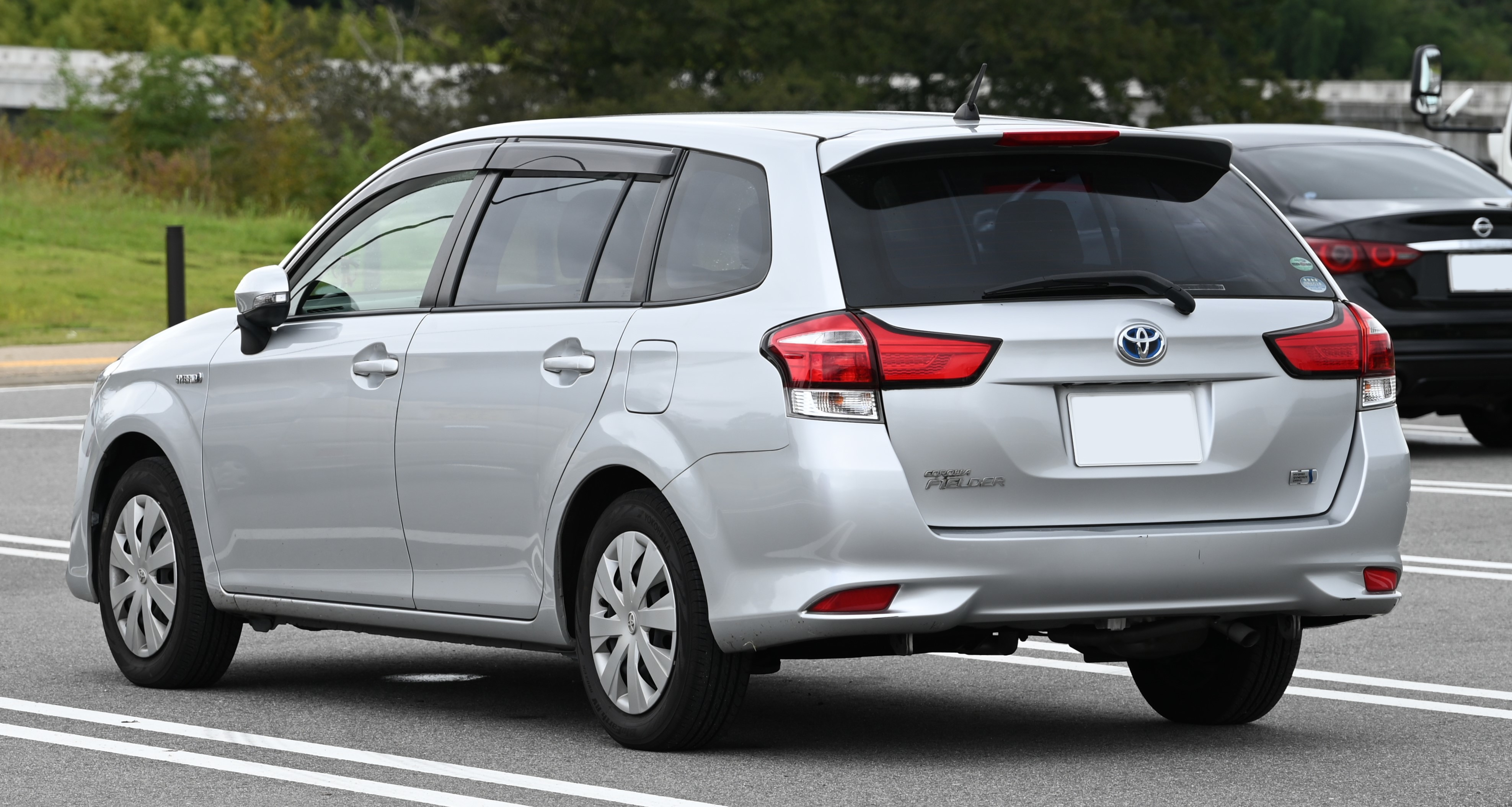
Corolla Fielder Hybrid (Japan; first facelift)

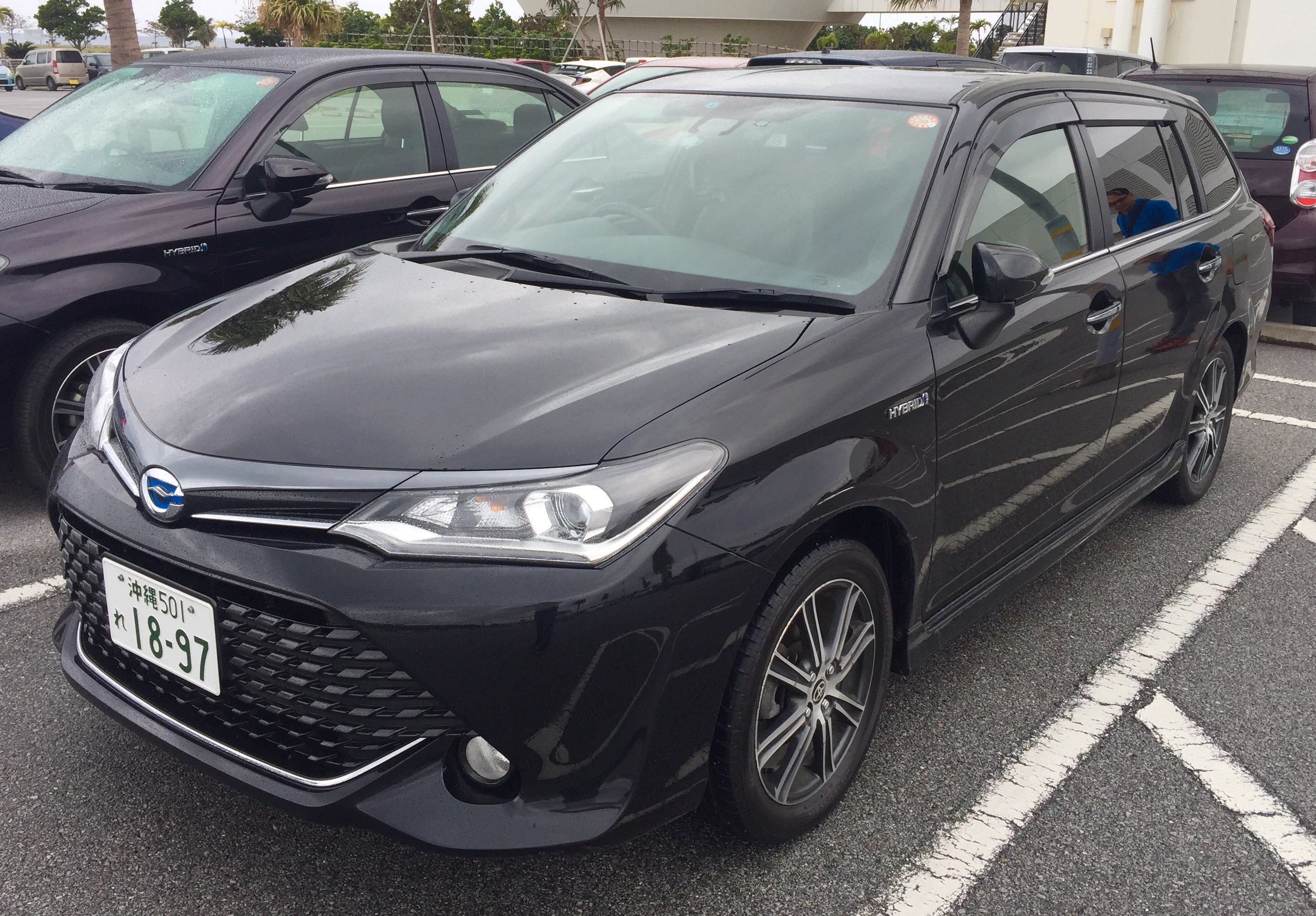
Corolla Fielder Hybrid W×B (Japan; first facelift)

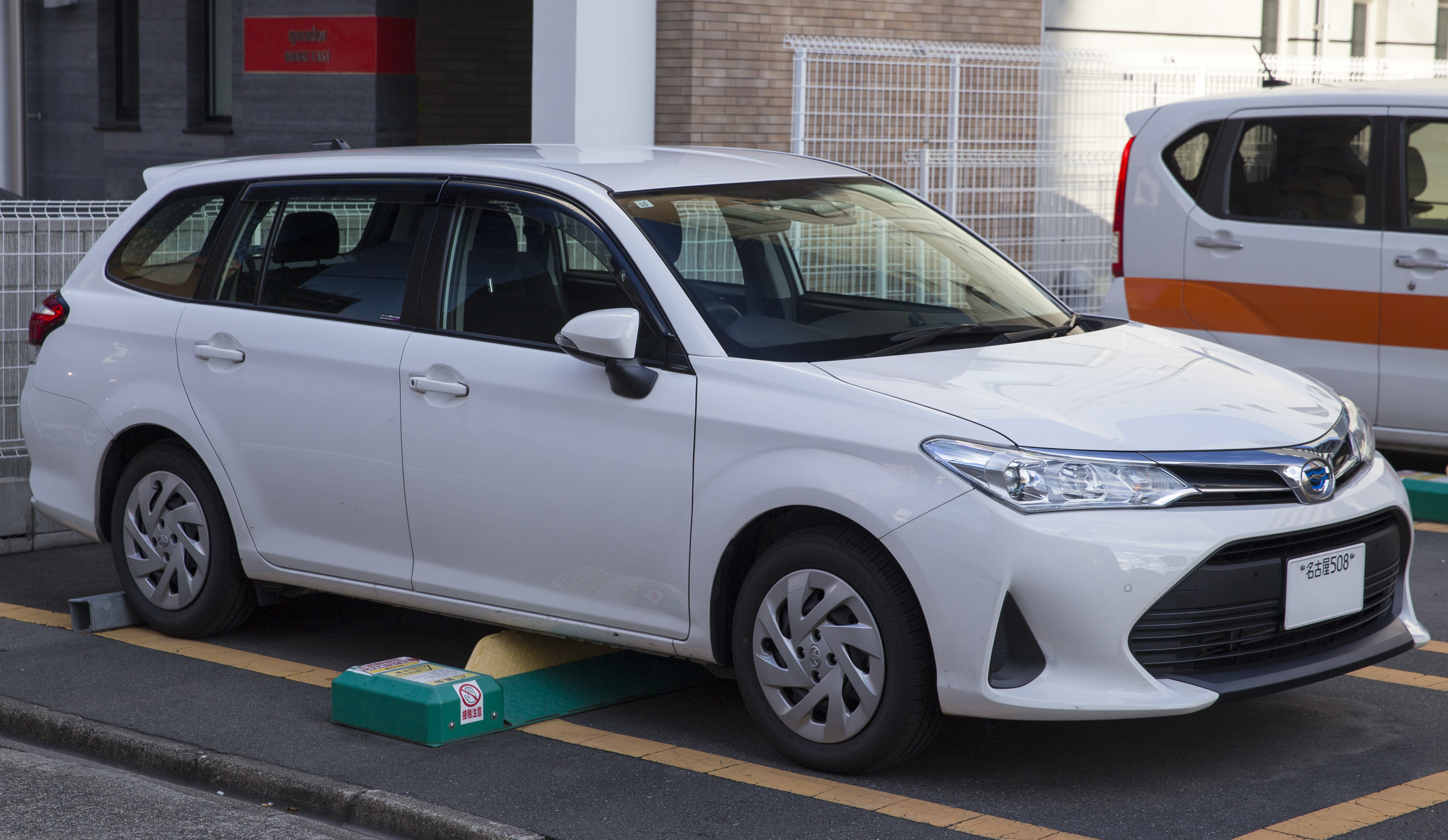
Corolla Fielder Hybrid EX (Japan; second facelift)

Preceded by Corolla (E140)	Toyota Corolla (E160); 2012–present	Succeeded by Corolla (E210)
