= SP100 =

SP100 may refer to:

- SP-100, a research program for space-based fission reactor
- All-Crop SP100, a combine harvester
- Pulsar SP100, an ultralight aircraft
- Saipa Shahin, an Iranian sedan
- Sp100 nuclear antigen, encoded by the SP100 gene

== See also ==
- S&P 100, a stock market index
