= Saipa Aria =

Iranian compact crossover SUV

Saipa Aria (SP100 Crossover)
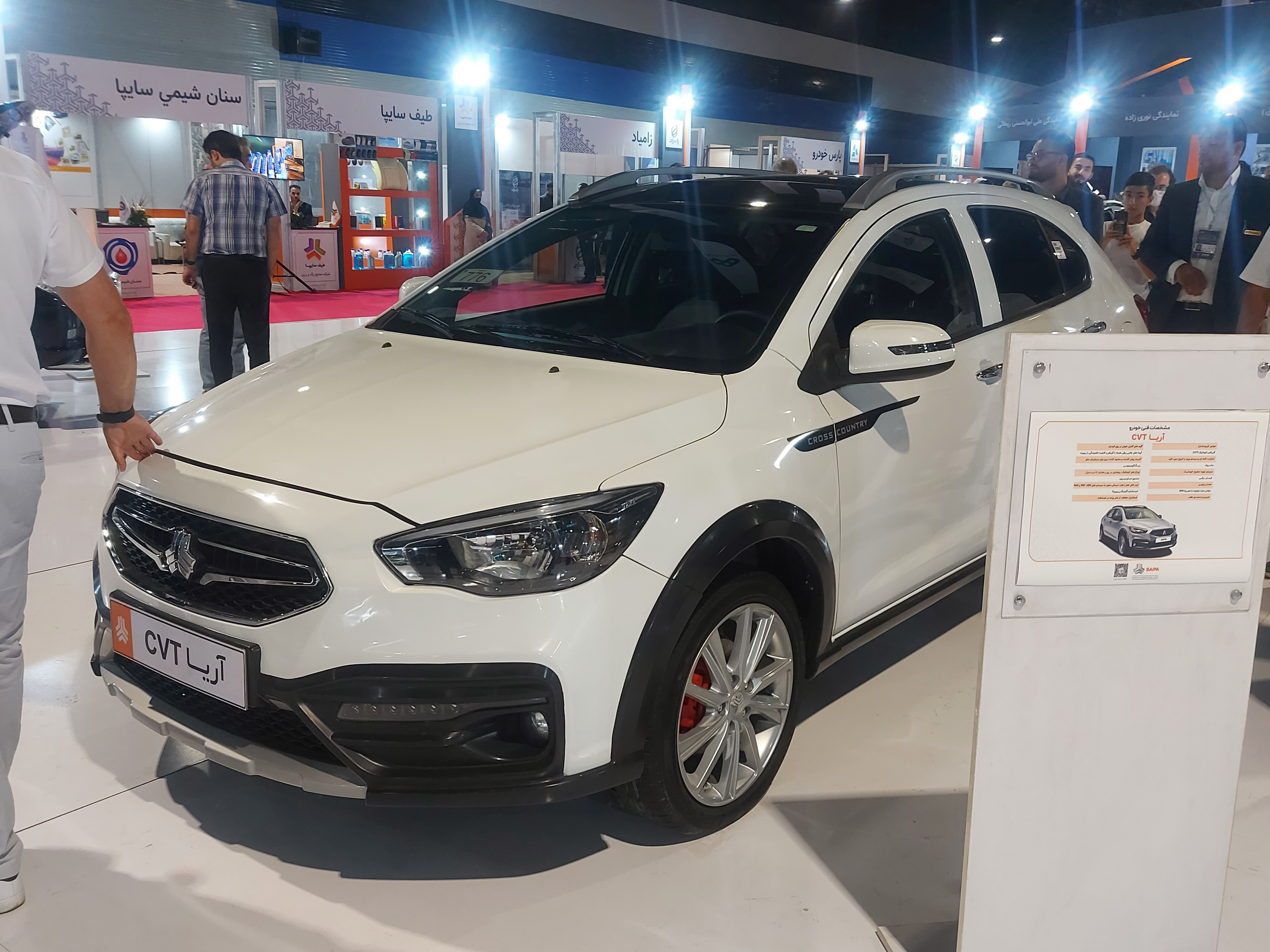

Overview
- Manufacturer: SAIPA
- Production: 2023–present
- Assembly: Iran

Body and chassis
- Class: Compact crossover (C-segment)
- Body style: 4-door compact crossover SUV
- Layout: Front-engine, front-wheel-drive layout
- Platform: SAIPA SP1 platform (upgraded Toyota B platform)
- Related: Saipa Shahin (sedan version)

Powertrain
- Engine: 1.6L ME16 I4 (Petrol); 2.0L 4J20V I4 (Petrol)
- Power output: 115 hp (86 kW; 117 PS); 147 N⋅m (108 lb⋅ft) of torque (ME16); 115 hp (86 kW; 117 PS); 147 N⋅m (108 lb⋅ft) of torque (4J20V)
- Transmission: 6-Speed Automatic

The Saipa Aria (Persian: سایپا آریا; code name: SP100 Crossover) is a compact crossover SUV (C-segment) unveiled in 2020 by Iranian manufacturer SAIPA. It is the first crossover produced in Iran. It is derived from the Saipa Shahin sedan.

== Overview ==
Aria is built on the SAIPA SP1 platform that has first been used for Shahin. The height of Aria is slightly higher than Shahin and it has more equipments.

=== Powertrain ===
At first, it was announced Aria will use Saipa M15TC engine, the same as the one used on Shahin. Later it was said Saipa Aria is going to be launched with a 2-liter imported engine. This engine has Mitsubishi engineering and is an upgraded example of Mitsubishi's 4G94 series, which is produced in the Chinese market by DAE company and is called 4J20V. This 4-cylinder and 16-valve naturally aspirated engine is equipped with variable valve timing technology and produces about 136 hp with a torque of 188 NM in the MPi version. But Saipa seems to have chosen the upgraded GDi version of the 4J20V engine, which produces 150 hp of power with 204 NM of torque.

In another version of this car, the Saipa ME16 engine was considered, which is a version of the PSA EC5 engine.

Aria is supposed to enter the production line with an automatic gearbox from the very beginning. This car has an automatic gearbox with AT structure and will be 6-speed. It is said that the 6AT gearbox of this crossover is supplied by the DAE company as well as the engine. Saipa Aria power transmission system delivers power to the front wheels of this car.

Engine	Type	Displacement	Power	Torque
M16	I4	1600 cc	115 hp (86 kW; 117 PS)	147 N⋅m (108 lb⋅ft)
4J20V	I4	1999 cc	150 hp (112 kW; 152 PS)	204 N⋅m (150 lb⋅ft)
