= Toyota Porte =

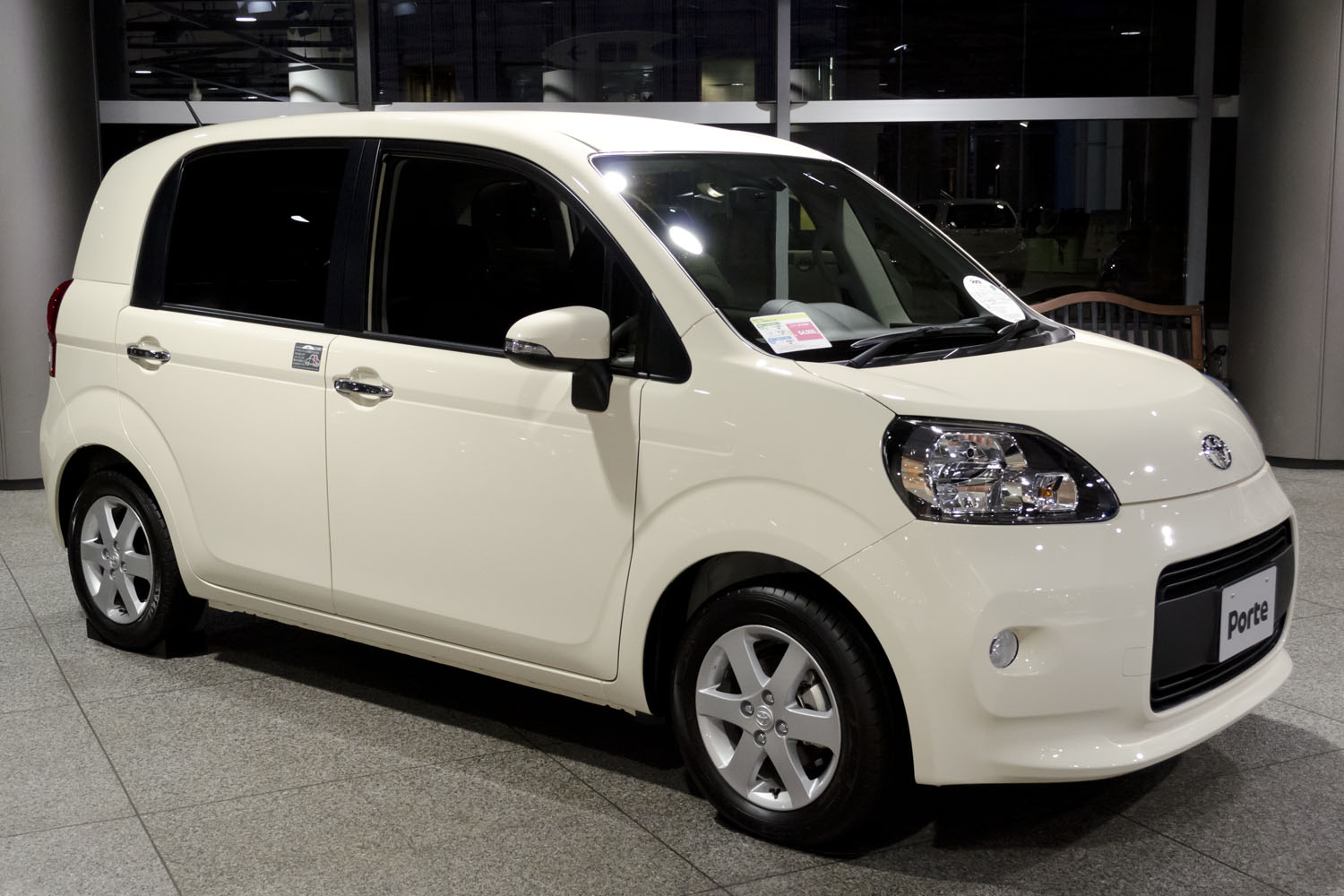
- 2012 Toyota Porte

Overview
- Manufacturer: Toyota
- Also called: Toyota Spade (2012–2020)
- Production: July 2004 – December 2020

Body and chassis
- Class: Mini MPV
- Layout: Front-engine, front-wheel-drive; Front-engine, four-wheel-drive

The Toyota Porte (Japanese: トヨタ・ポルテ, Hepburn: Toyota Porute), the plural Italian word for "door", is a mini MPV produced by the Japanese automaker Toyota from 2004 to 2020 that features an electric-powered sliding door on the passenger side, similar in approach to the Isis. The driver's door is of the conventional swing-open type.

== First generation (AP10; 2004) ==
First generation
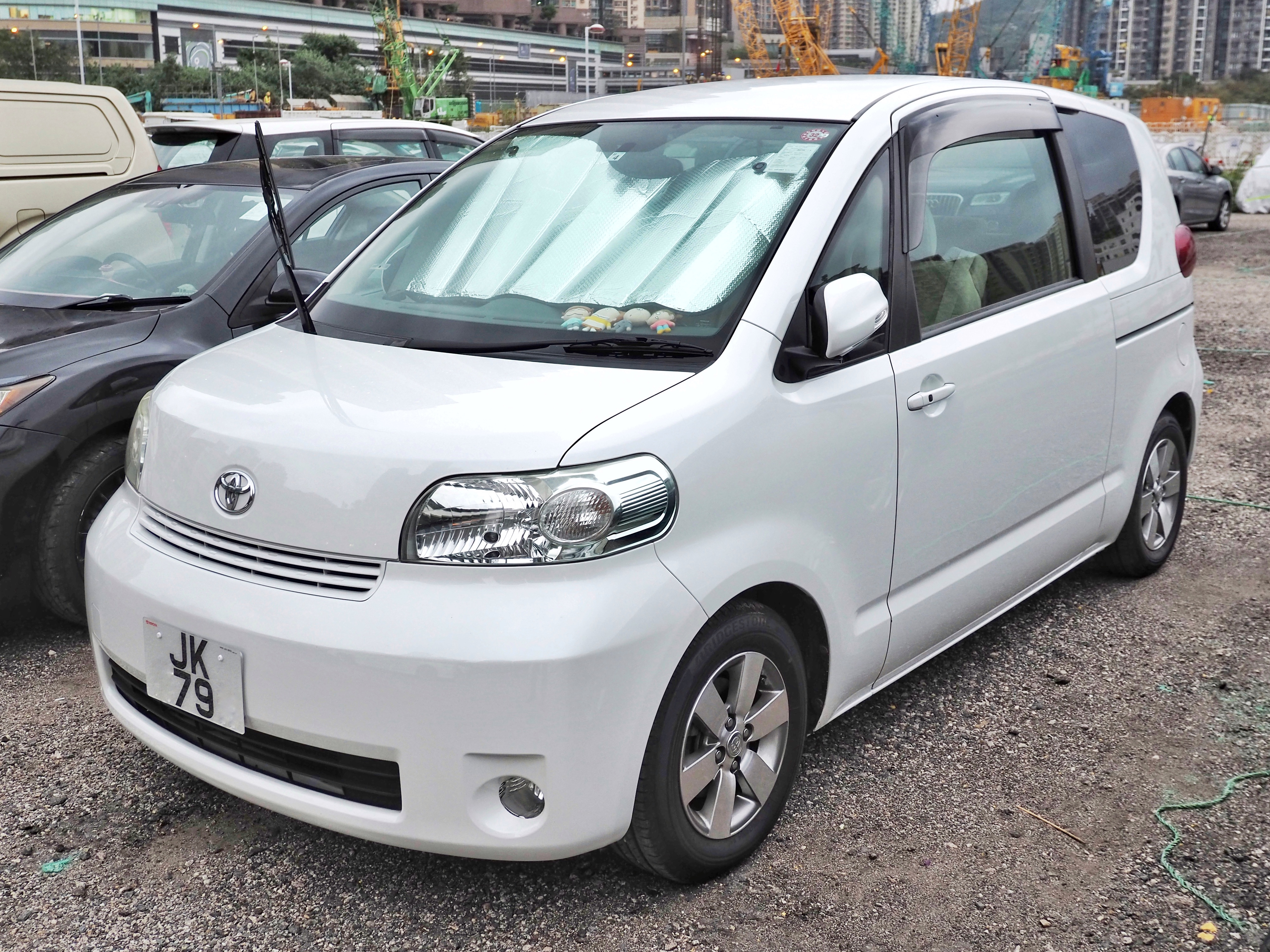

Overview
- Model code: AP10
- Production: July 2004 – July 2012
- Assembly: Japan: Ōyamazaki, Kyoto (Daihatsu)

Body and chassis
- Body style: 3-door hatchback
- Platform: Toyota NBC platform
- Related: Toyota Vitz (XP10); Toyota Sienta (XP80)

Powertrain
- Engine: Gasoline: 1.3 L 2NZ-FE I4 (NNP10); 1.5 L 1NZ-FE I4 (NNP11/15)
- Transmission: 4-speed automatic

Dimensions
- Wheelbase: 2,600 mm (102.4 in)
- Length: 3,990 mm (157.1 in)
- Width: 1,690 mm (66.5 in)
- Height: 1,720 mm (67.7 in)
- Curb weight: 1,090–1,200 kg (2,403–2,646 lb)

The Porte was introduced in July 2004, available only in Japan, and therefore only produced with right-hand drive. The Porte is based on the first generation Vitz subcompact car and is made in 4-seater and 5-seater versions.

The vehicle is powered by either a 1.3-litre or 1.5-litre gasoline engine, with automatic transmission only, and with either front-wheel drive or four-wheel drive. It was similar in concept to the 2002 Peugeot Sésame concept and the slightly smaller production model Peugeot 1007 which have electric-powered sliding doors on both sides. However, there is only a sliding door on the left, passenger side of the Porte.

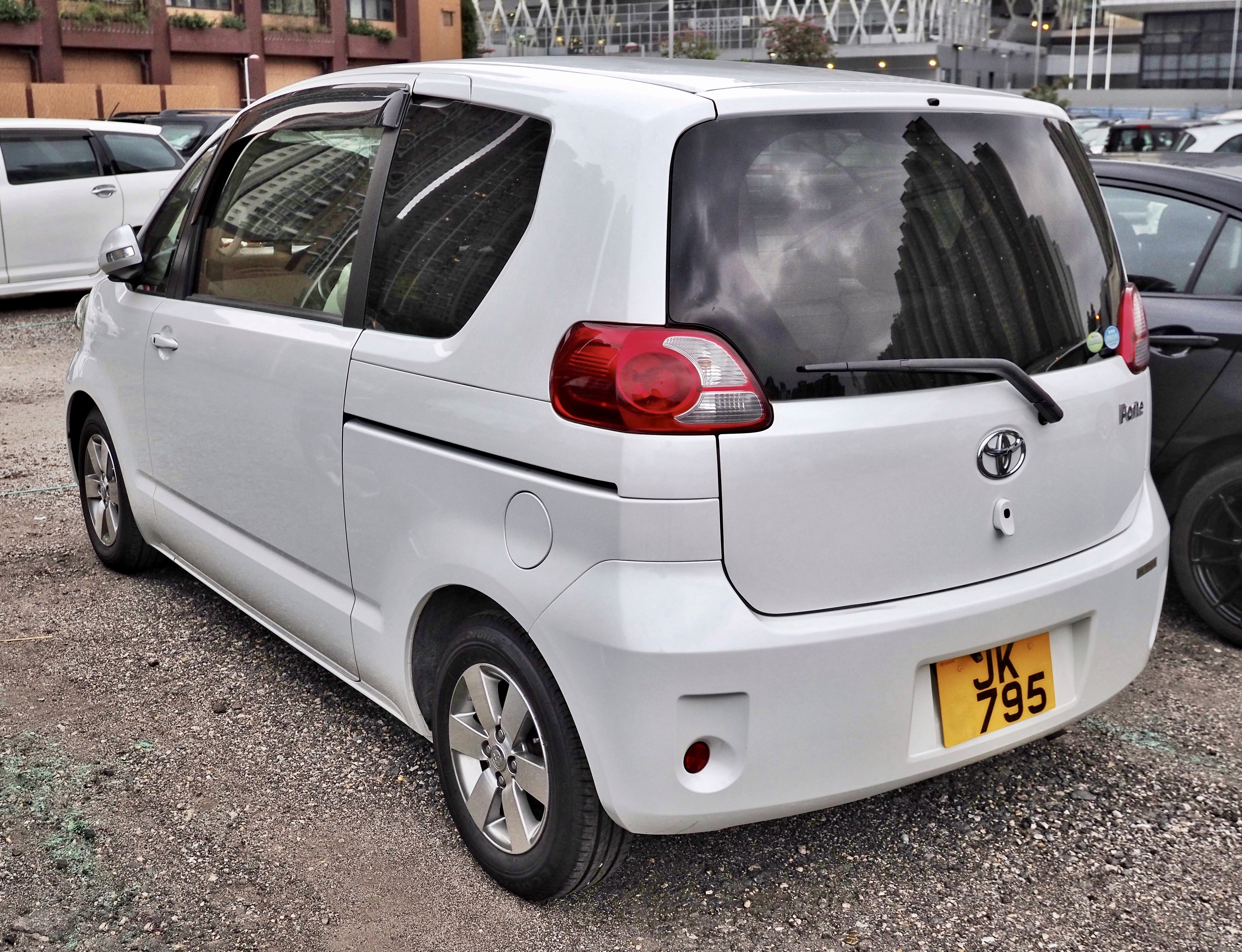
Rear view

== Second generation (XP140; 2012) ==
Second generation
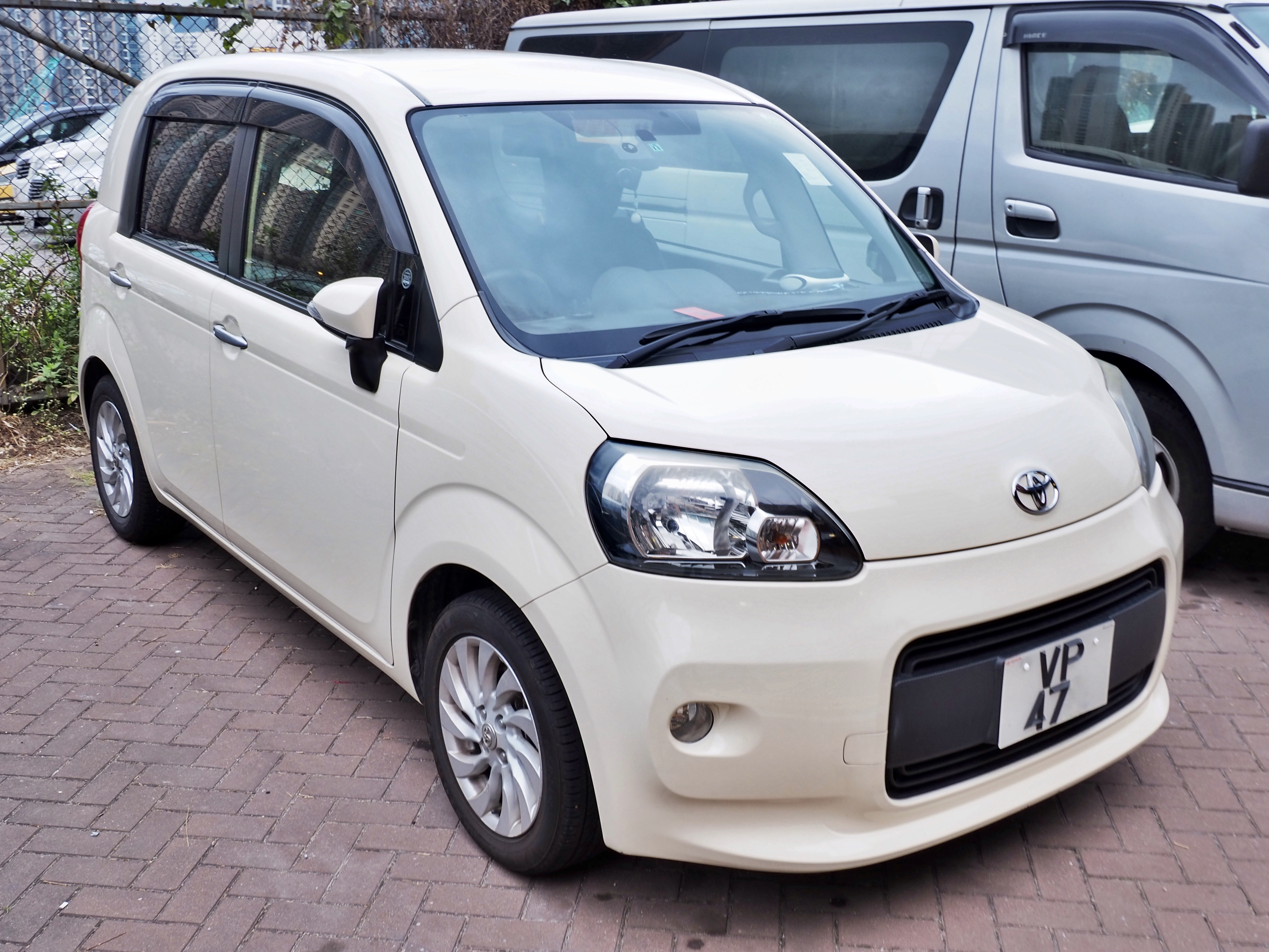

Overview
- Model code: XP140
- Also called: Toyota Spade
- Production: July 2012 – December 2020
- Assembly: Japan: Susono, Shizuoka (Toyota Motor East Japan)

Body and chassis
- Body style: 4-door hatchback
- Platform: Toyota B platform
- Related: Toyota Vitz (XP130); Toyota Sienta (XP170)

Powertrain
- Engine: Gasoline: 1.3 L 1NR-FE I4 (NSP140; 2012–2015); 1.5 L 1NZ-FE I4 (NCP141/145); 1.5 L 2NR-FKE I4 (NSP141; 2015–2020)
- Transmission: CVT

Dimensions
- Wheelbase: 2,600 mm (102.4 in)
- Length: 3,995 mm (157.3 in)
- Width: 1,695 mm (66.7 in)
- Height: 1,690 mm (66.5 in) (FWD); 1,720 mm (67.7 in) (4WD)
- Curb weight: 1,100–1,240 kg (2,425–2,734 lb)

Chronology
- Predecessor: Toyota Raum (Spade)

In July 2012, the Porte was redesigned and the Toyota Spade (Japanese: トヨタ・スペイド, Hepburn: Toyota Supeido) twin model was also introduced, sporting a different front and rear design, as well as a slightly different interior colour. The second-generation Porte was sold at Toyota Store and Toyopet Store dealerships while the Spade was sold at Corolla Store and Netz dealerships across Japan. Beginning in August 2015 the Spade was also exported to Hong Kong and Macau.

While the Spade's name is transliterated the same way as is the suit of cards, and the badging includes an image of the spade symbol, the name is actually slightly different in Japanese: supeido (スペイド) rather than supēdo (スペード). This is because the name in katakana is actually a portmanteau of the English words "space" and "wide".

In addition to the 1.3-litre 1NR-FE engine, an improved 1.5-litre 1NZ-FE engine was also introduced, mated with the Super CVT-i (Continuously Variable Transmission-intelligent) automatic transmission, an available Smart Stop feature for the 1.5-litre variants has a fuel efficiency of 20.6 km/L (58 mpg_{‑imp}; 48 mpg_{‑US}) under the JC08 test cycle (equivalent to 113 g/km (6.4 oz/mi) of CO_{2} emissions) of the Japanese Ministry of Land, Infrastructure, Transport and Tourism (MLIT). The two different engine sizes gave Japanese drivers a choice as to which annual road tax obligation they were willing to pay; vehicles with the larger engine were equipped at a higher level than the lower trim level in compensation.

In July 2015, the 1.3-litre engine option was dropped and a newer 1.5-litre 2NR-FKE engine was used for front-wheel drive models. This version has a fuel efficiency of 22.2 km/L (63 mpg_{‑imp}; 52 mpg_{‑US}) under the JC08 test cycle.

Toyota stopped production of both the Porte and Spade in December 2020.

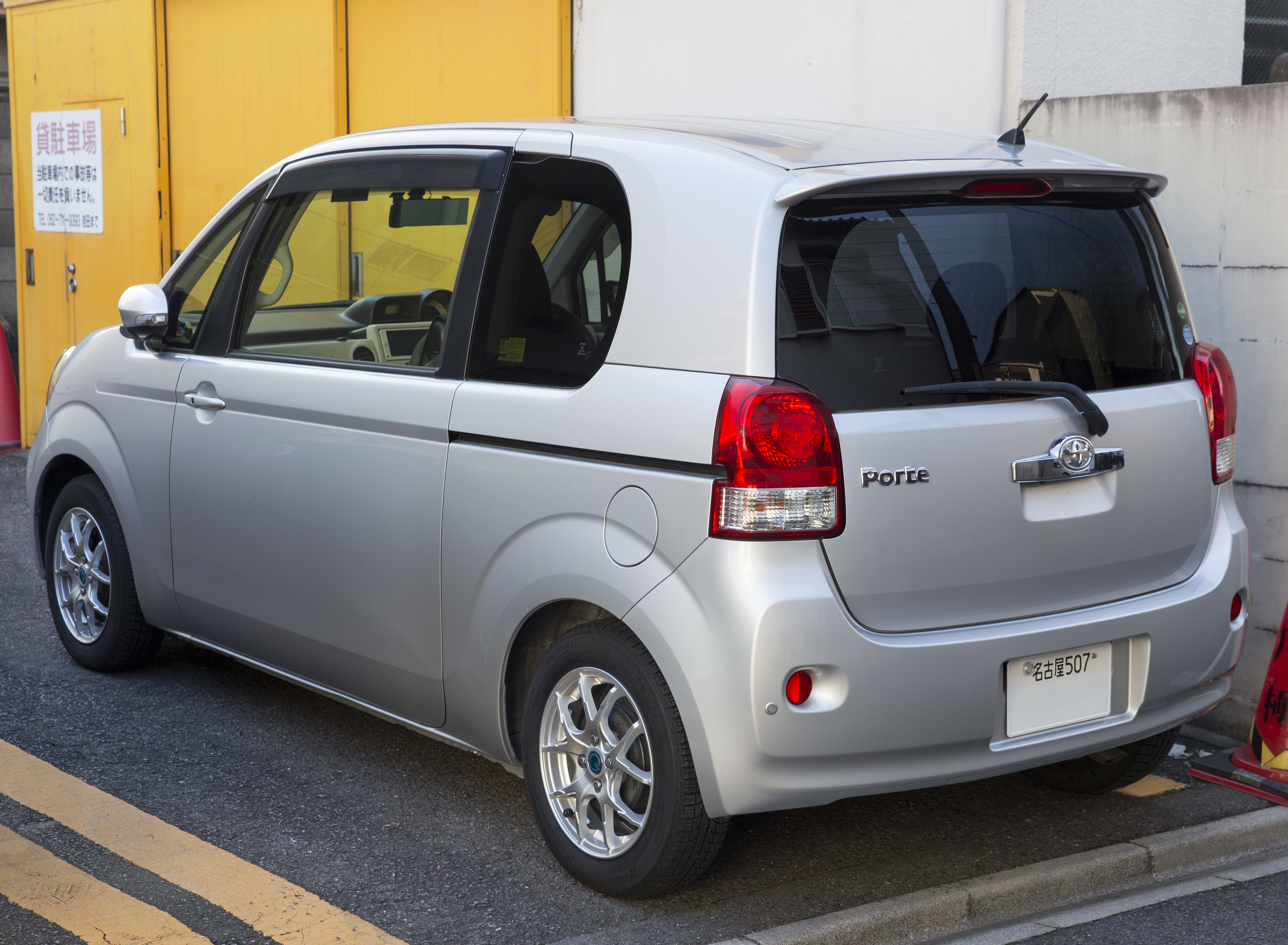
Rear view

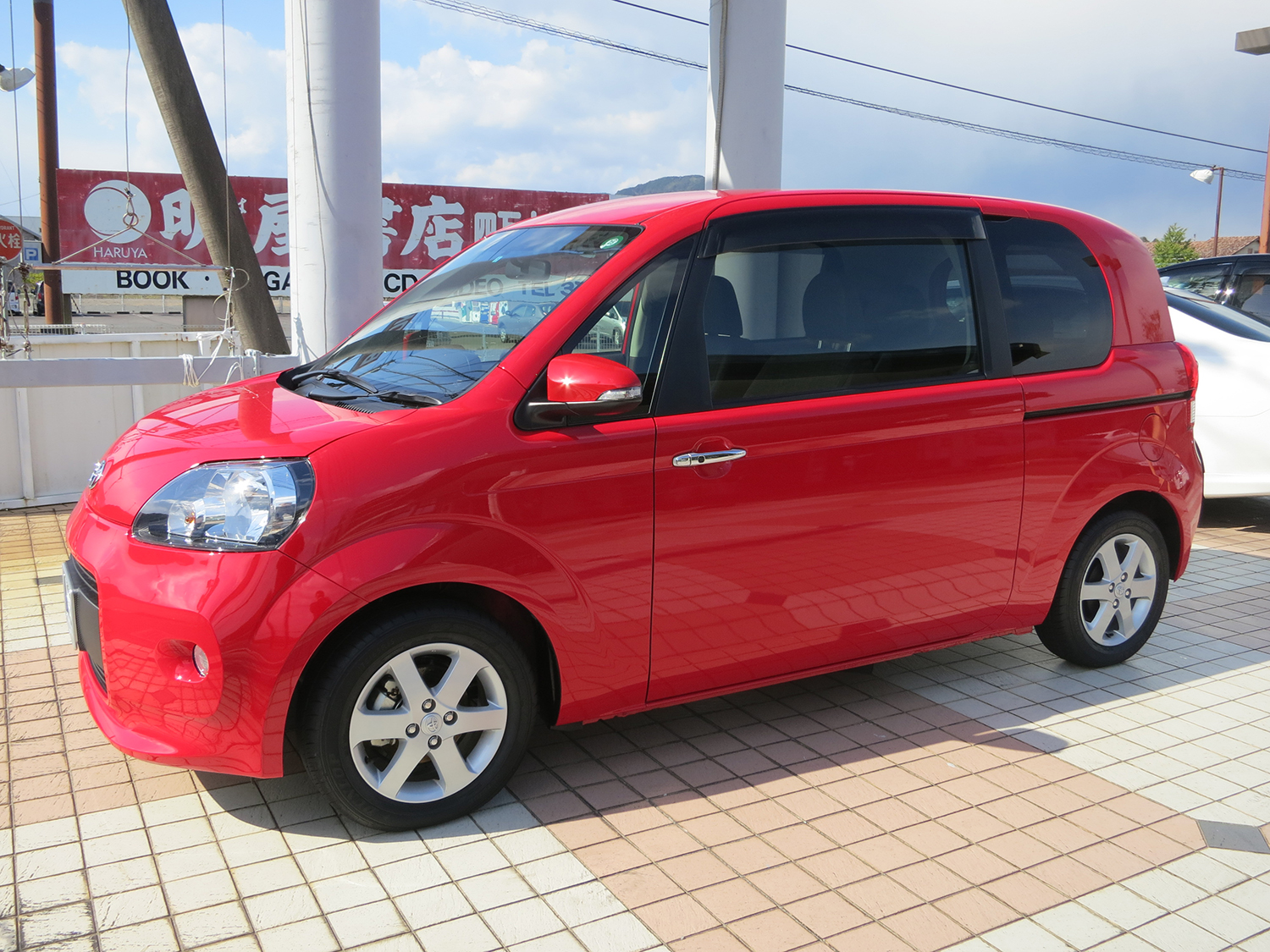
Passenger side, with single sliding door

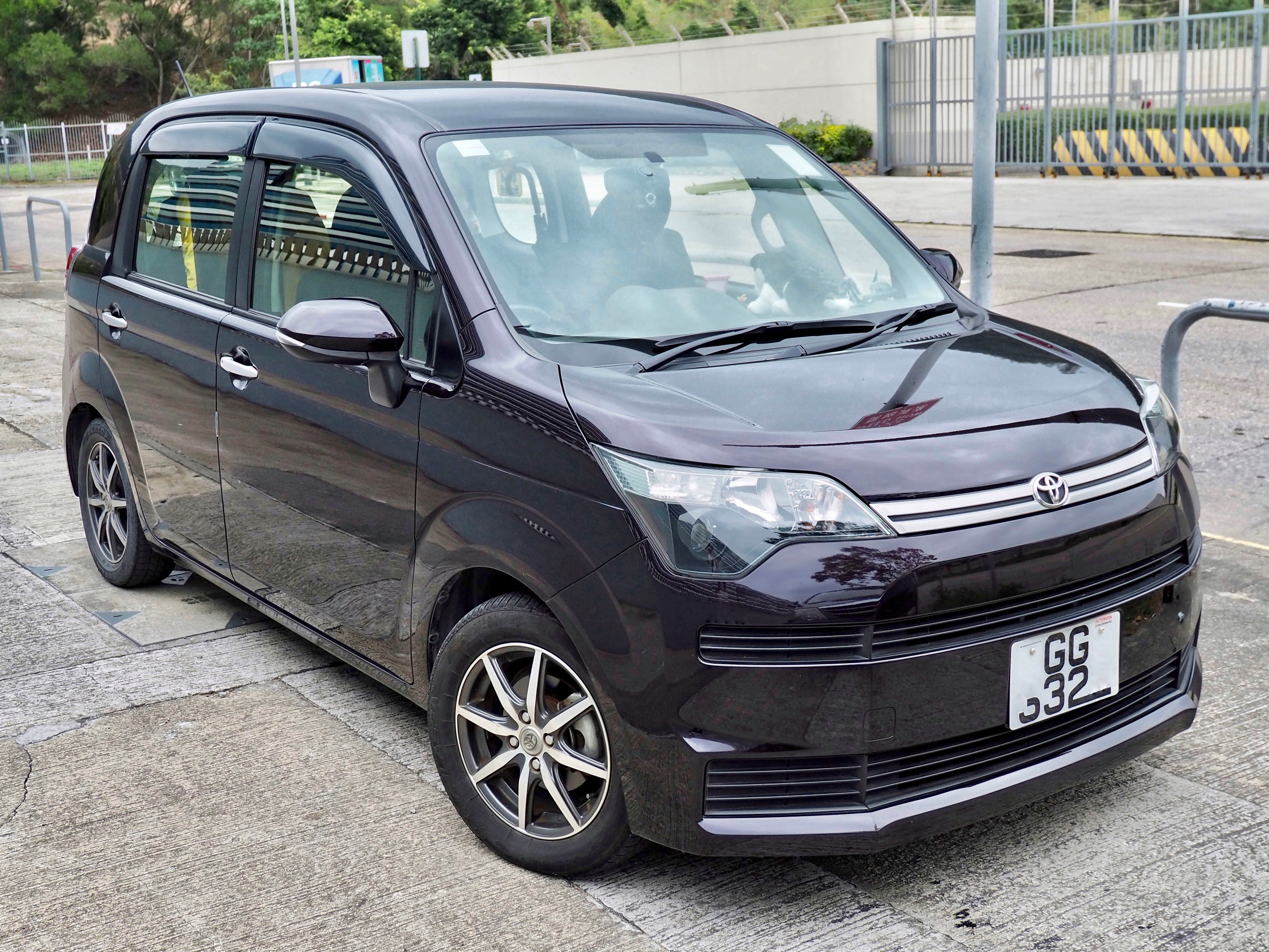
Toyota Spade

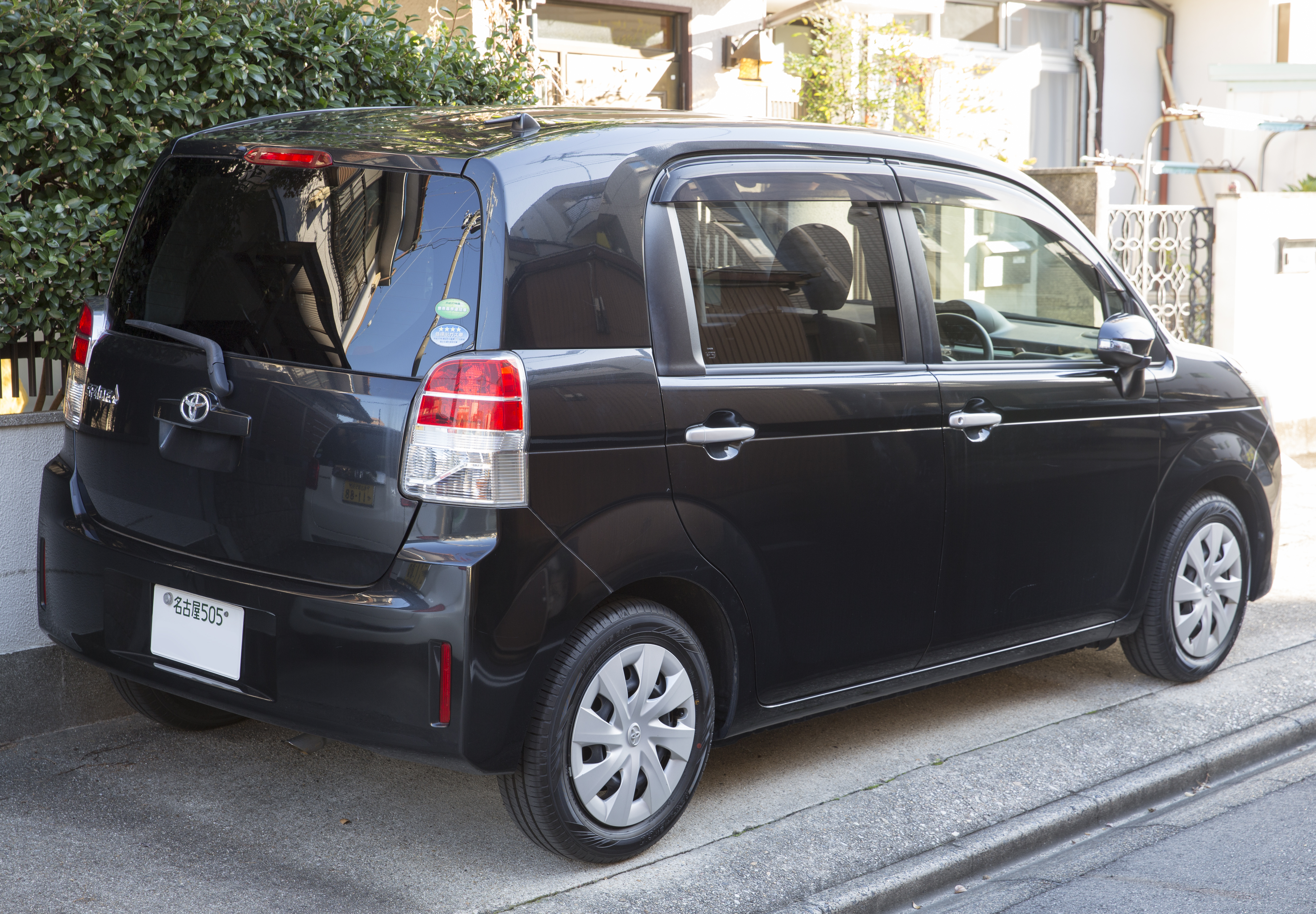
Toyota Spade (rear)

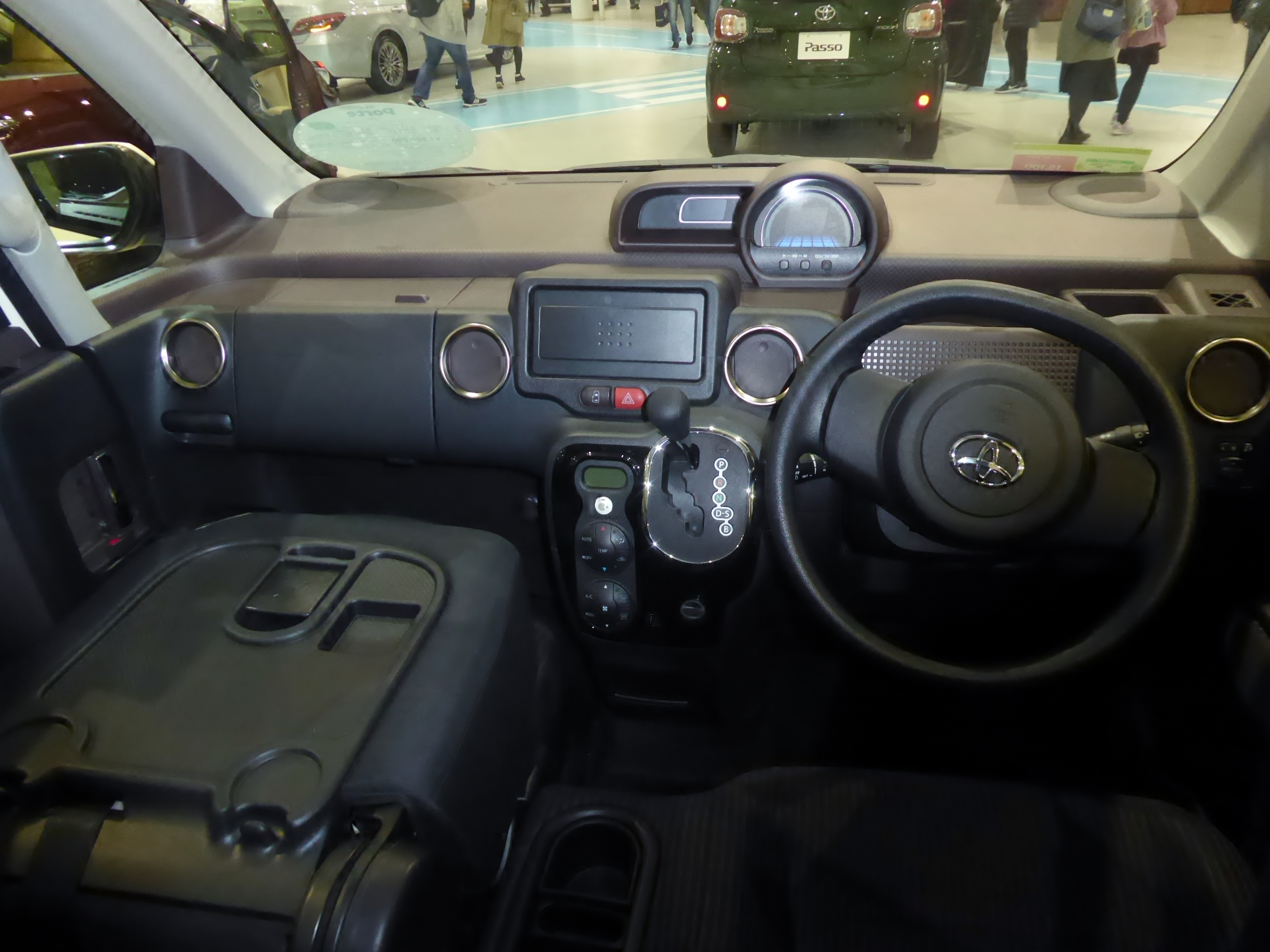
Interior

== Sales ==
Year	Japan	
Year	Porte	Spade
2004	34,867	
2005	45,470	
2006	39,935	
2007	36,777	
2008	32,961	
2009	24,483	
2010	18,582	
2011	12,810	
2012	25,752	26,539
2013	31,649	48,584
2014	26,648	38,733
2015	21,006	28,809
2016	16,687	19,954
2017	8,808	8,215
2018	6,205	4,552
2019	5,037	3,047
2020	3,732	1,886
2021	46	7
