= Toyota NBC platform =

Motor vehicle platform

The Toyota NBC platform is an automobile platform for subcompact cars (B-segment cars) from Toyota. "NBC" stands for "New Basic Car" or "New Basic Compact". The NBC platform made its debut in January 1999 with the first generation Vitz; as such, it is also called the "Vitz platform". It is replaced by the newer B platform.

== Features ==
- NBC cars can be either front-wheel-drive or all-wheel-drive.
- AWD variants use V-Flex II system, which is a viscous-coupling torque-on-demand.
- Engines are mounted transversely.
- Front suspension is MacPherson strut, while rear is torsion beam.
- Brakes are ventilated discs at front and leading-trailing drums at rear. Rear disc brakes were introduced in August 1999 as an option but came standard on models such as the European T-Sport and Japanese Vitz RS.

== Models ==
- First-generation Vitz family:
  - Hatchback: XP10 — Vitz/Yaris/Echo (Japan/Europe/Canada/Australia)
  - Sedan: XP10 — Platz/Echo (Japan/Canada/United States)
  - MPV: XP20 — Fun Cargo/Yaris Verso (Japan/Europe)
- Various vehicles based on the first-generation Vitz:
  - AP10 — Porte
  - XP19 — WiLL Vi
  - XP30 — First-generation bB (Japan) and Scion xB (United States)
  - XP40 — First-generation Vios/Soluna Vios
  - XP50 — Probox/Succeed vans and wagons (use stretched wheelbase)
  - XP60 — First-generation ist (Japan) and Scion xA (United States)
  - XP70 — WiLL Cypha
  - XP80 — First-generation Sienta
  - XZ20 — Second-generation Raum

=== Notes ===
- Second-generation bB and xB are no longer based on NBC platform:
  - Second-generation bB uses smaller Passo/Daihatsu Boon "NC" platform (which is Daihatsu-rooted);
  - Second-generation xB utilizes larger MC platform.
- The third vehicle in the "WiLL" series — WiLL VS — was built on a larger MC platform.
- The full model code is depending on the engine, see List of Toyota model codes for formula.

== EFC platform ==
Introduced in 2010, the EFC platform is derived from the NBC platform and used primarily for models sold in some emerging countries. The platform had been designed to cut down on non-essential parts and made it as low-cost as possible. "EFC" stands for "Emerging markets Frontier Concept" or "Entry Family Car".

Depending on the market, it was either replaced by or used alongside the next generation EFC platform, which was based on the modified B platform. The only vehicles built on this platform is Toyota Etios.

=== Models ===
- AK10 — Etios

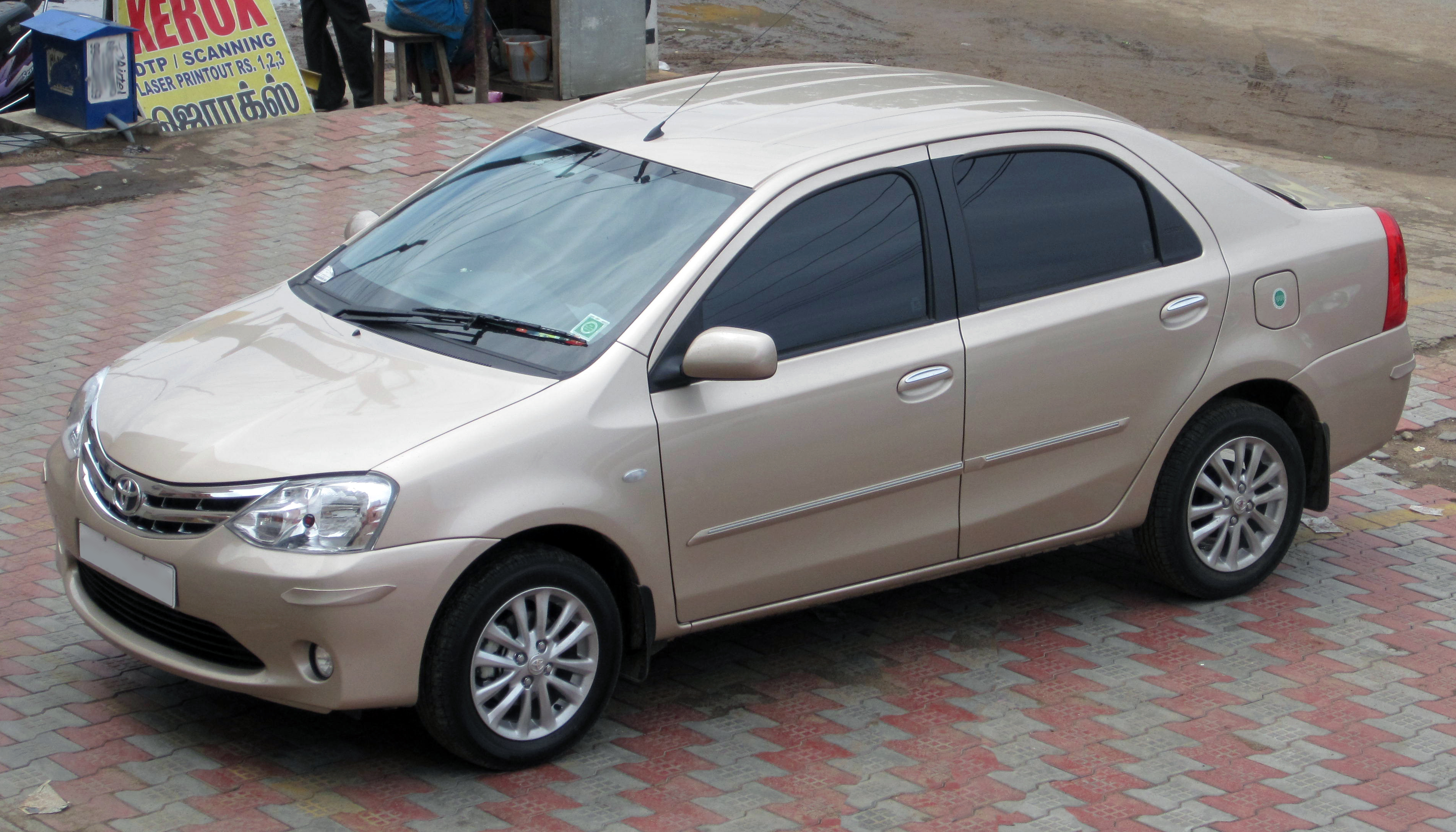
Etios

- AK10 - Etios Liva/Valco

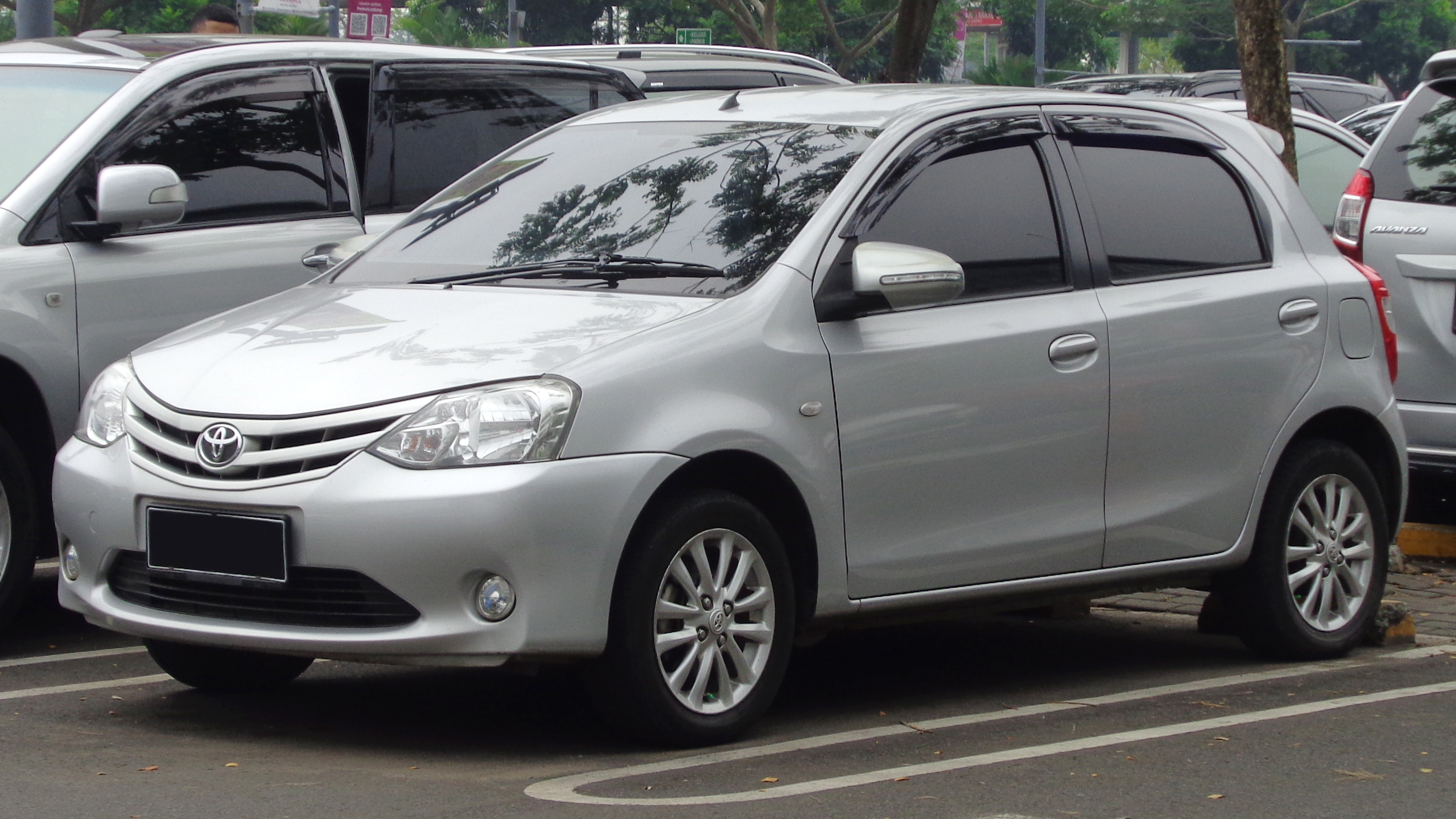
Etios Liva/Valco
