= Saipa Shahin =

Iranian compact sedan

Overview
- Manufacturer: SAIPA
- Model code: SP100
- Also called: Saipa Roham
- Production: 2020–present
- Assembly: Iran
- Designer: Hossein Soleimani (exterior)

Body and chassis
- Class: Compact car (C-segment)
- Body style: 4-door sedan
- Layout: Front-engine, front-wheel-drive layout
- Platform: SAIPA SP1 platform (upgraded Toyota B platform)
- Related: Saipa Aria (crossover version)

Powertrain
- Engine: 1.5 L M15TC turbo I4 (Petrol); ME16 l4 (Petrol)
- Power output: 110 hp (82 kW; 112 PS); 178 N⋅m (131 lb⋅ft) of torque
- Transmission: 5-Speed Manual; 6-Speed Automatic

Dimensions
- Wheelbase: 2,650 mm (104.3 in)
- Length: 4,460 mm (175.6 in)
- Width: 1,768 mm (69.6 in)
- Height: 1,501 mm (59.1 in)
- Curb weight: 1,260–1,330 kg (2,778–2,932 lb)

Chronology
- Predecessor: Saipa Saina

The Saipa Shahin (Persian: سایپا شاهین; code name: SP100) is a compact sedan (C-segment) produced by the Iranian manufacturer SAIPA. It was unveiled in 2018 under the name Roham before being renamed Shahin in 2020. Mass production began in December 2020.

== Platform ==
Shahin is built on the SAIPA SP1 platform which is the first Iranian platform that the initial design to the final construction have been done in Iran. According to SAIPA, the platform has been developed from the Toyota B platform used on the Toyota Yaris XP90 and has been upgraded to the latest technologies.

== Engines ==
This car uses a M15TC 1.5-litre turbocharged engine with a power output of 110 hp and 178 N⋅m of torque. It is compliant with Euro5 emission norm. The car is available with a 5-speed manual transmission and with a cvt automatic transmission. The maximum speed is 190 km/h (118 mph) with the manual transmission and 180 km/h (112 mph) with the automatic one. Deliveries of the automatic version have not started yet.

Engine	Type	Displacement	Power	Torque
M15TC	I4 Turbo	1503 cc	110 hp (82 kW; 112 PS)	178 N⋅m (131 lb⋅ft)

== Equipment ==
This car is equipped with automatic air conditioning, keyless entry with push button start, 7-inch multimedia system, tire pressure monitoring system, rear backup camera, parking sensors and heated side mirrors.

Safety features include 2 airbags and ABS (with brake assist and electronic brakeforce distribution).

== Aria ==
The Saipa Aria (Persian: سایپا آریا; code name: SP100 Crossover) is a compact crossover SUV (C-segment) unveiled in 2020 by Iranian manufacturer SAIPA. It is the first crossover produced by Saipa in Iran. It is derived from the Saipa Shahin sedan.

== Shahin Plus ==
Shahin Plus with ME16 engine, new interior and additional equipments was announced in 2023. The ME16 engine is a new Iranian engine developed by Saipa from PSA EC5.

ybSaipa Engine	Type	Displacement	Power	Torque
M16	I4	1600 cc	115 hp (86 kW; 117 PS)	147 N⋅m (108 lb⋅ft)

== Gallery ==
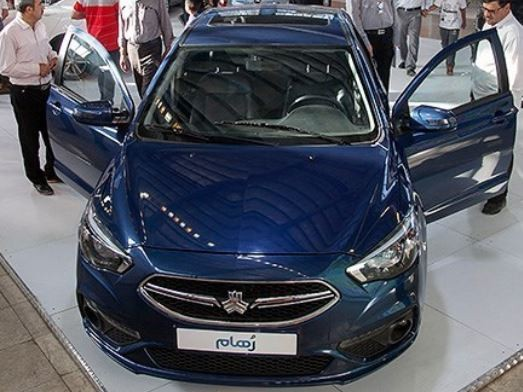
Saipa Shahin front

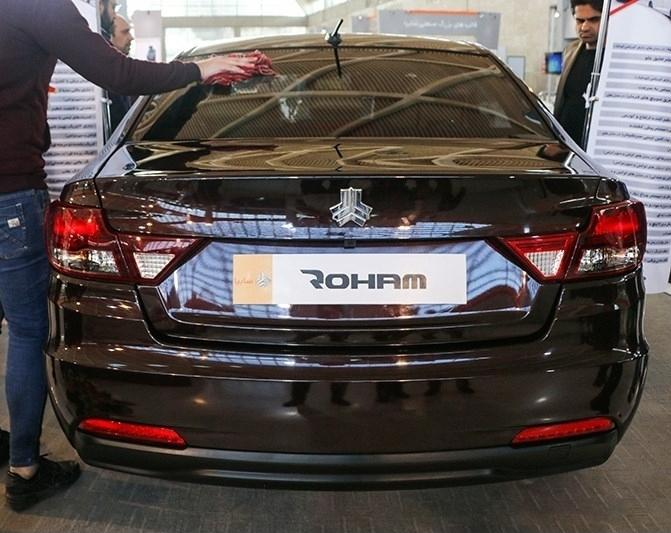
Saipa Shahin rear

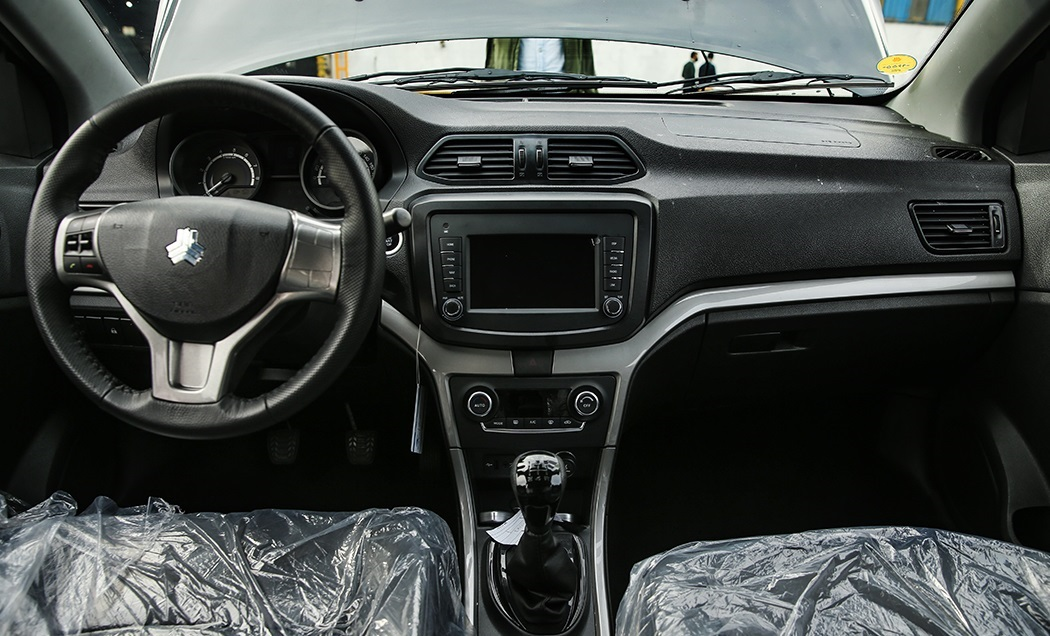
Saipa Shahin interior
