= Toyota B platform =

Type of automobile platform produced by Toyota

The Toyota B platform is a front-wheel drive automobile platform (also adaptable to four-wheel drive) that has underpinned various Toyota models from the subcompact and compact categories. The B platform improves on and replaces the NBC platform and sits below the MC platforms. Automobiles based on the B chassis started production in the beginning of 2005 with the XP90 series Vitz/Yaris hatchback.

The B platform was replaced by TNGA-B platform.

== Applications ==
- Toyota Vitz/Yaris hatchback — XP90 (2005–2010), XP130 (2010–2020)
- Toyota Belta/Vios/Yaris sedan — XP90 (2005–2013)
- Toyota ist/Urban Cruiser/Scion xD — XP110 (2007–2016)
- Toyota Porte/Spade — XP140 (2012–2020)
- Toyota Ractis/Verso-S/Subaru Trezia — XP100 (2005–2010), XP120 (2010–2016)
- Toyota Sienta — XP170 (2015–2022) (Note: Front part only, the rear part is using the New MC platform.)
- Toyota Probox/Mazda Familia Van — XP160 (2014–present) (Note: Front part only, the rear part retained the older NBC platform.)
- Toyota Succeed — XP160 (2014–2020)
- Toyota Prius c/Aqua — NHP10 (2011–2021)
- Toyota Corolla Axio/Fielder — E160 (2012–2025)
- Toyota JPN Taxi/Comfort Hybrid — NTP10 (2017–present)
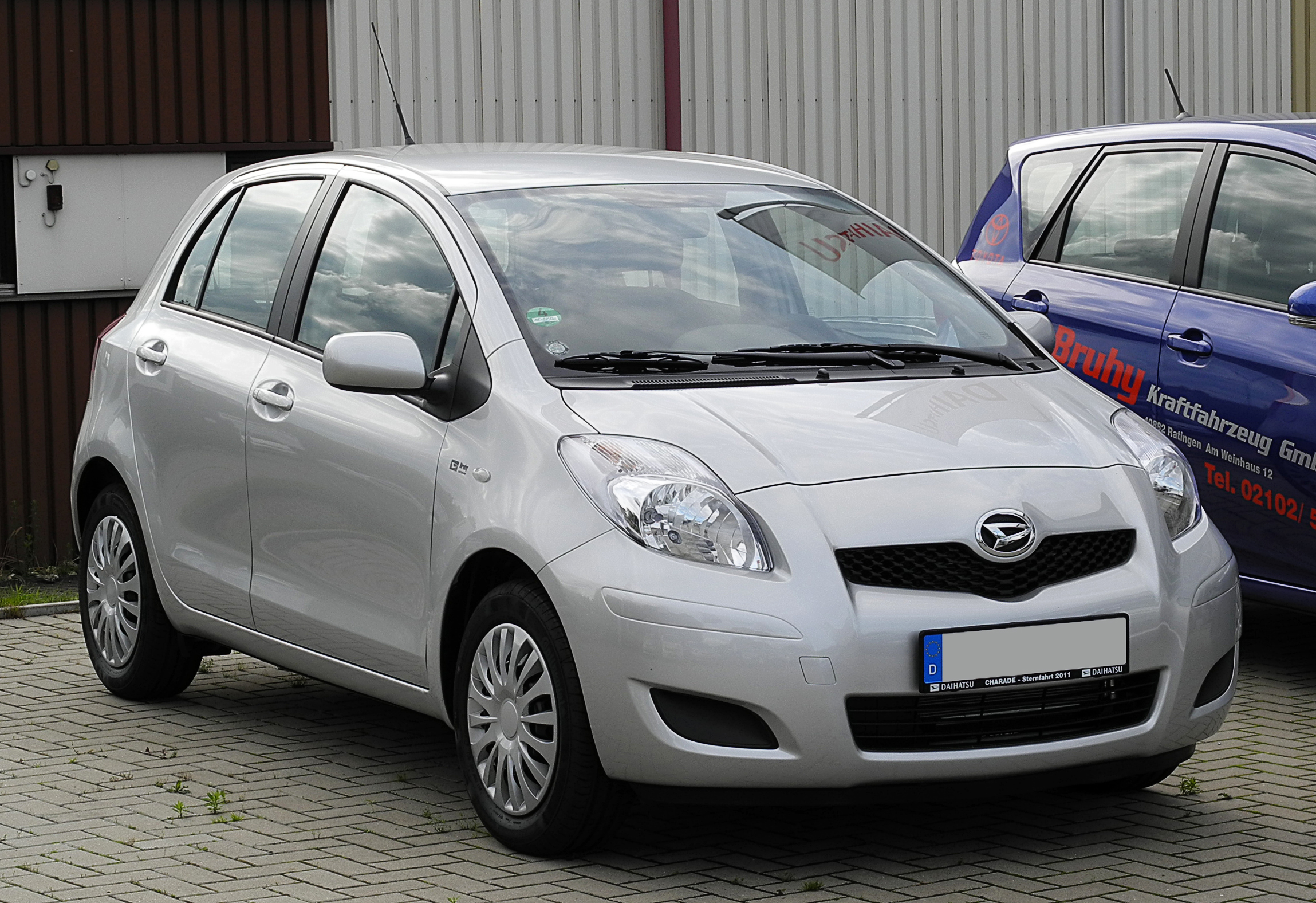
Daihatsu Charade

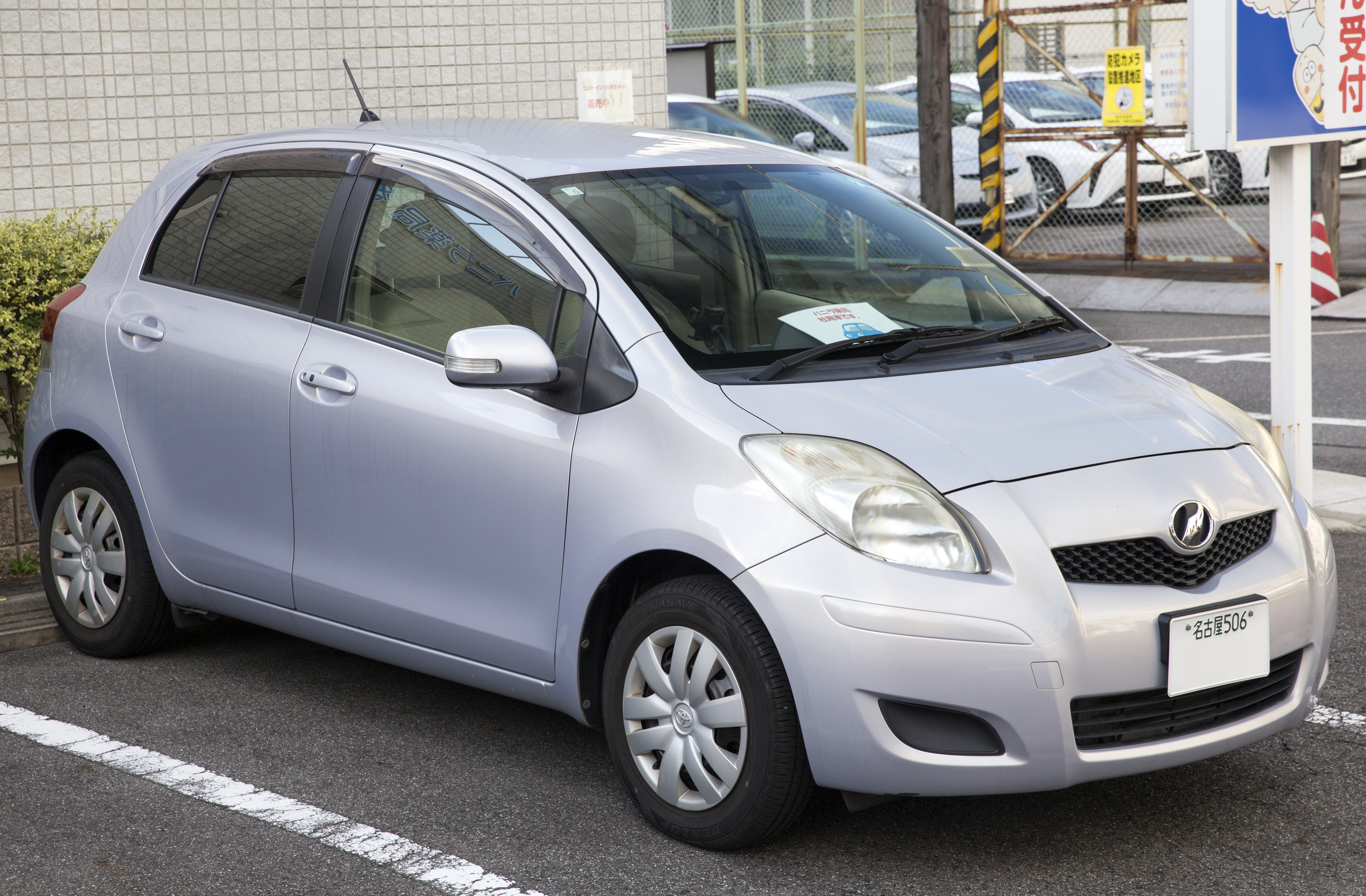
Toyota Vitz/Yaris hatchback (XP90)

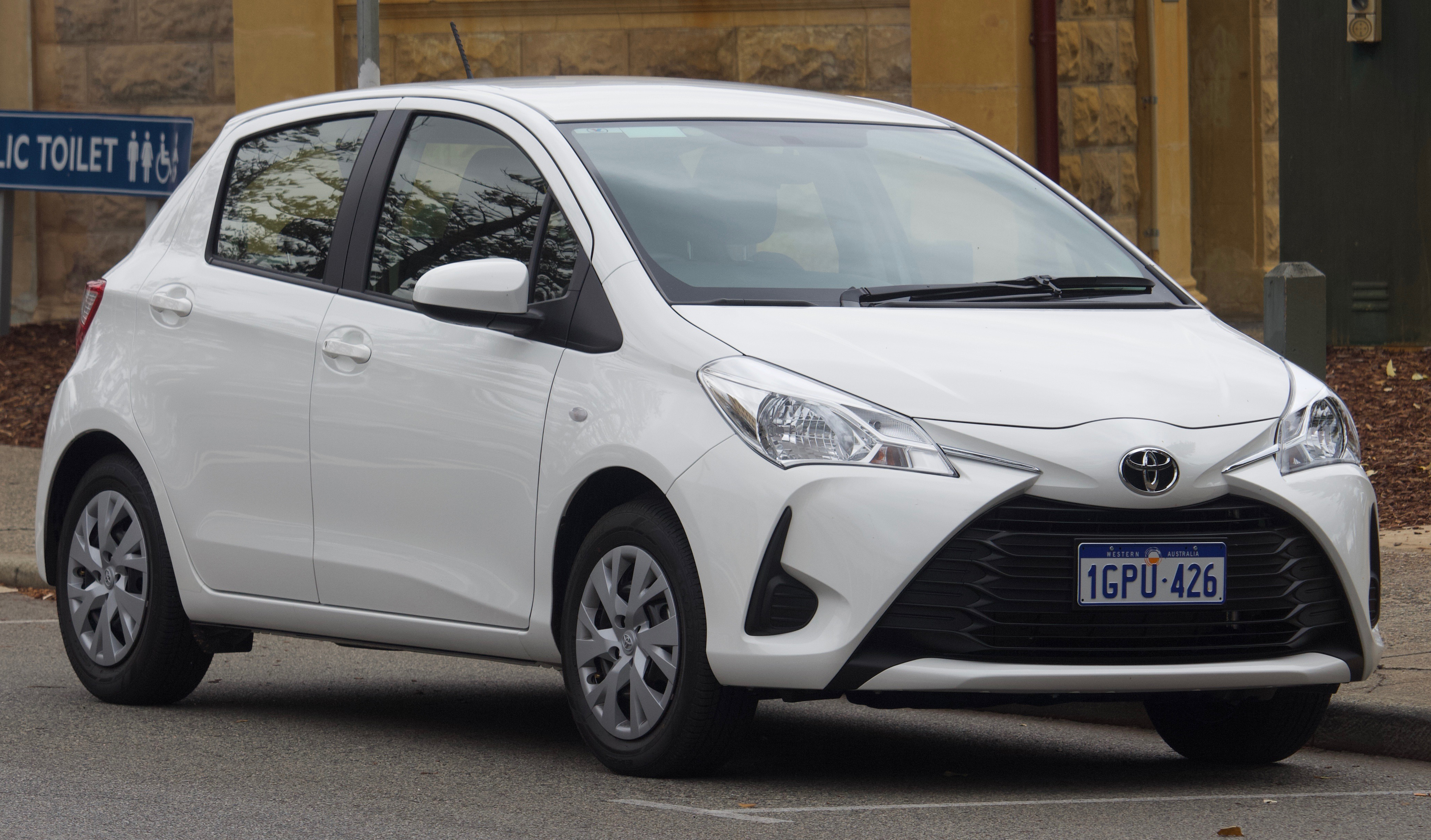
Toyota Vitz/Yaris hatchback (XP130)

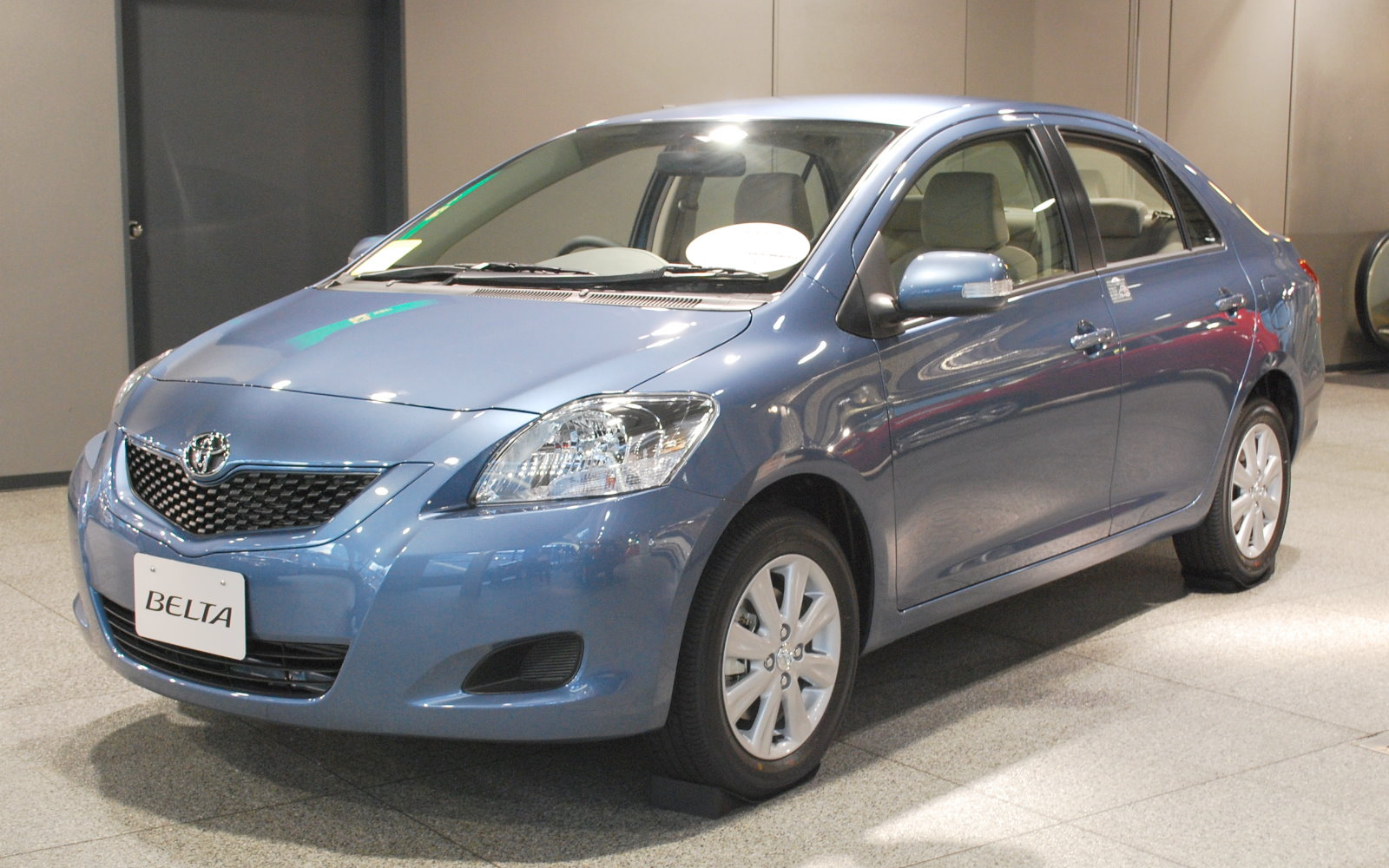
Toyota Belta/Vios/Yaris sedan (XP90)

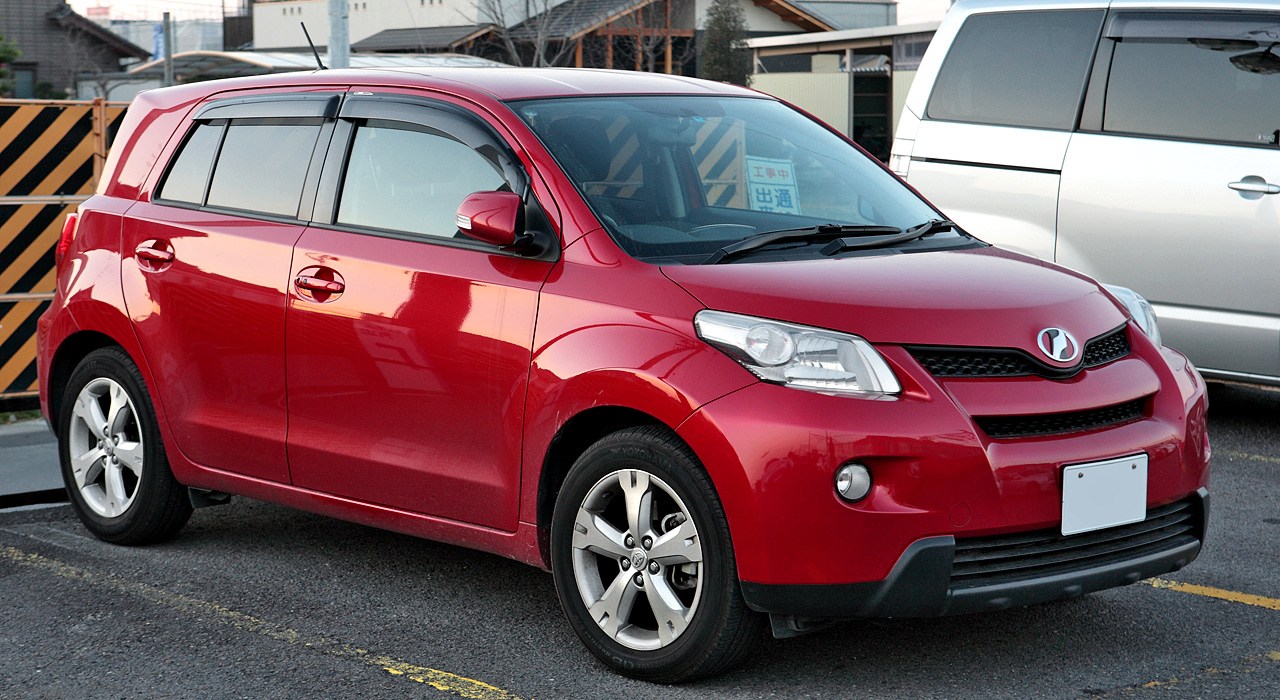
Toyota ist/Urban Cruiser (XP110)

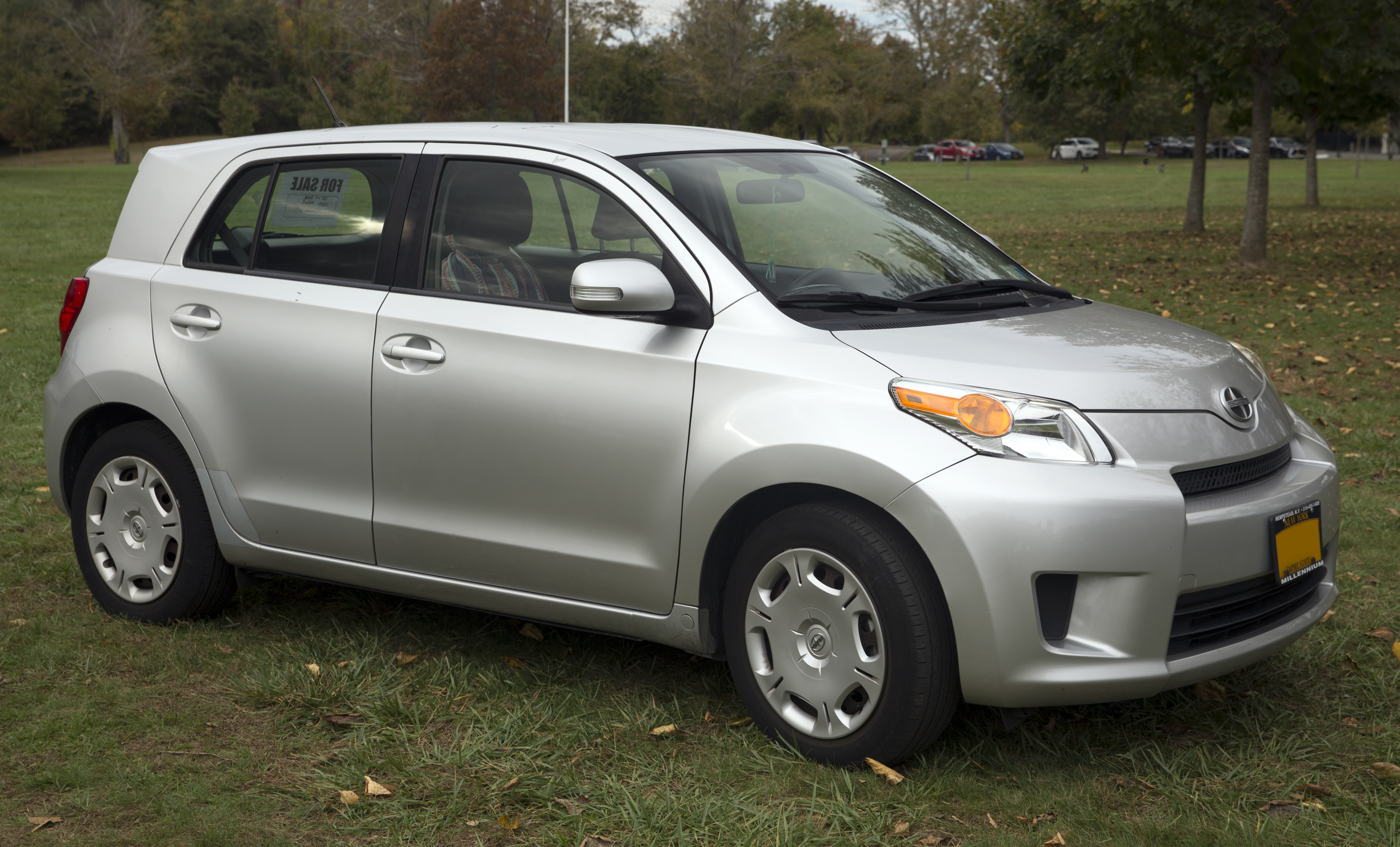
Scion xD (XP110)

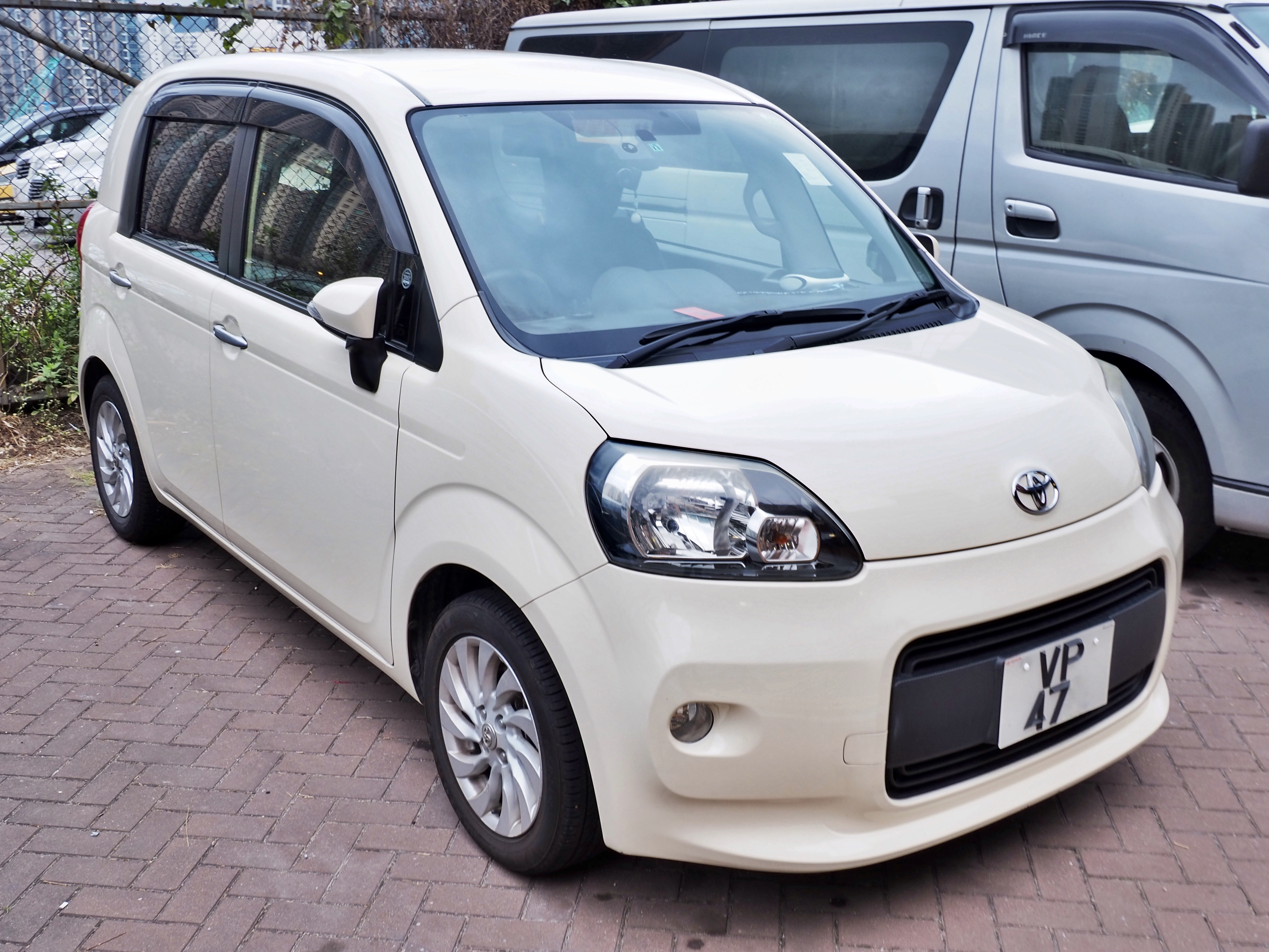
Toyota Porte (XP140)

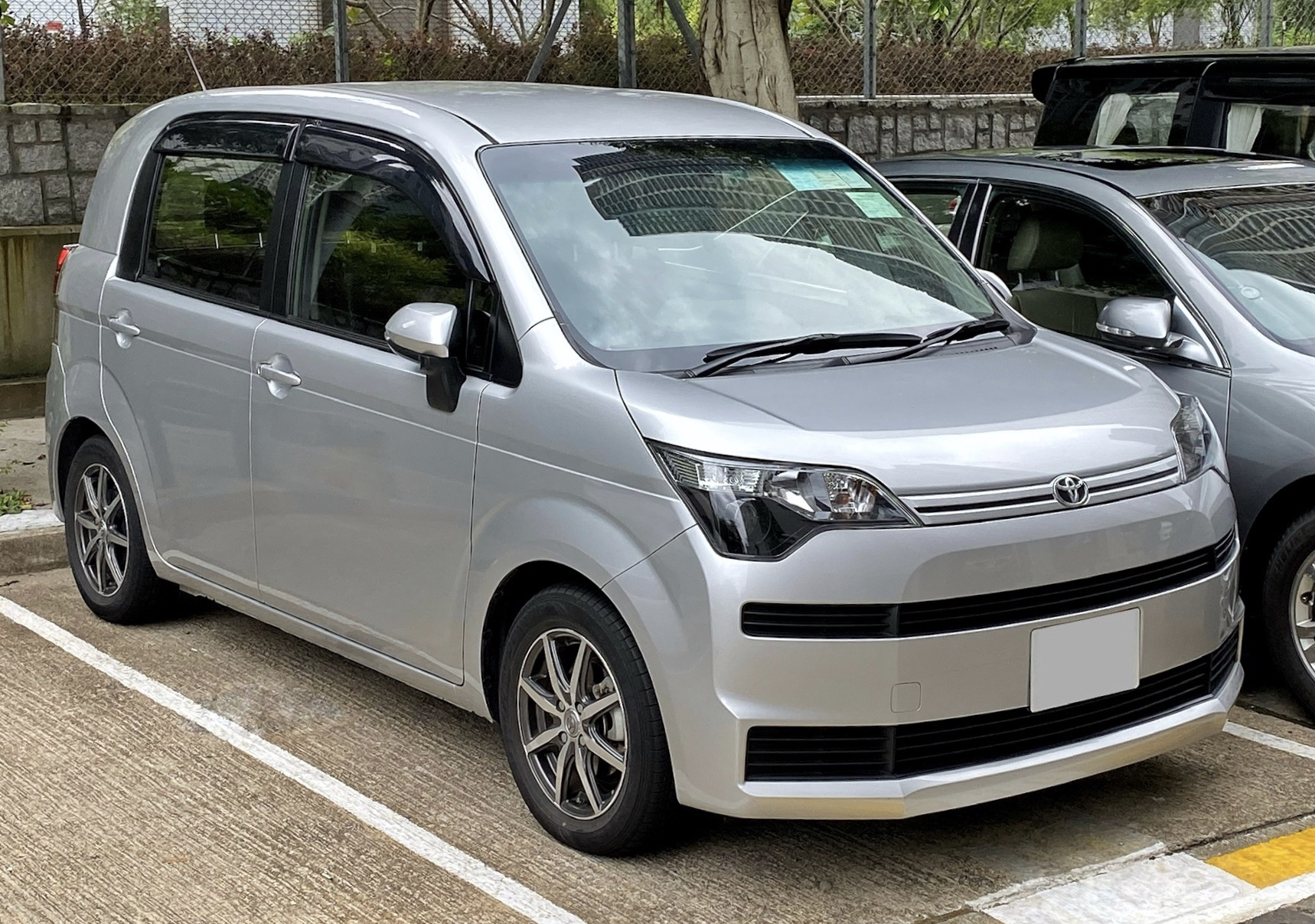
Toyota Spade (XP140)

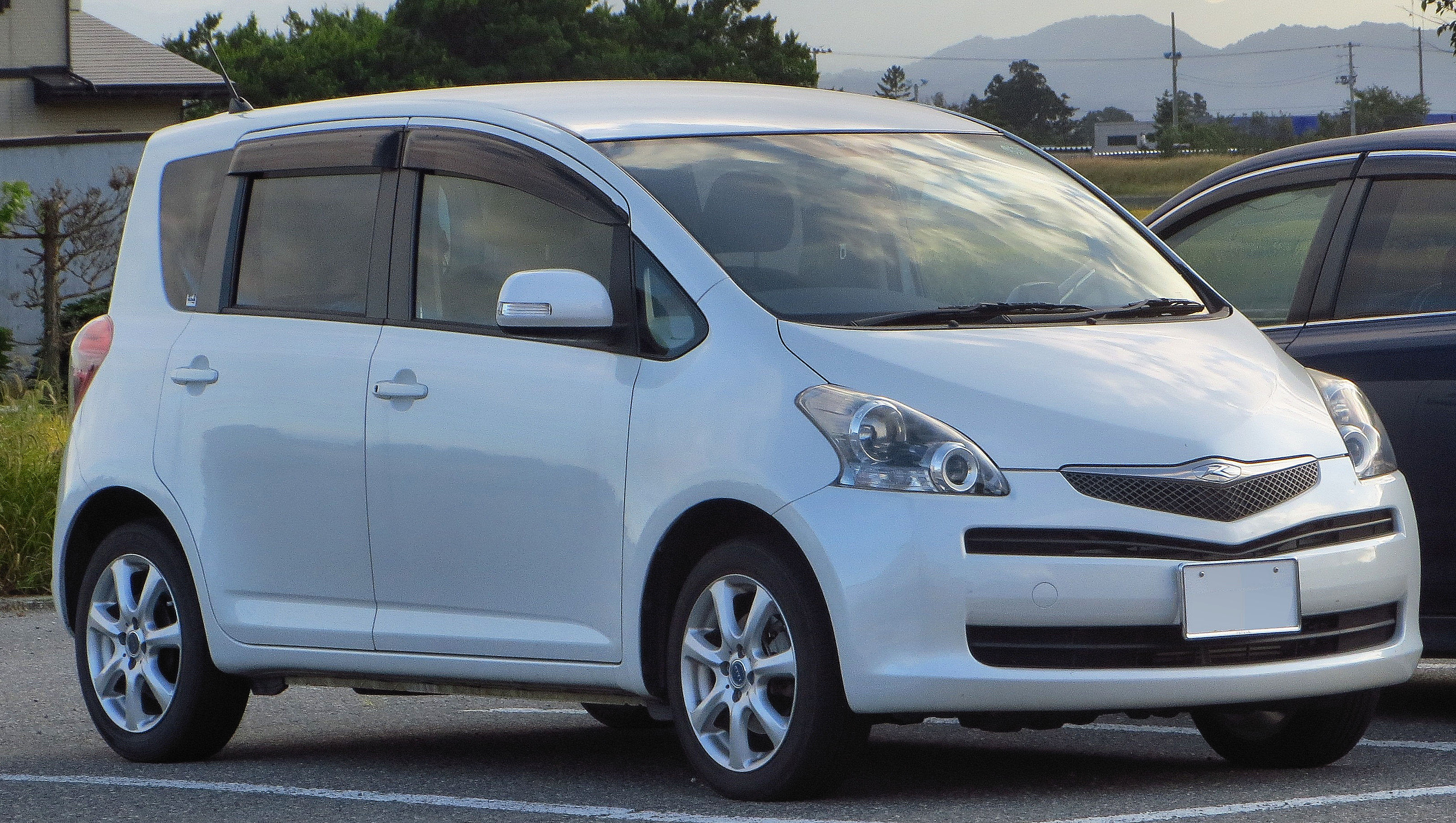
Toyota Ractis/Verso-S (XP100)

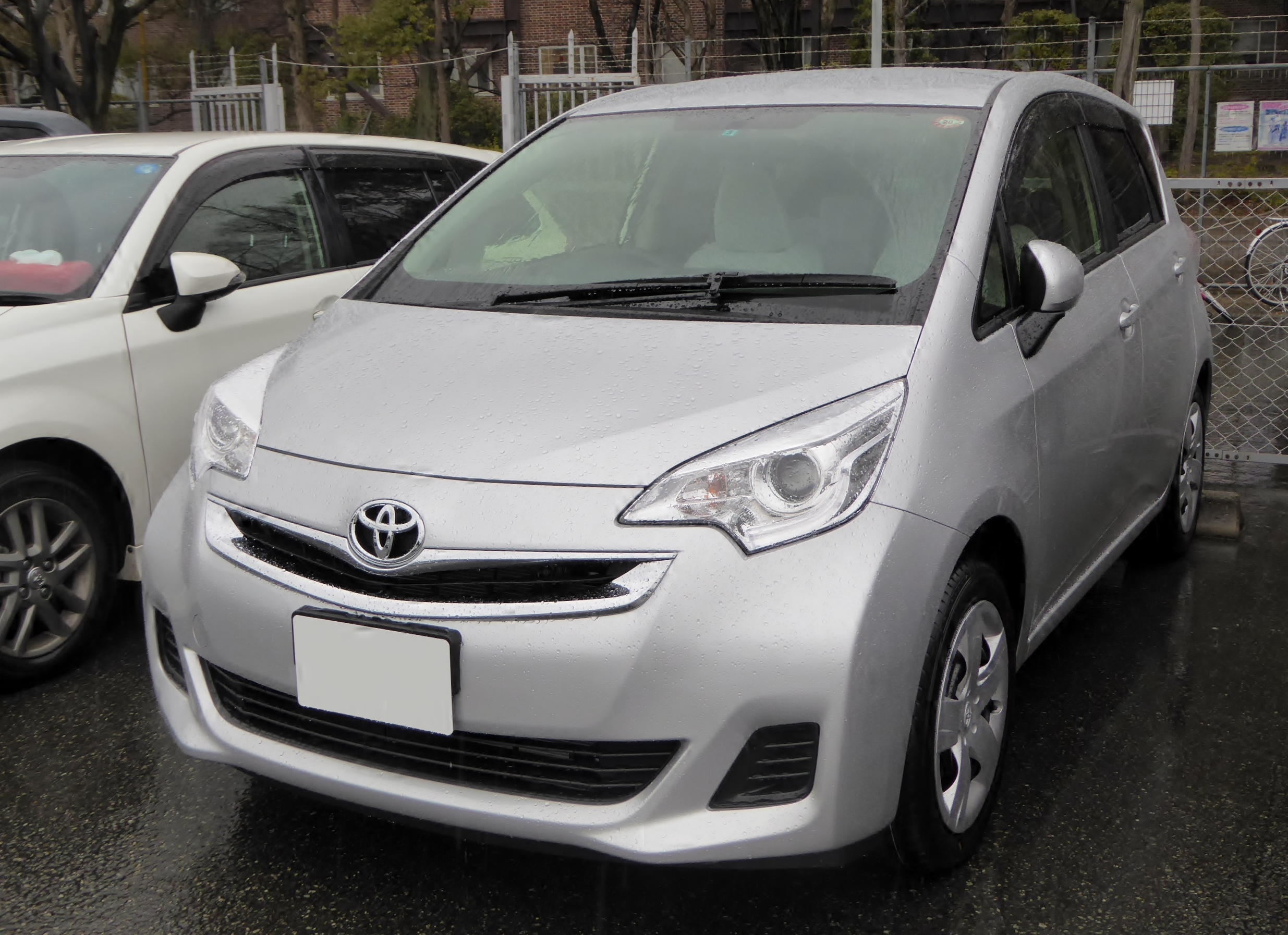
Toyota Ractis/Verso-S (XP120)

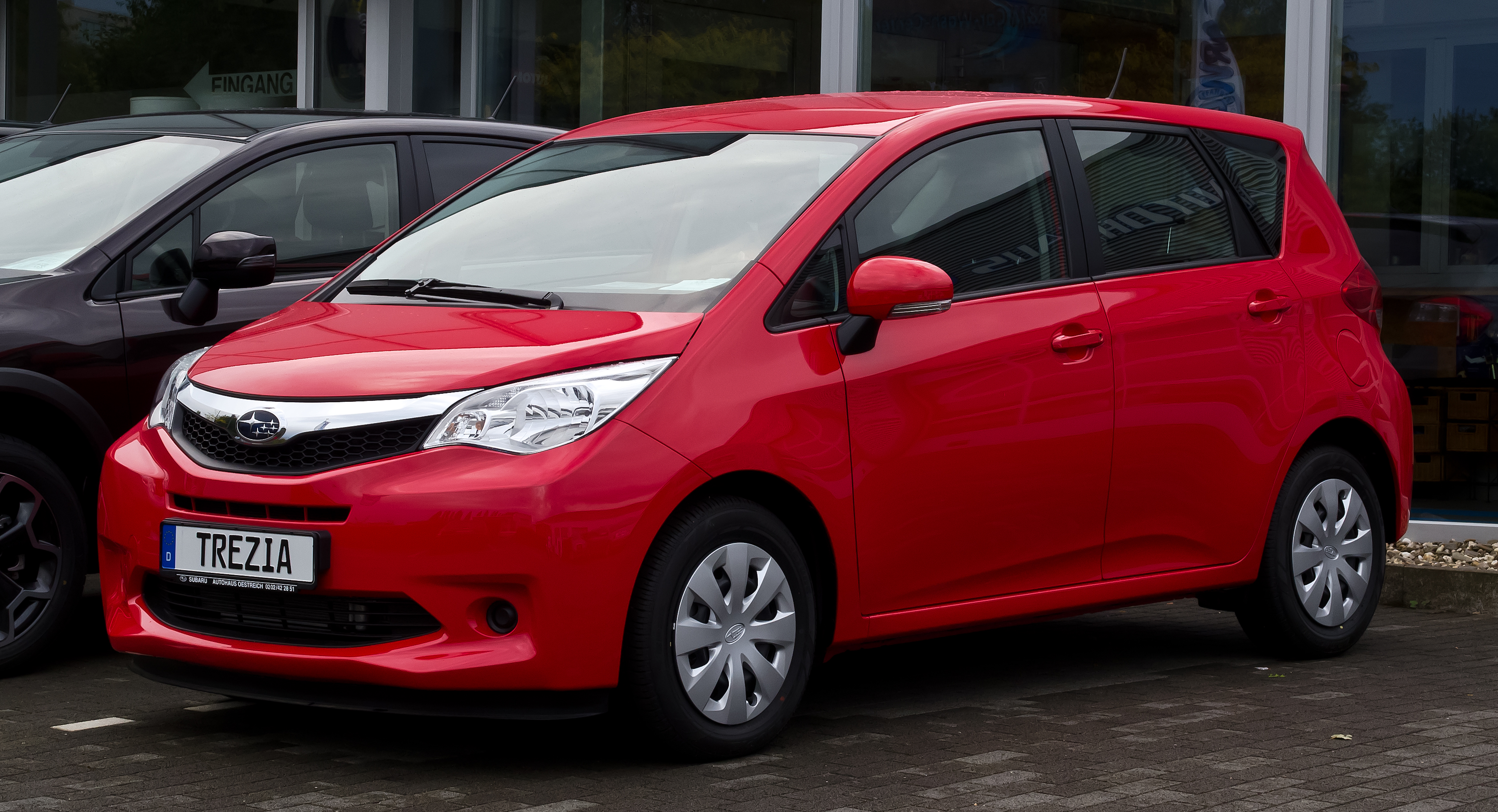
Subaru Trezia

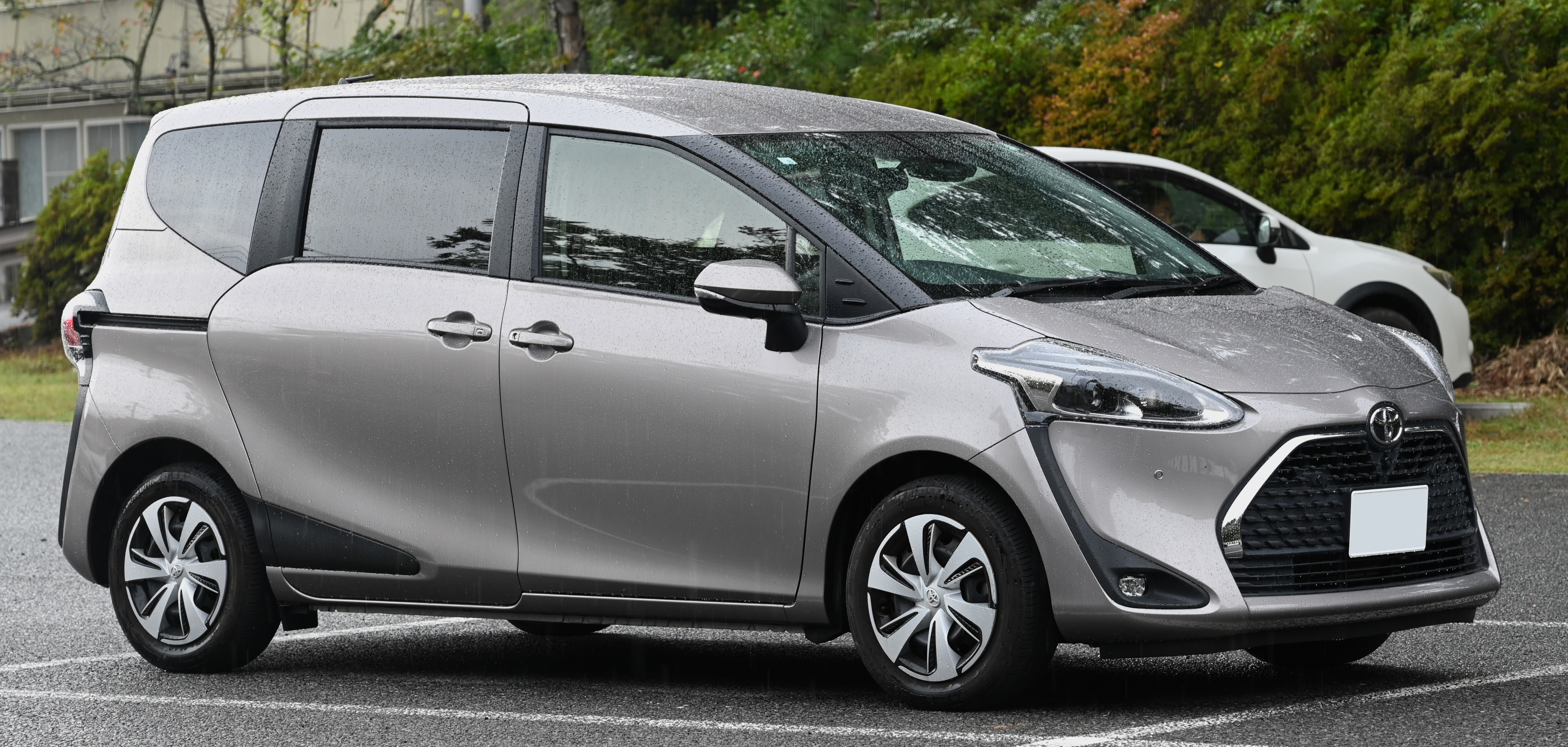
Toyota Sienta (XP170)

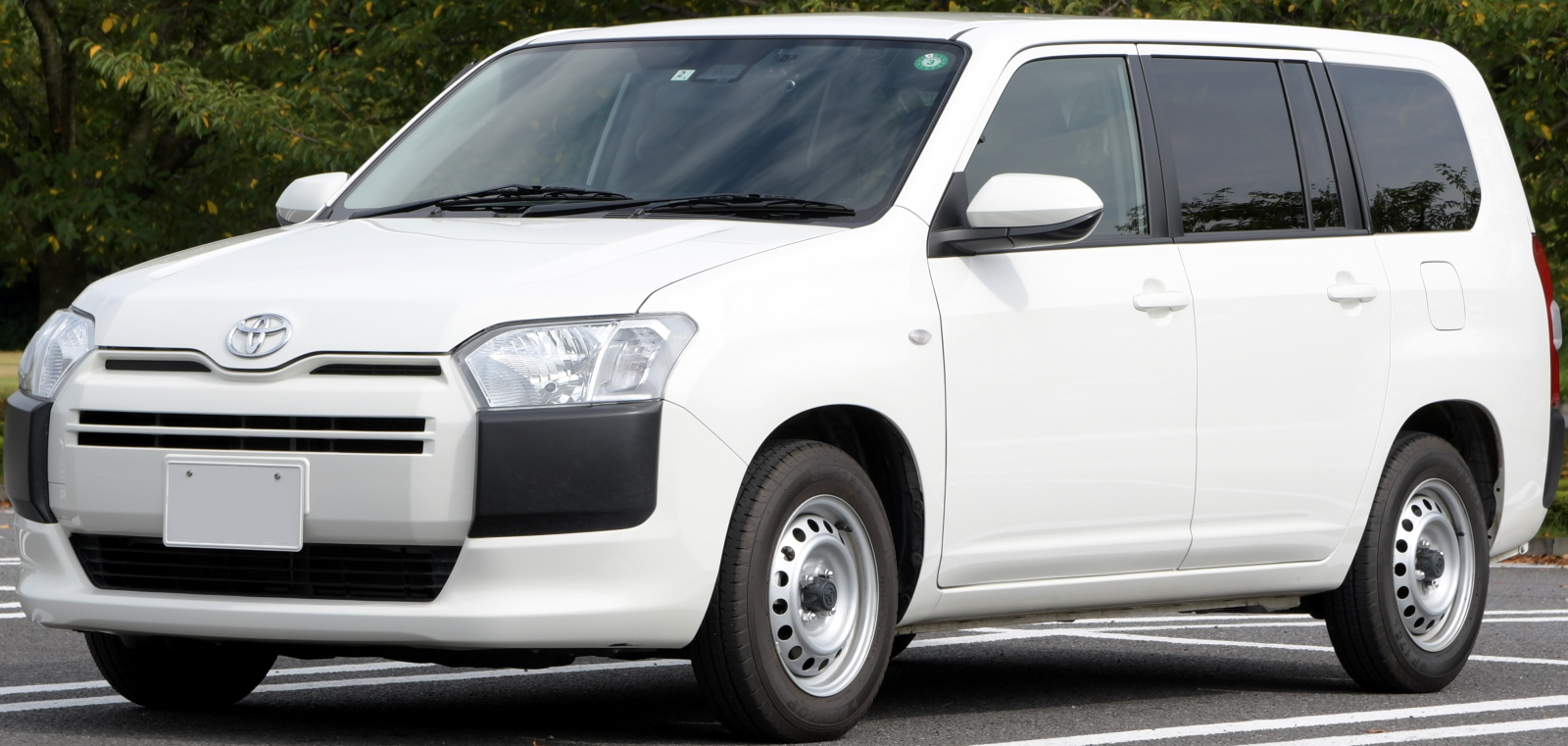
Toyota Probox/Succeed (XP160)

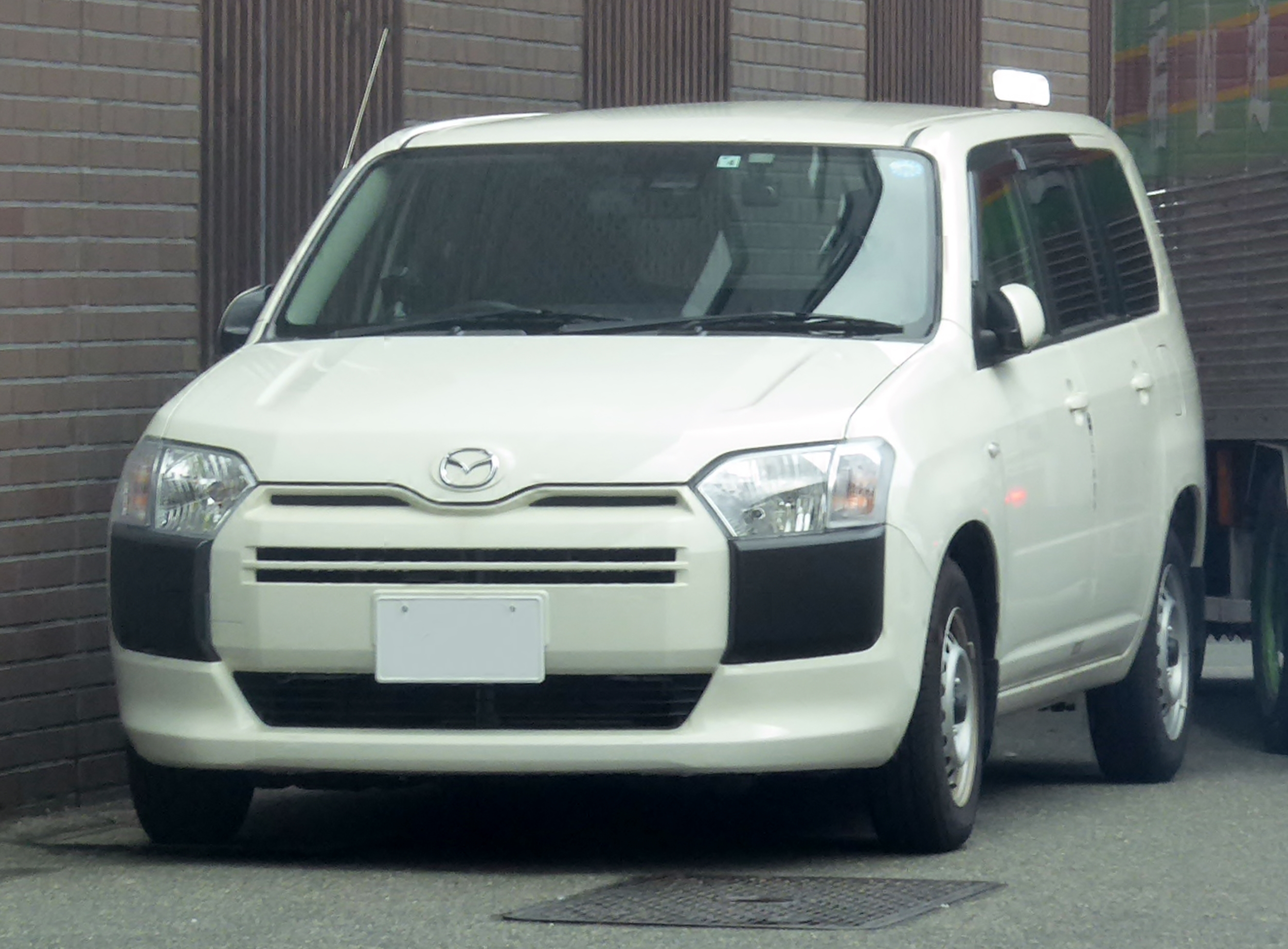
Mazda Familia Van (XP160)

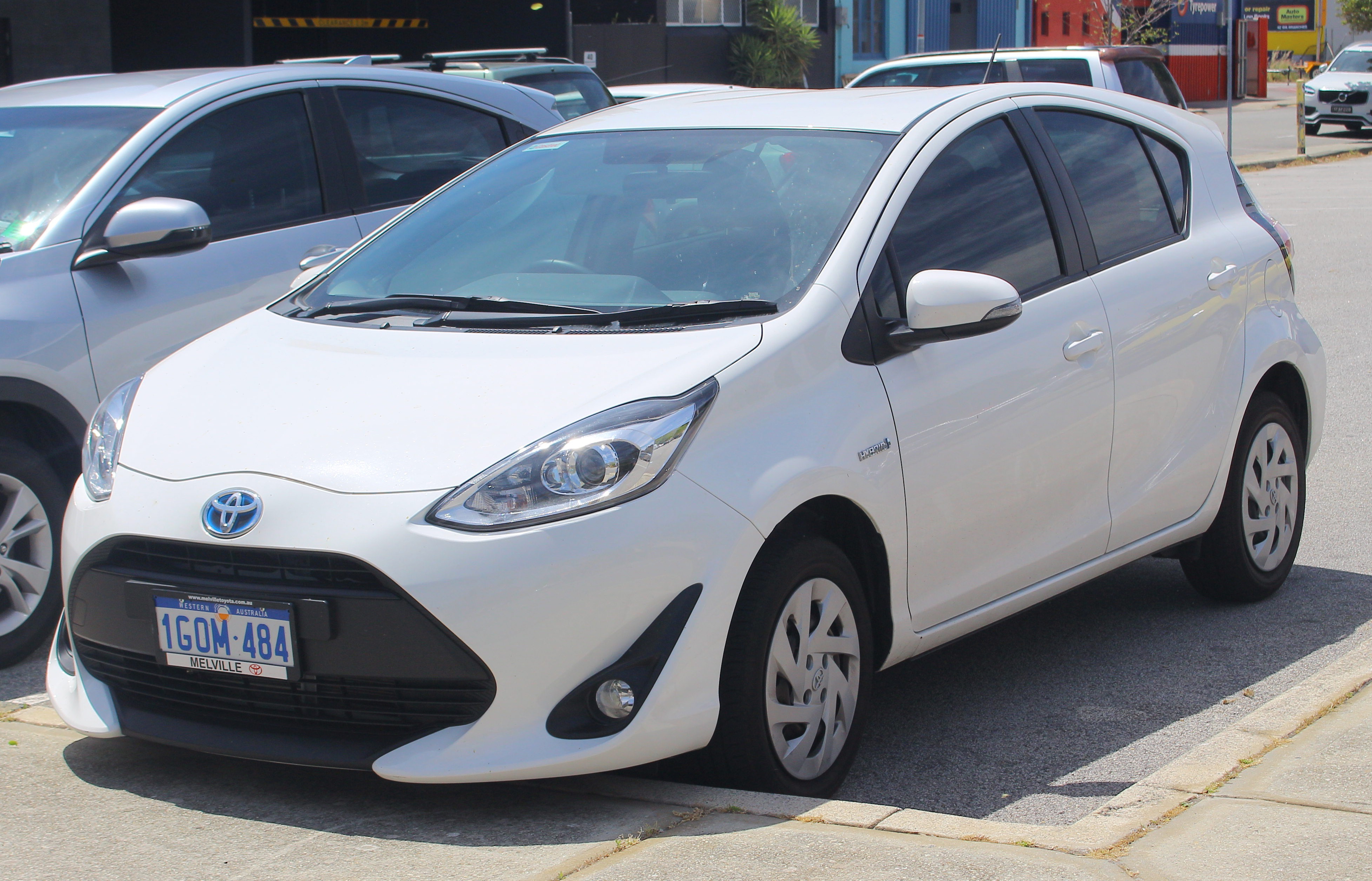
Toyota Prius c/Aqua (NHP10)

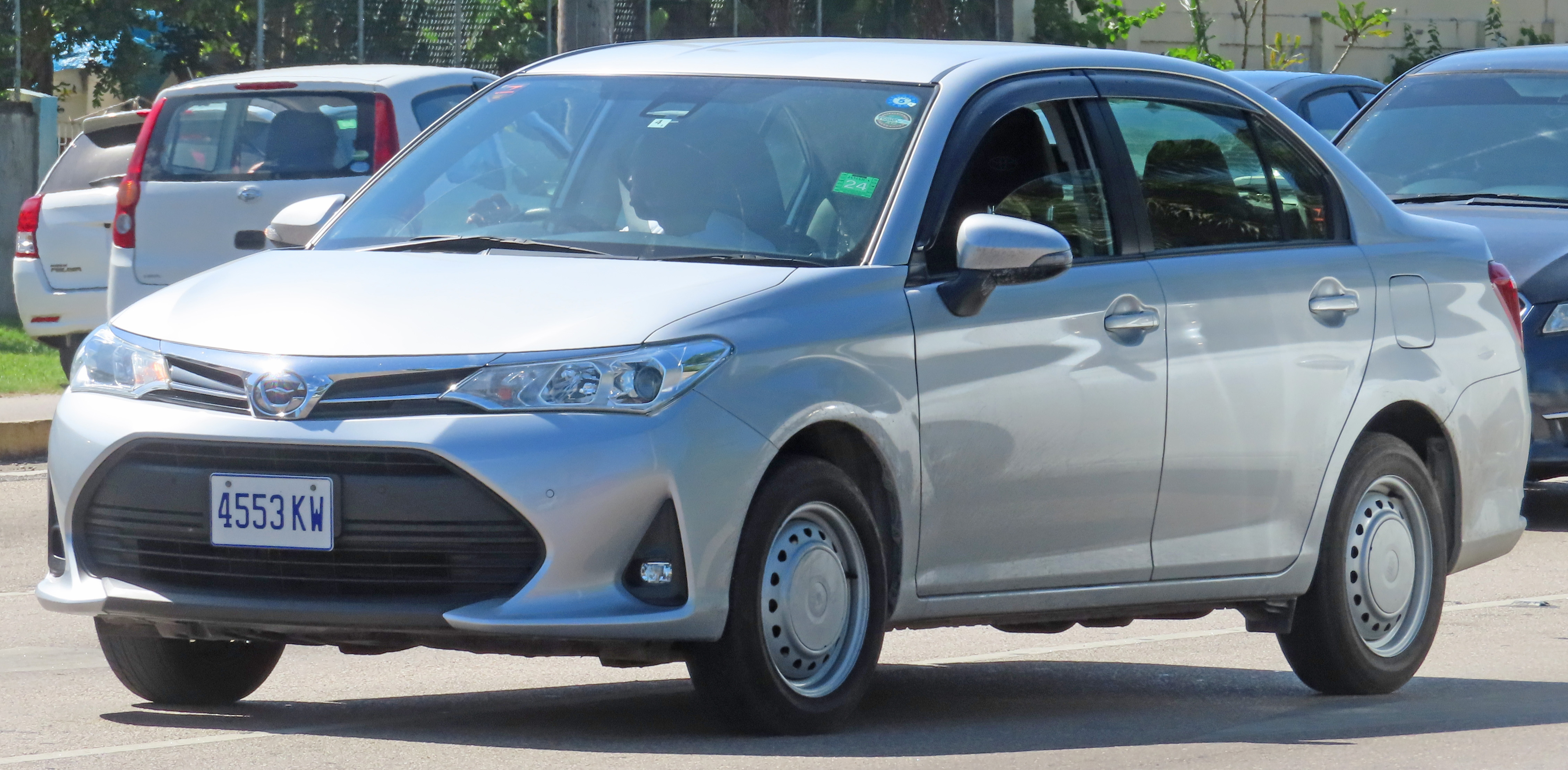
Toyota Corolla Axio (E160)

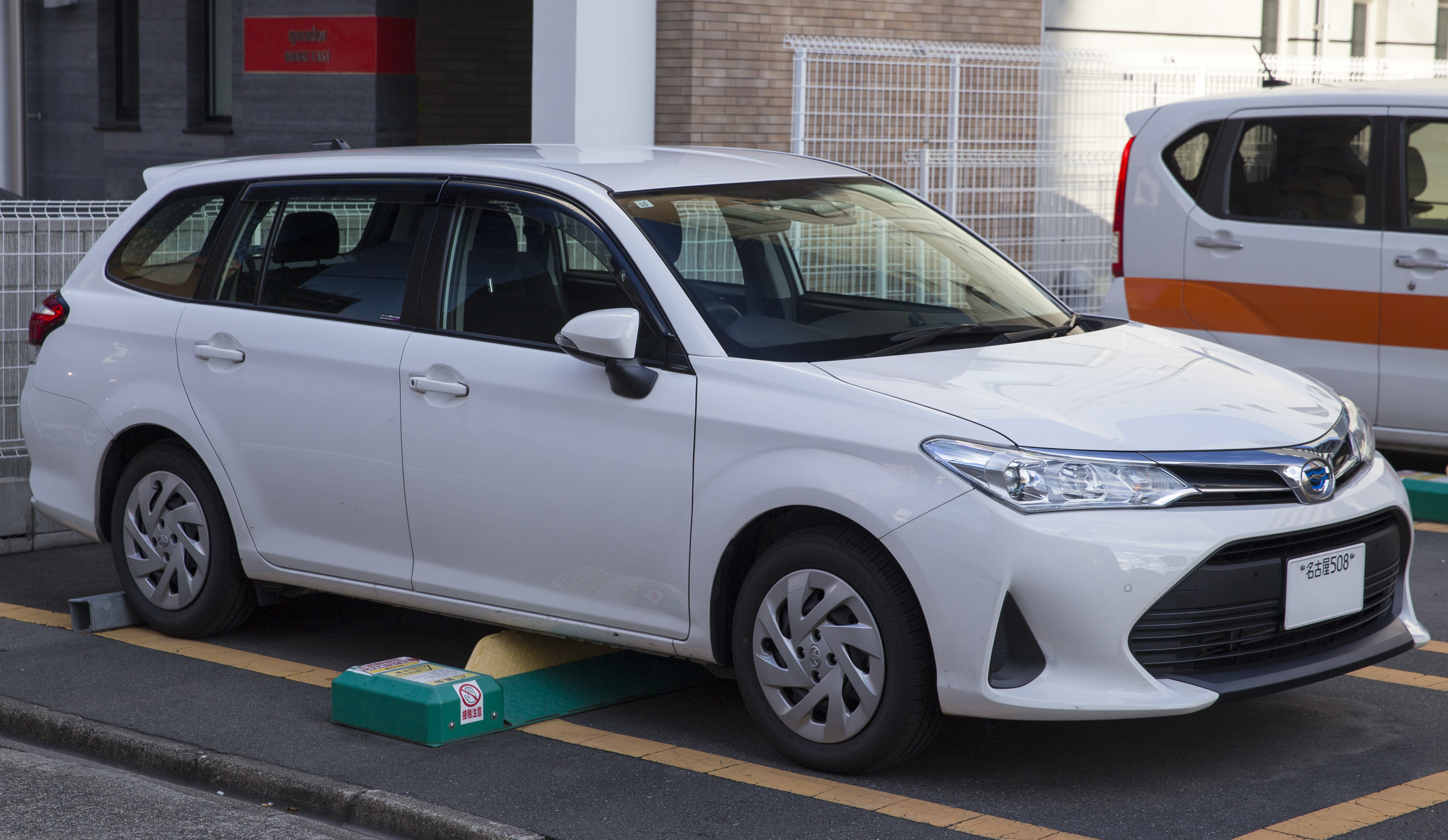
Toyota Corolla Fielder (E160)

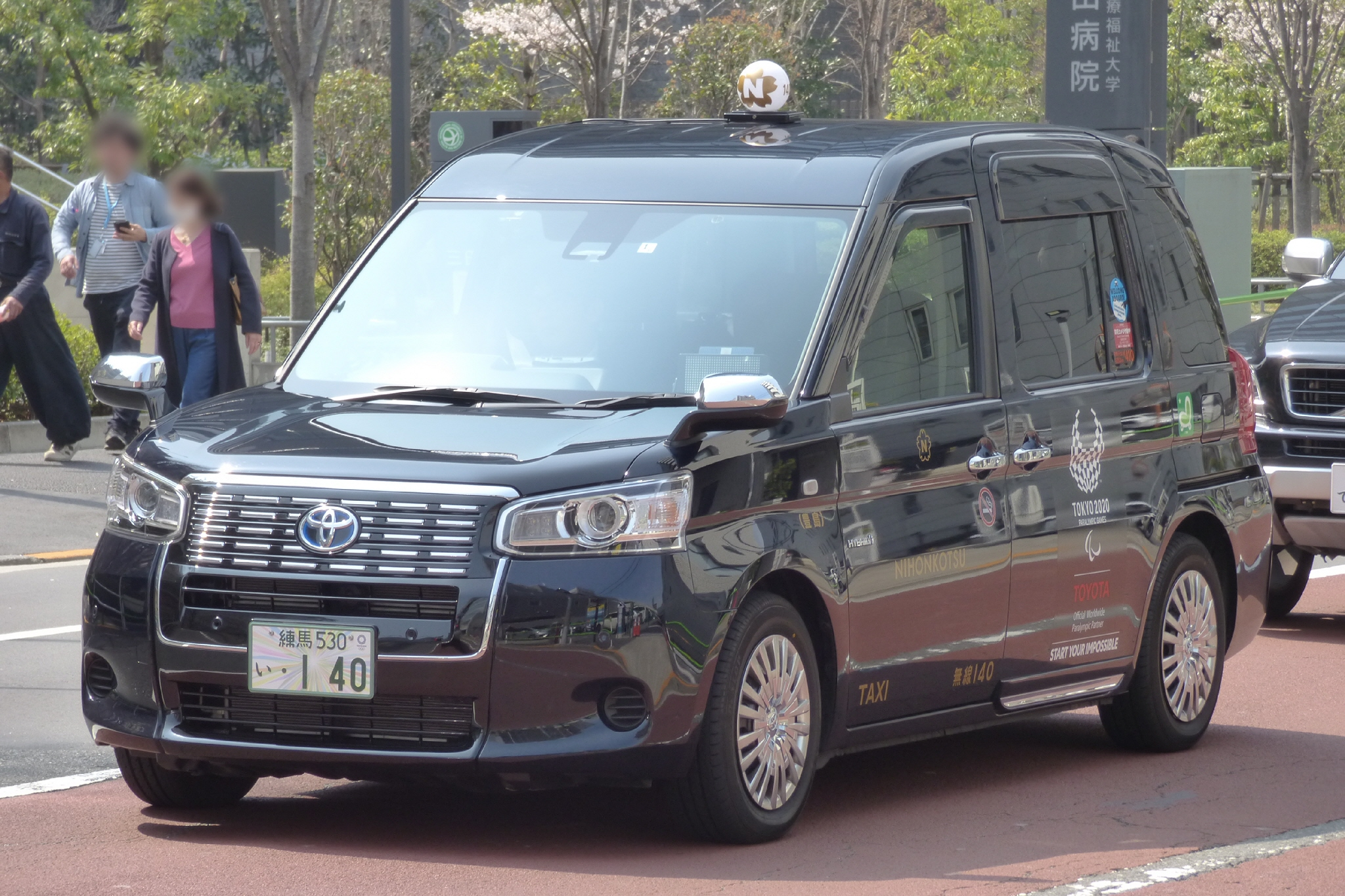
Toyota JPN Taxi/Comfort Hybrid (NTP10)

== New EFC platform ==
Introduced in 2013, the new EFC platform was based on a reengineered version of the B platform. Like its predecessor, this version was developed specifically for subcompact sedans and hatchbacks in emerging markets. The only vehicles built on this platform were the XP150 series Yaris, which shared numerous components with the B-platform-derived XP90 series.

Starting in 2022, this platform was gradually replaced by a Daihatsu-developed DNGA-B platform.

=== Applications ===
- Toyota Yaris/Vios – XP150 (2013–present)
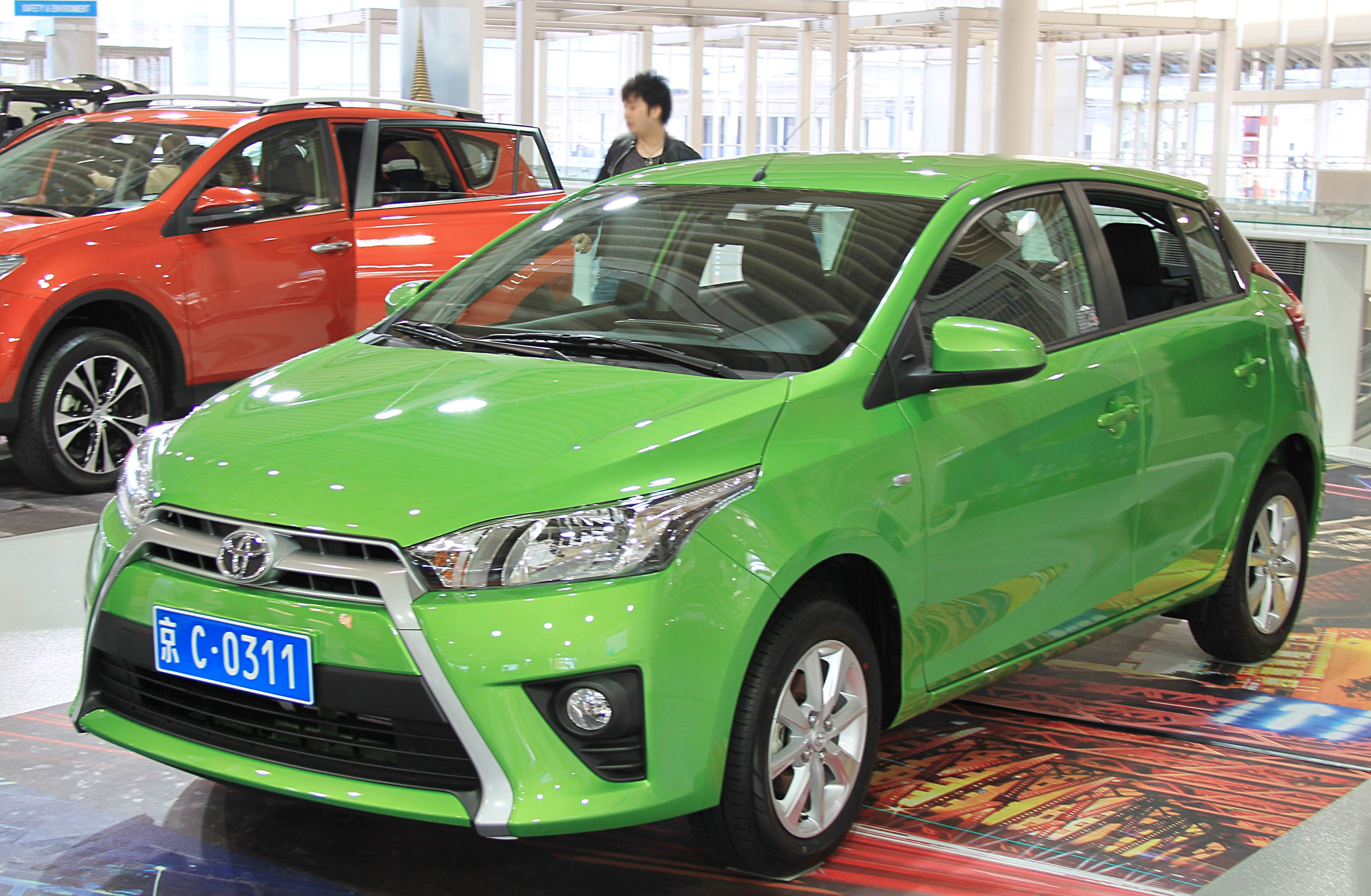
Toyota Yaris hatchback

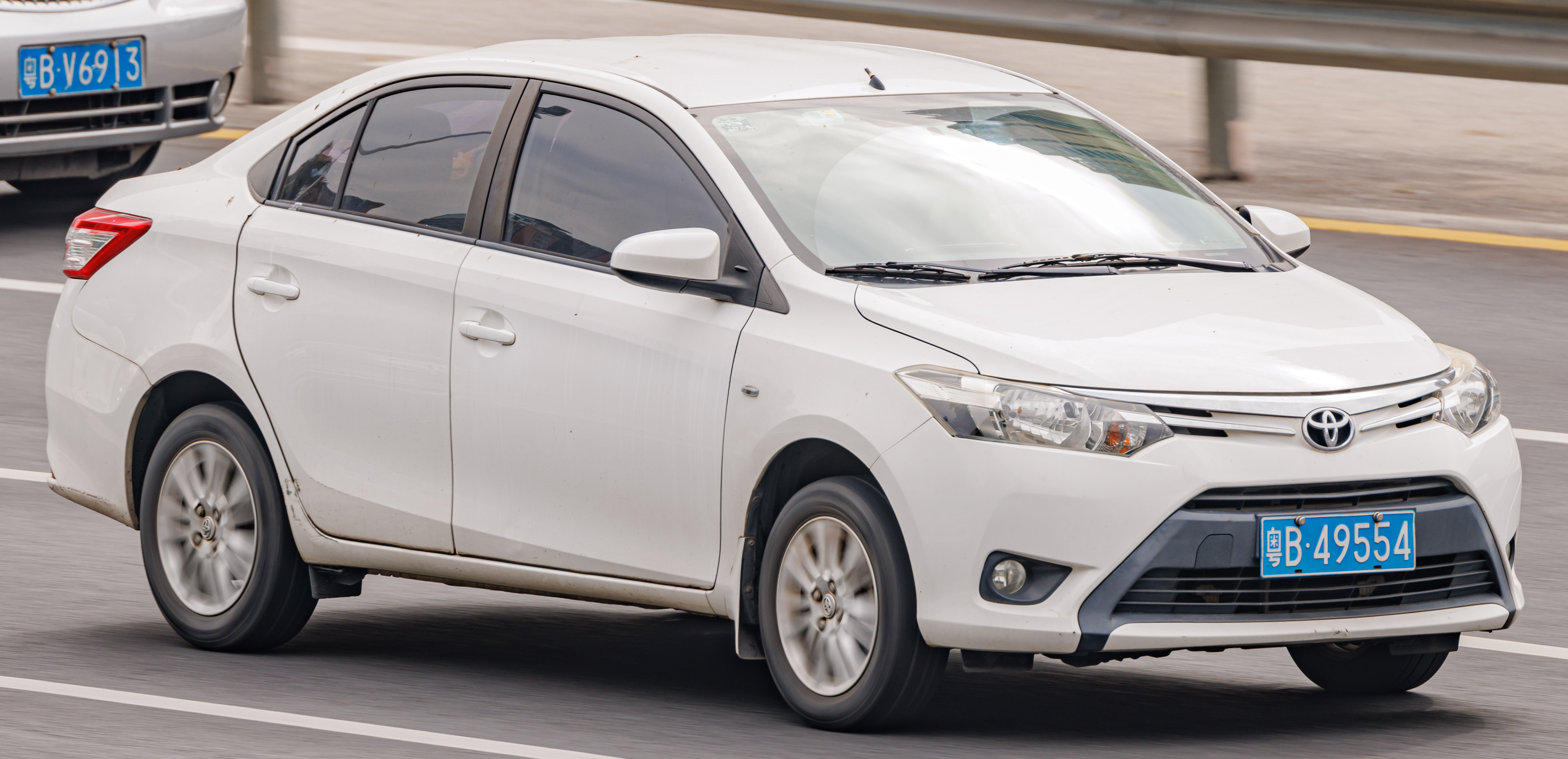
Toyota Vios/Yaris sedan

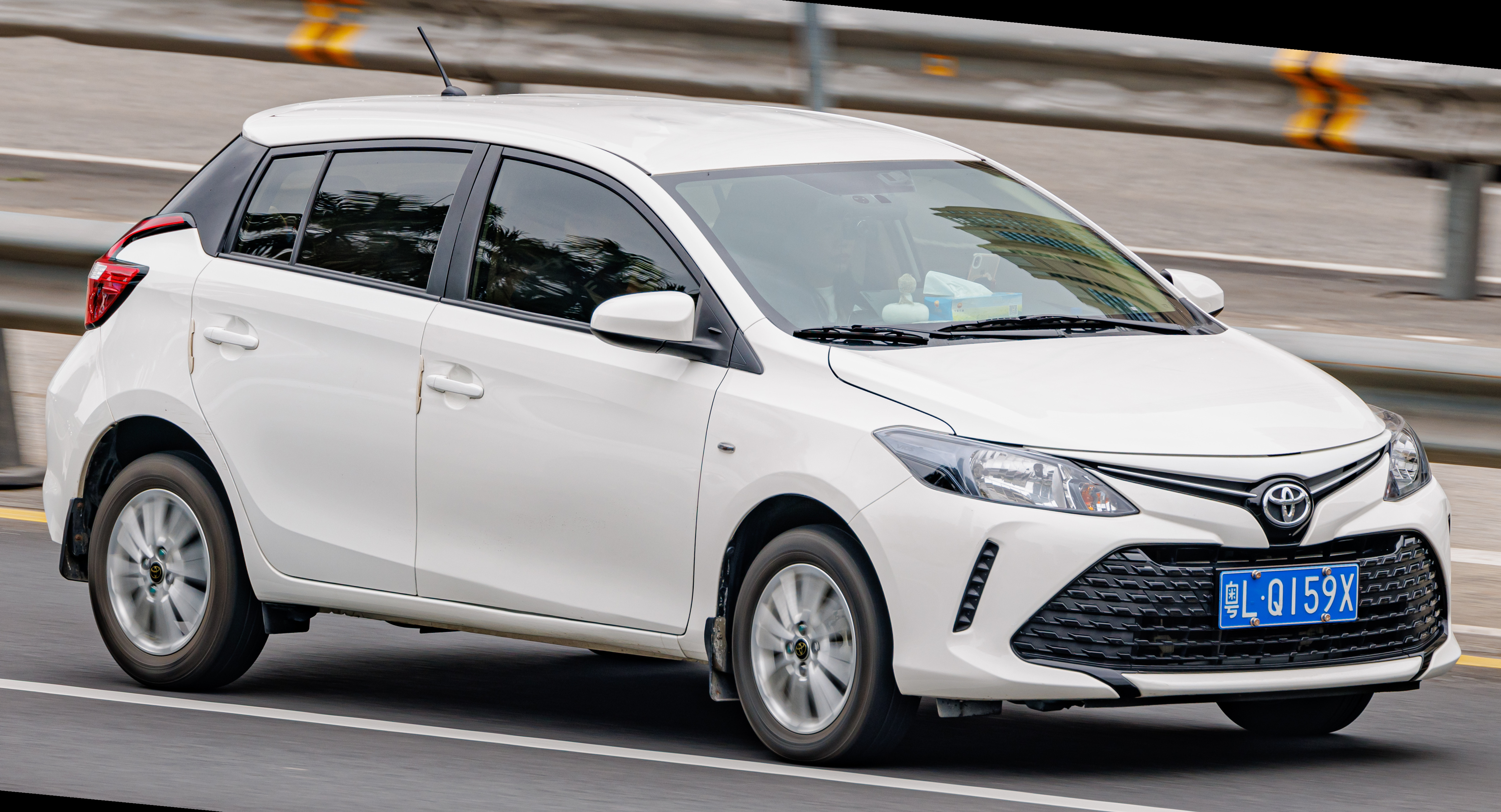
Toyota Vios FS

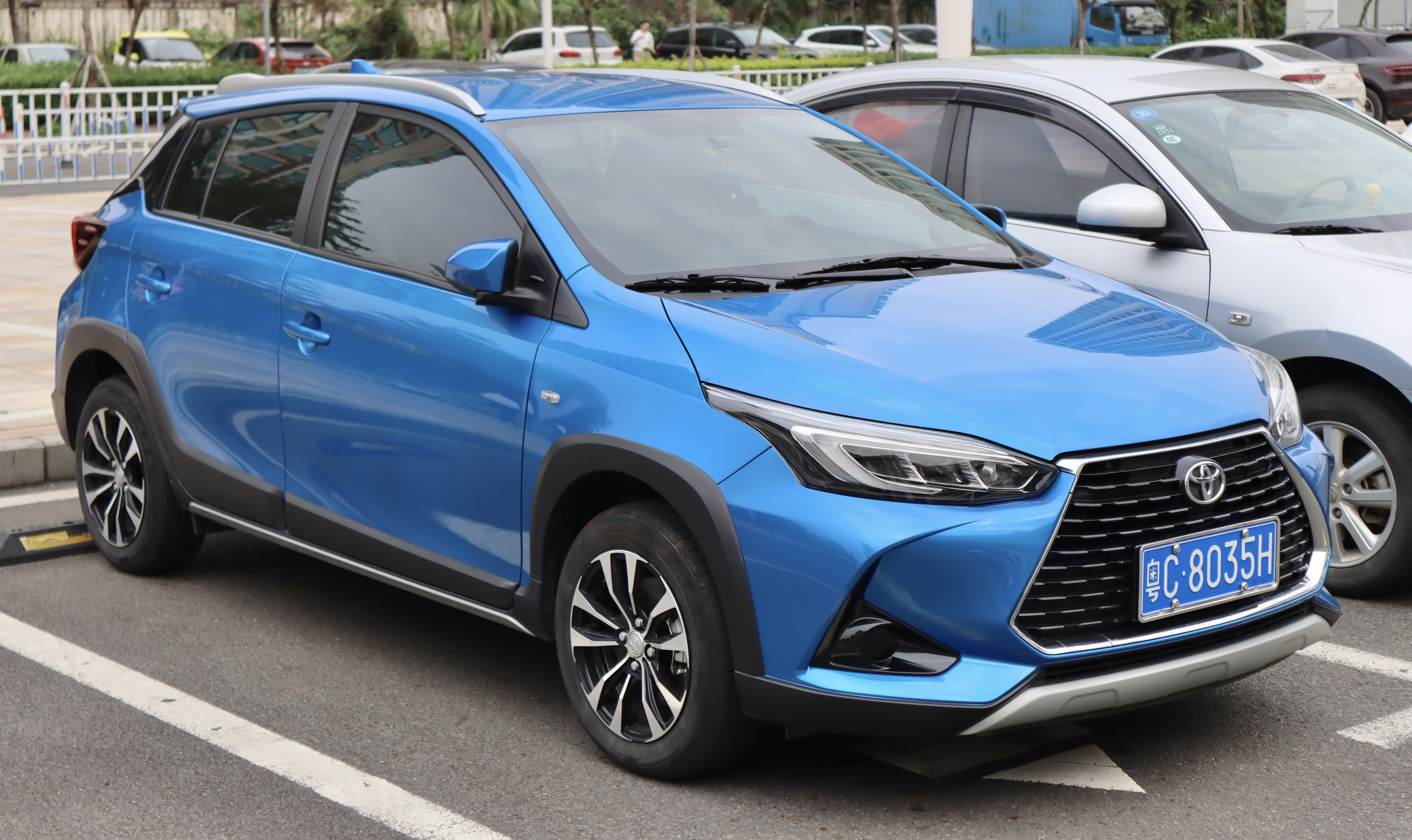
Toyota Yaris L X
