= Toyota Sienta =

Compact multi-purpose vehicle

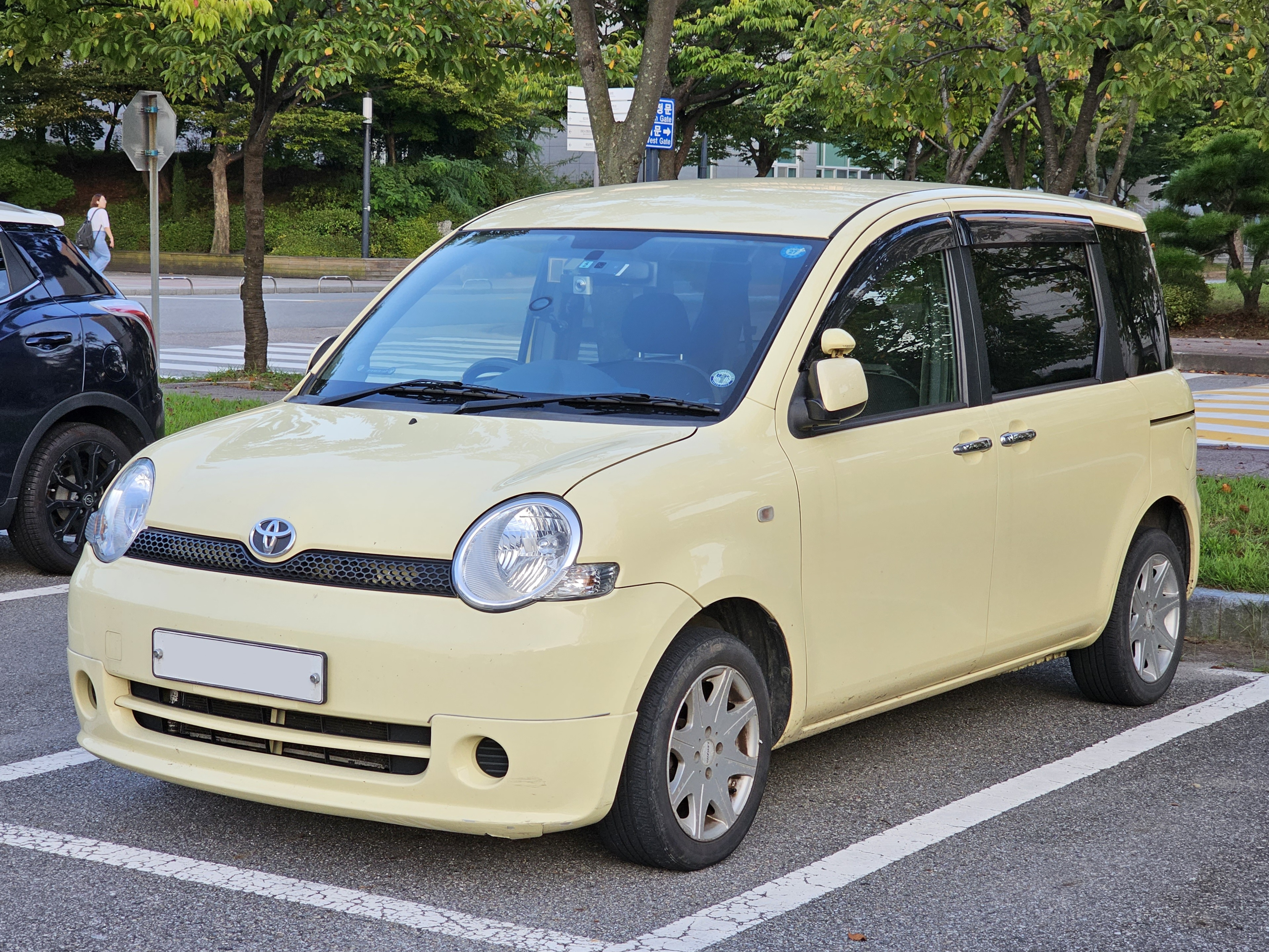
- First generation Sienta (XP80; pre-facelift)

Overview
- Manufacturer: Toyota
- Production: 2003–present

Body and chassis
- Class: Mini MPV
- Body style: 5-door minivan
- Layout: Front-engine, front-wheel-drive; Front-engine, four-wheel-drive (Japan only)

The Toyota Sienta (Japanese: トヨタ・シエンタ, Hepburn: Toyota Shienta) is a mini MPV with sliding doors manufactured by Toyota. It was introduced in September 2003, based on the Vitz/Yaris subcompact car, and is available at all Toyota dealerships in Japan. The Sienta is sold in Japan, Hong Kong, Singapore, Indonesia, Taiwan, Laos, and Thailand. As of 2022, it is positioned below the Noah/Voxy and above the Roomy in Toyota's MPV lineup in Japan. In Indonesia and Thailand, it serves as an upmarket alternative to the Avanza and fills the gap between Avanza and the larger Innova.

The "Sienta" name is derived from the Spanish word "siete", which means "seven" (referring to its maximum passenger capacity) and English word "entertain".

== First generation (XP80; 2003) ==
First generation
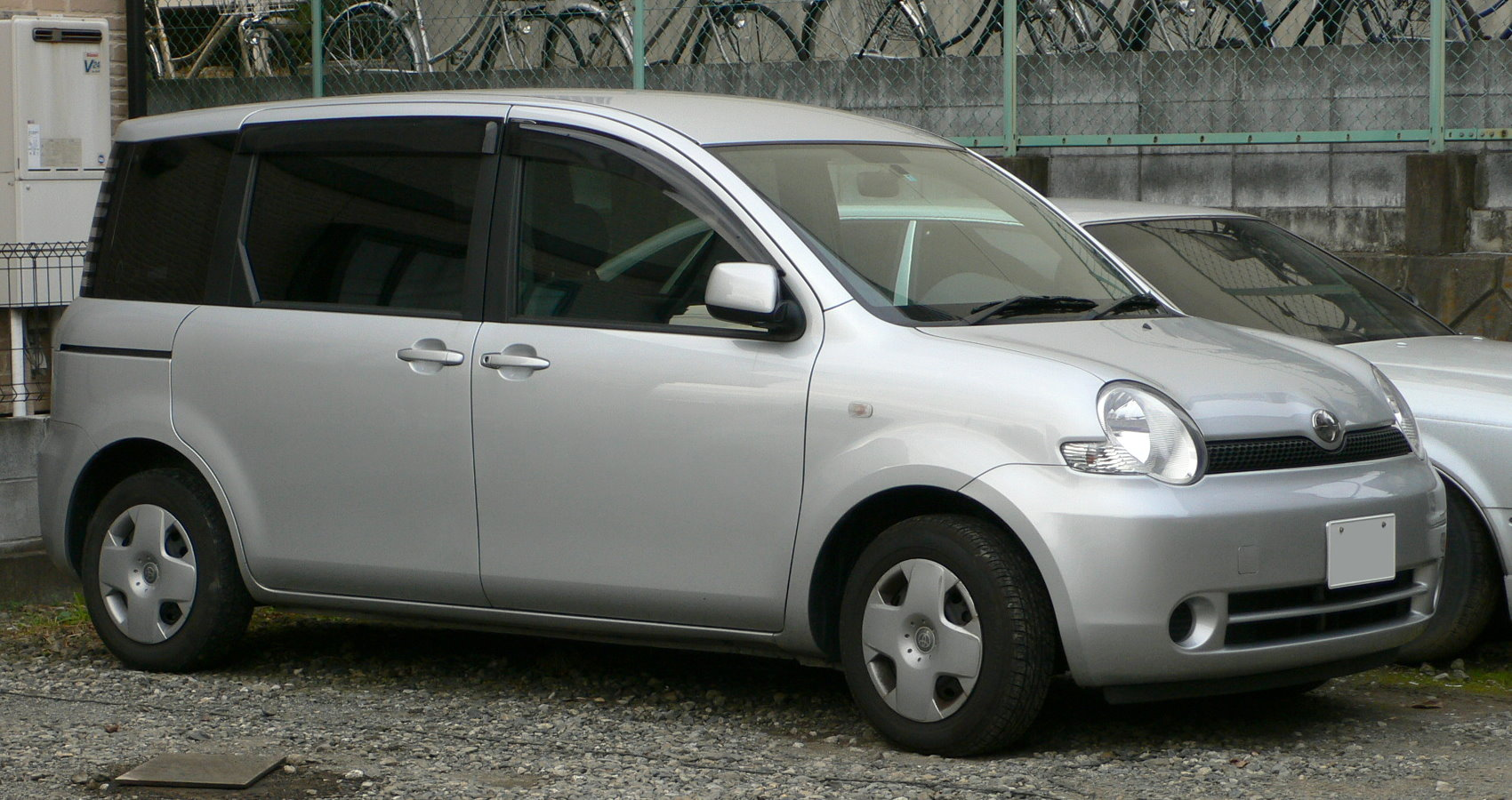
- 2003 Toyota Sienta G (pre-facelift)

Overview
- Model code: XP80
- Production: September 2003 – November 2010; May 2011 – June 2015 (DICE)
- Assembly: Japan: Toyota, Aichi (Takaoka plant, until 2006); Japan: Ōyamazaki, Kyoto (Daihatsu, from 2006)
- Designer: Hiroaki Hakamata (2001); Takumi Sasaki (2006 facelift: 2004)

Body and chassis
- Platform: Toyota NBC platform
- Related: Toyota Vitz (XP10); Toyota Porte (AP10)

Powertrain
- Engine: Petrol: 1.5 L 1NZ-FE I4 (NCP81/85)
- Power output: 81 kW (110 PS; 108 hp)
- Transmission: CVT (FWD); 4-speed automatic (4WD)

Dimensions
- Wheelbase: 2,700 mm (106.3 in)
- Length: 4,100 mm (161.4 in); 4,200 mm (165.4 in) (Dice)
- Width: 1,695 mm (66.7 in)
- Height: 1,670–1,680 mm (65.7–66.1 in)
- Kerb weight: 1,210–1,310 kg (2,668–2,888 lb)

The first generation Sienta was introduced on 29 September 2003 in Japan, which is the only market it was sold in. The car can also be found in numerous other countries through parallel imports. The Sienta combines two platforms: the front half uses the smaller Vitz/Yaris' NBC platform, while the rear half uses the larger MC platform of the Corolla Spacio (E120).

Initially available in 3 grades: X "E Package", X, and G. front-wheel drive was available in all grades, but four-wheel drive only offered in X and G grades. The Welcab variant is also available.

The Sienta received a facelift on 16 May 2006, three years after its introduction. The grille was given a transverse bar and the taillights were redesigned, with three ribbons and a round element rather than the original design's eight ribbons. New colours were added, such as Apple Green, Gun-Metal Grey, and Metallic Blue. Another upgrade found on the facelifted models is double electric-powered sliding doors. At the time of the facelift, production was moved from Toyota's Takaoka plant to Daihatsu's Kyoto plant.

Powered by a 1.5 L VVT-i petrol engine capable of 110 PS (81 kW) at 6,000 rpm, the Sienta comes equipped with CVT. ABS and EBD are standard.

The G-BOOK, a subscription telematics service, is offered as an option.

Toyota temporarily stopped selling the Sienta in the third quarter of 2010 as sales had slowed and it was to have been replaced by the new Toyota Passo Sette. As the Passo Sette proved not to be particularly successful, Toyota listened to the demands of their customers and sales of the Sienta resumed in May 2011. The reintroduced model did not feature any significant changes aside from renamed trim levels and a new, sportier model, the Sienta Dice (stylised as "DICE"), with a different design with squared off headlights. The taillights were also redesigned, removing the circular element. Production continued until June 2015.

=== Gallery ===
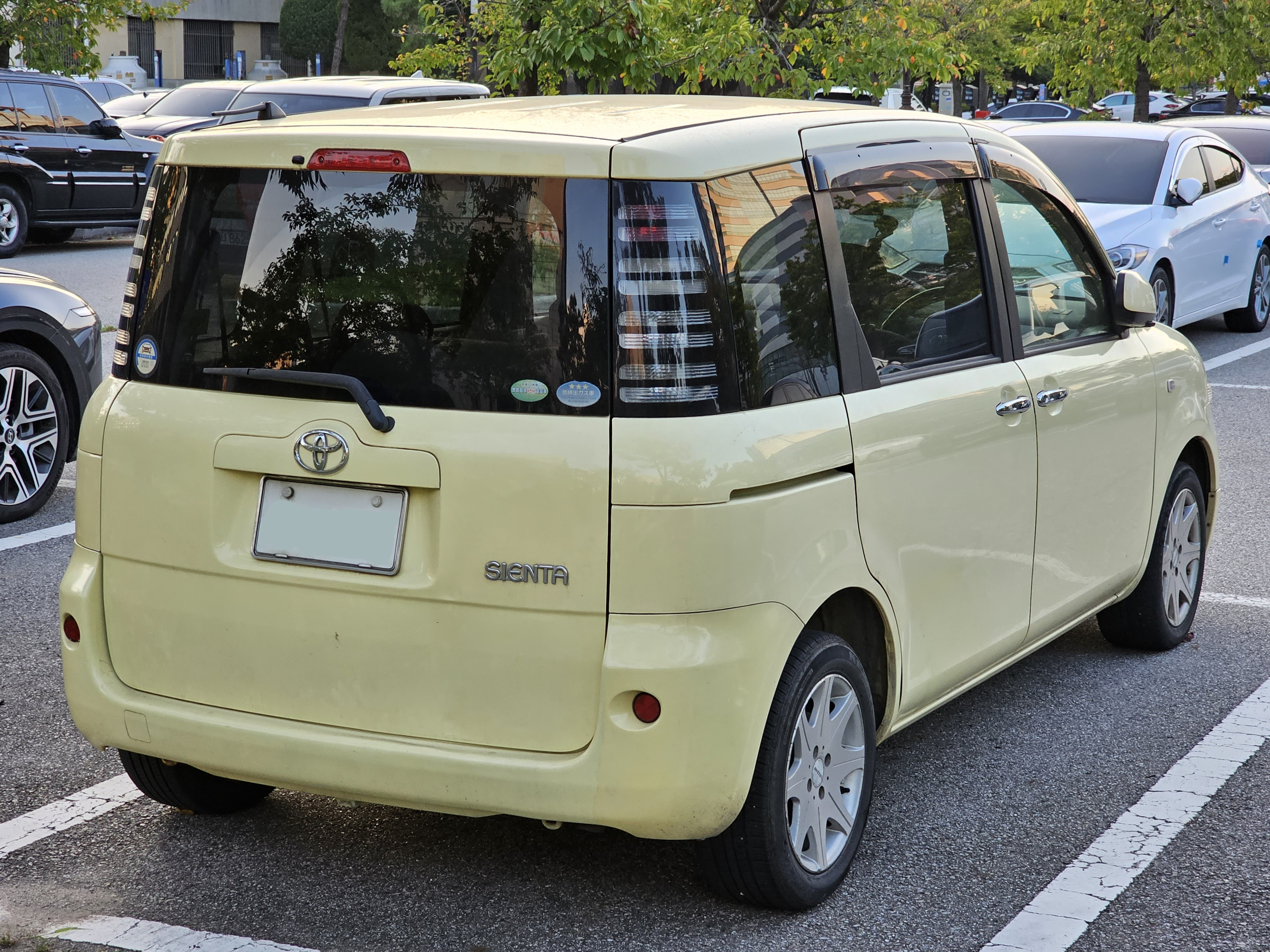
Rear view (pre-facelift)

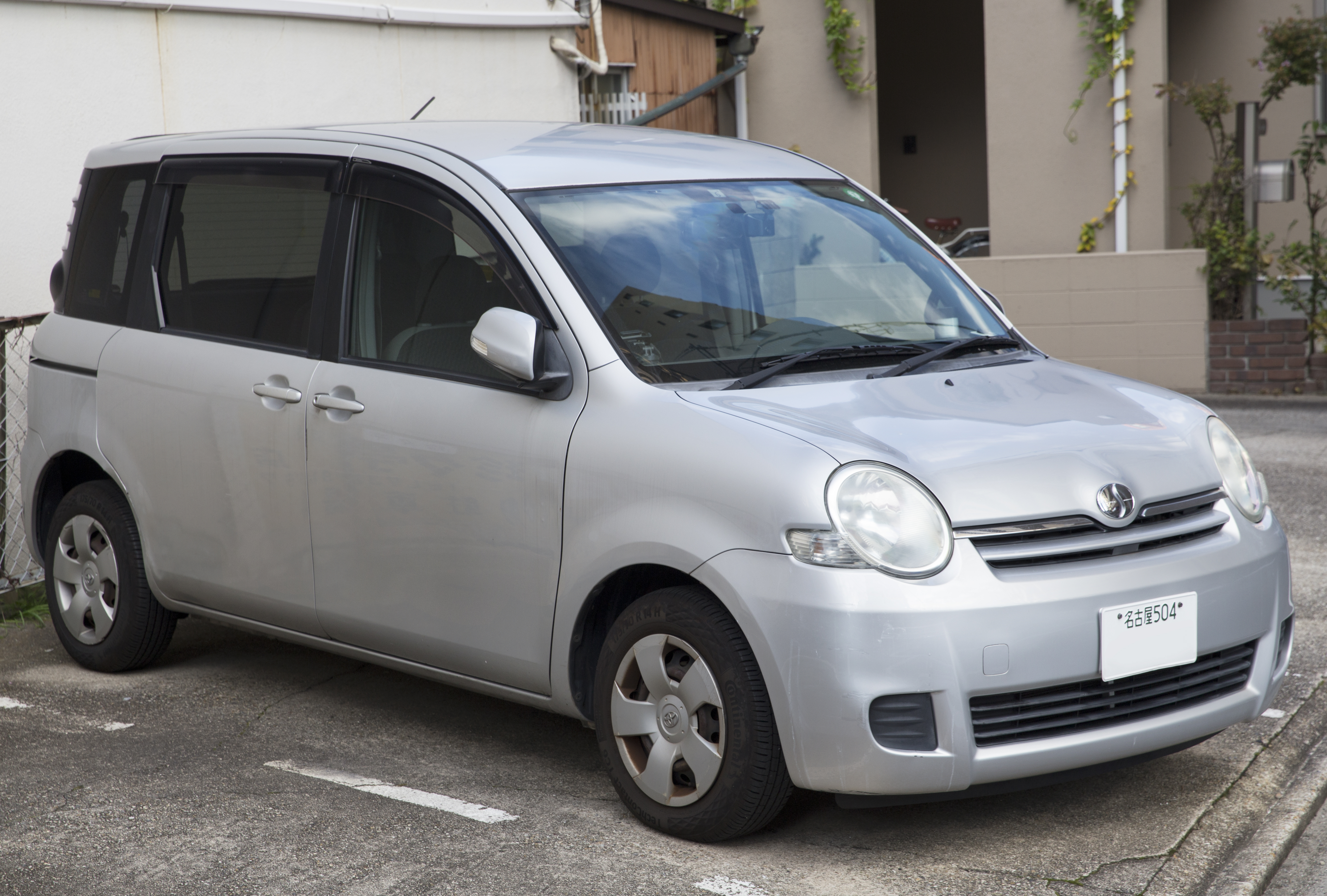
2006 Toyota Sienta 1.5 G (first-facelift; Japan)

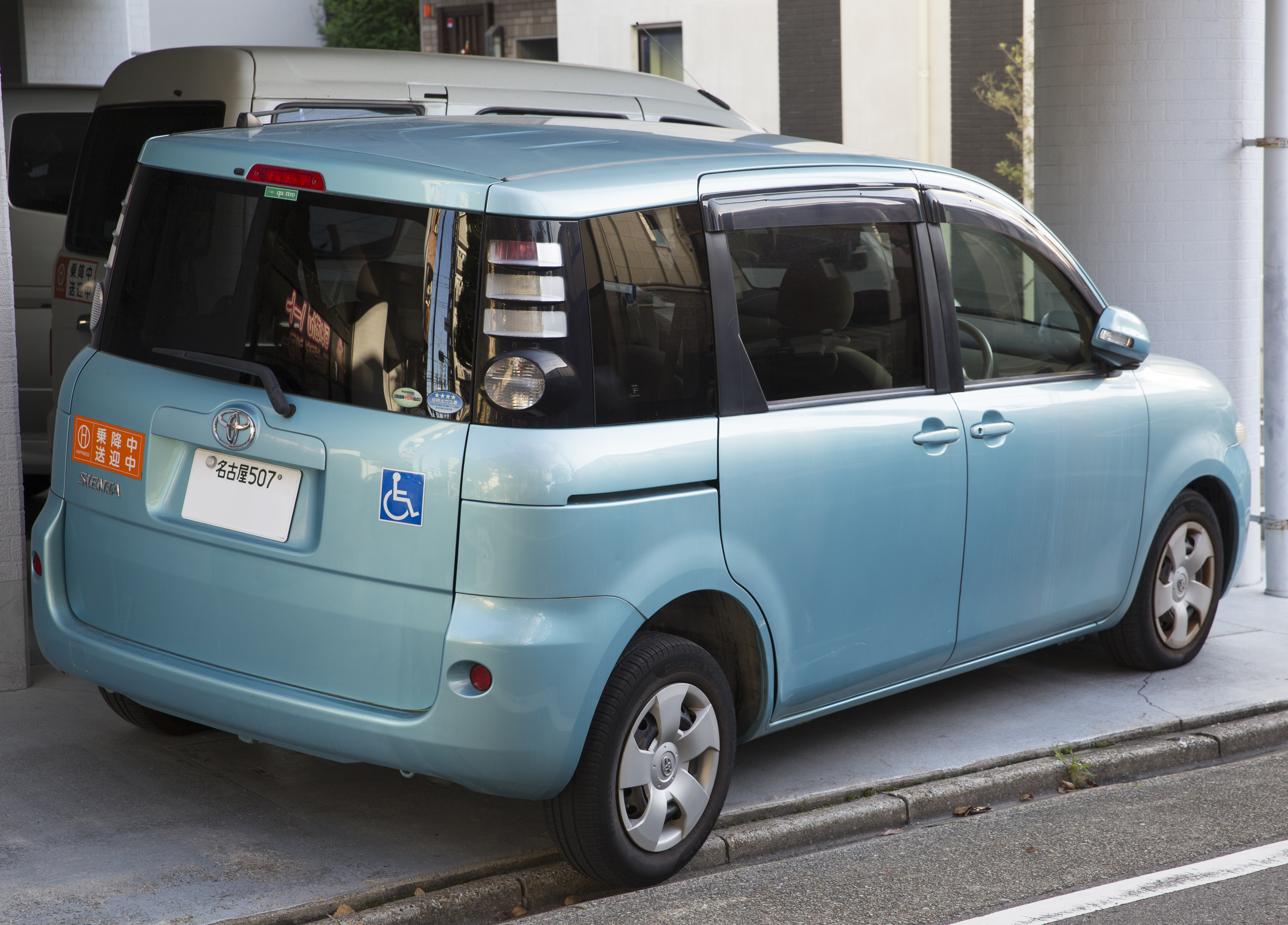
2006 Toyota Sienta 1.5 G (first-facelift; Japan)

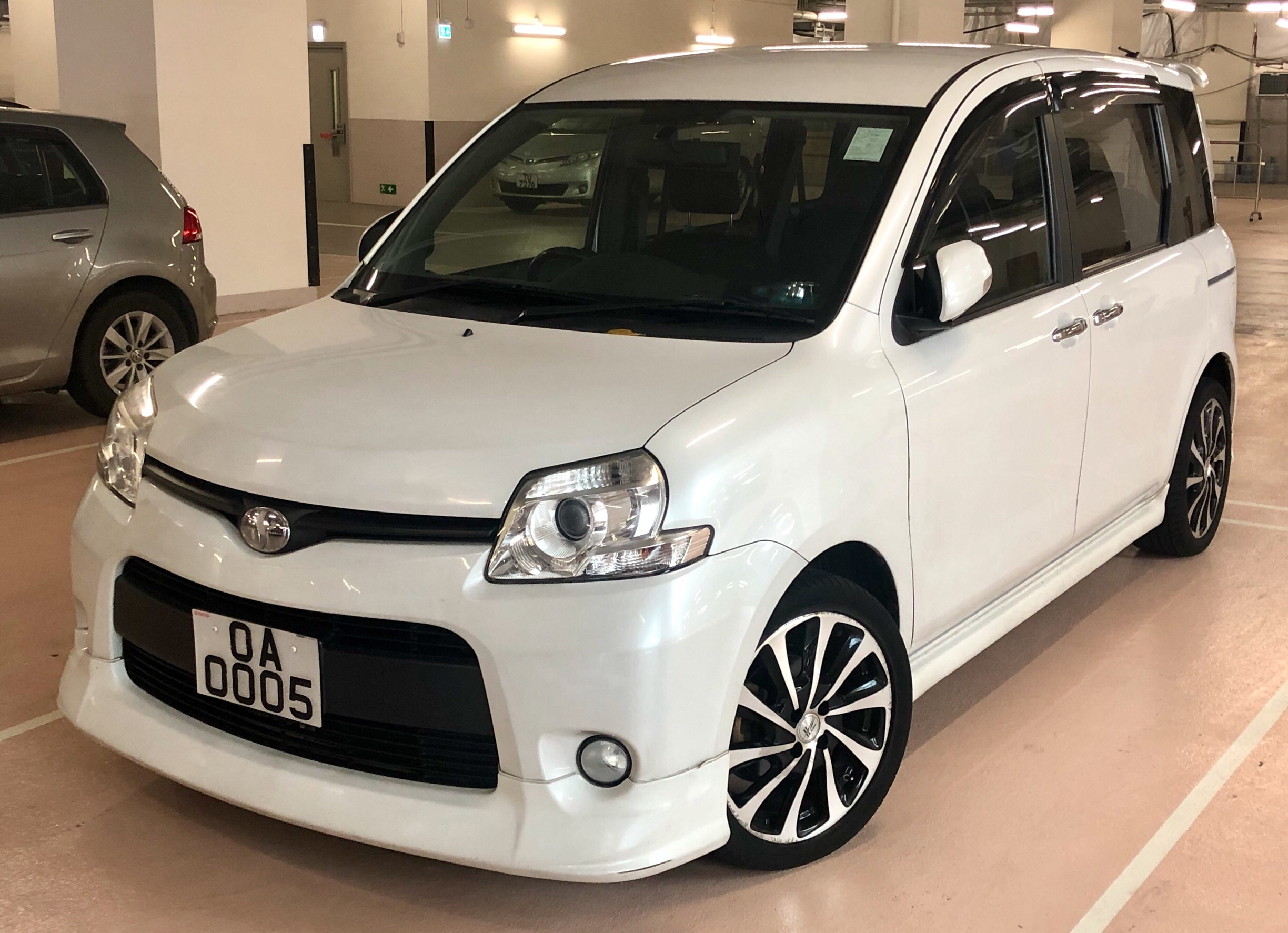
2011–2015 Sienta Dice (Hong Kong)

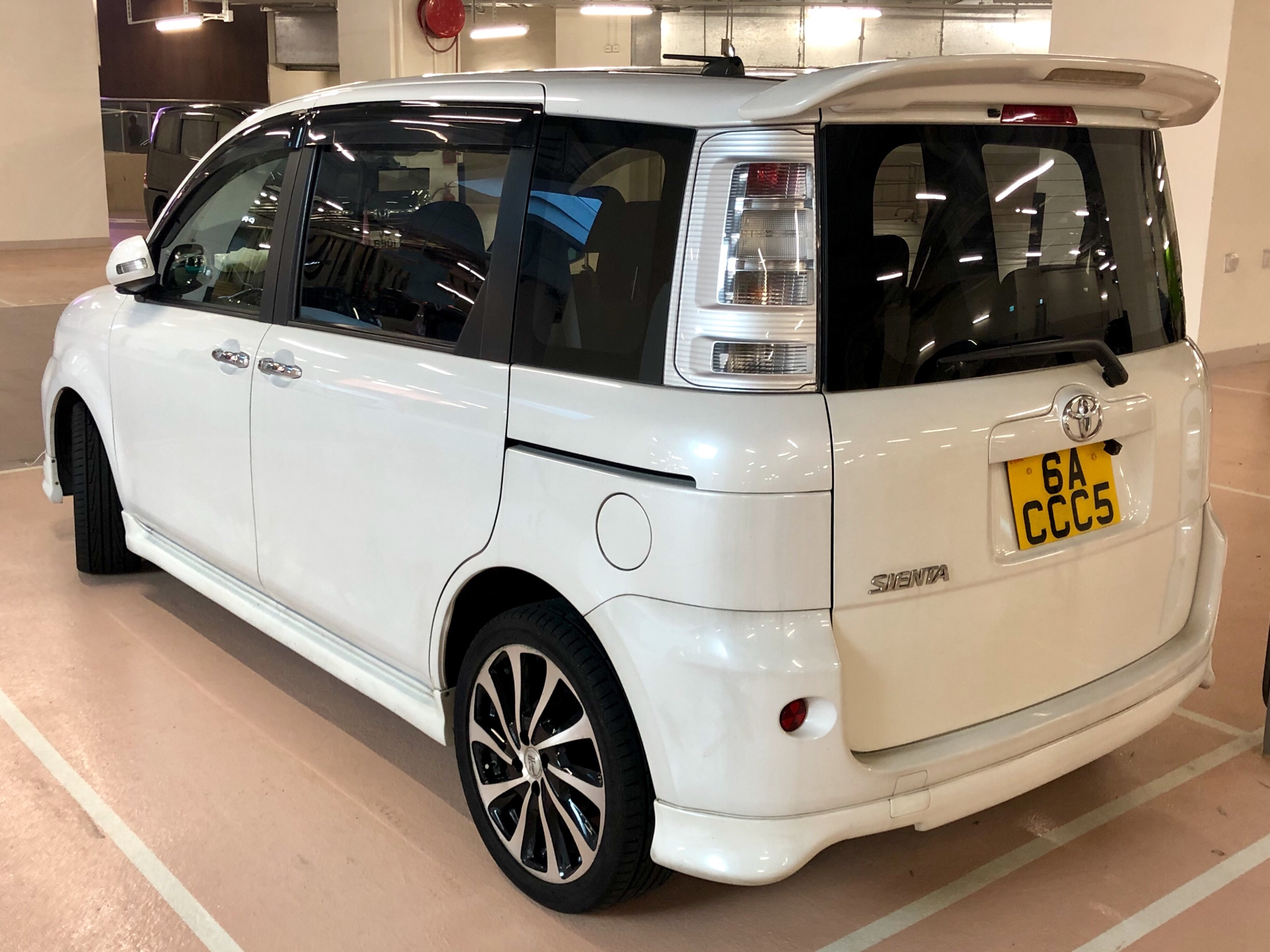
2011–2015 Sienta Dice (Hong Kong)

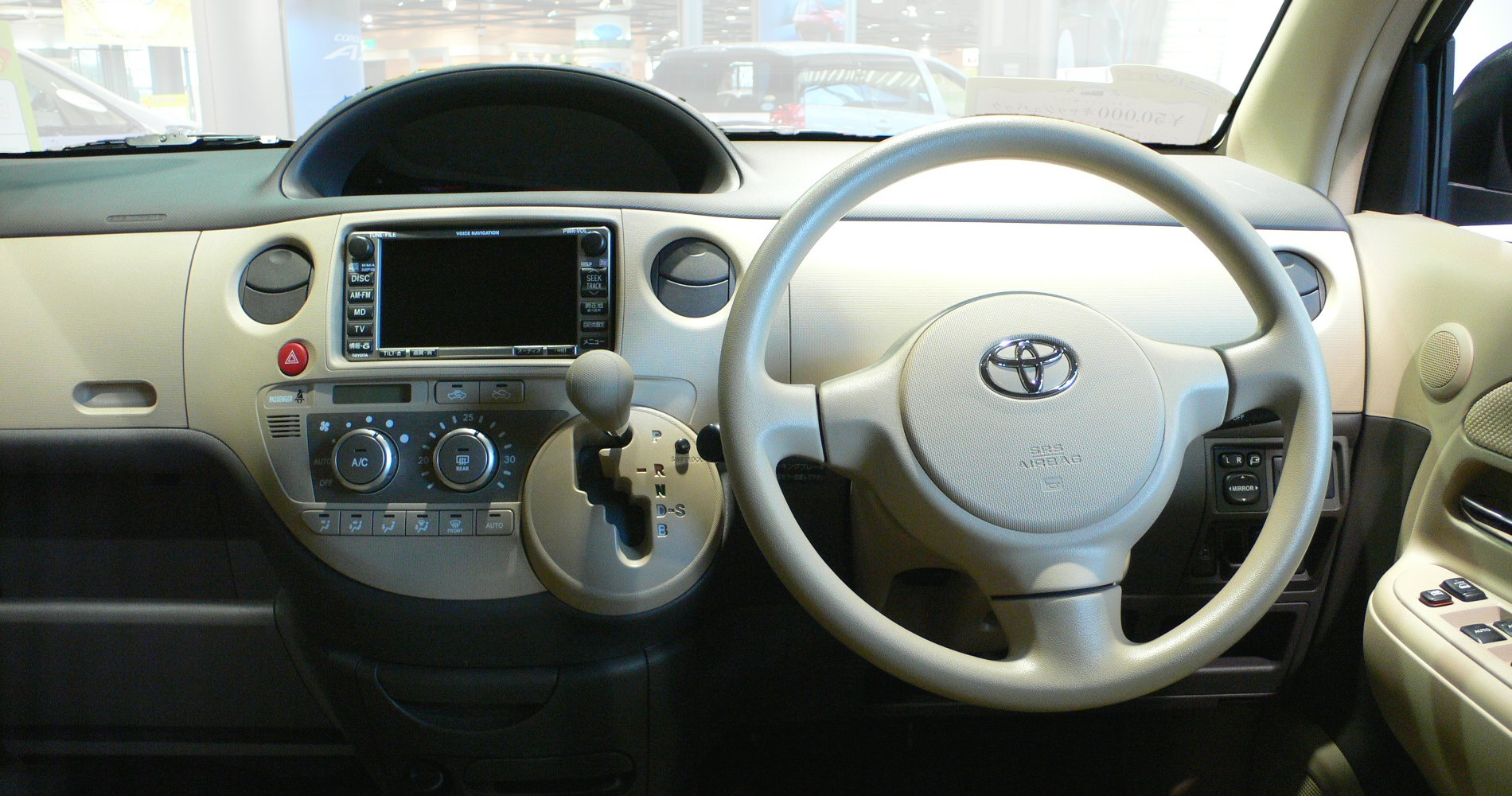
Interior (2006 facelift)

== Second generation (XP170; 2015) ==
Second generation
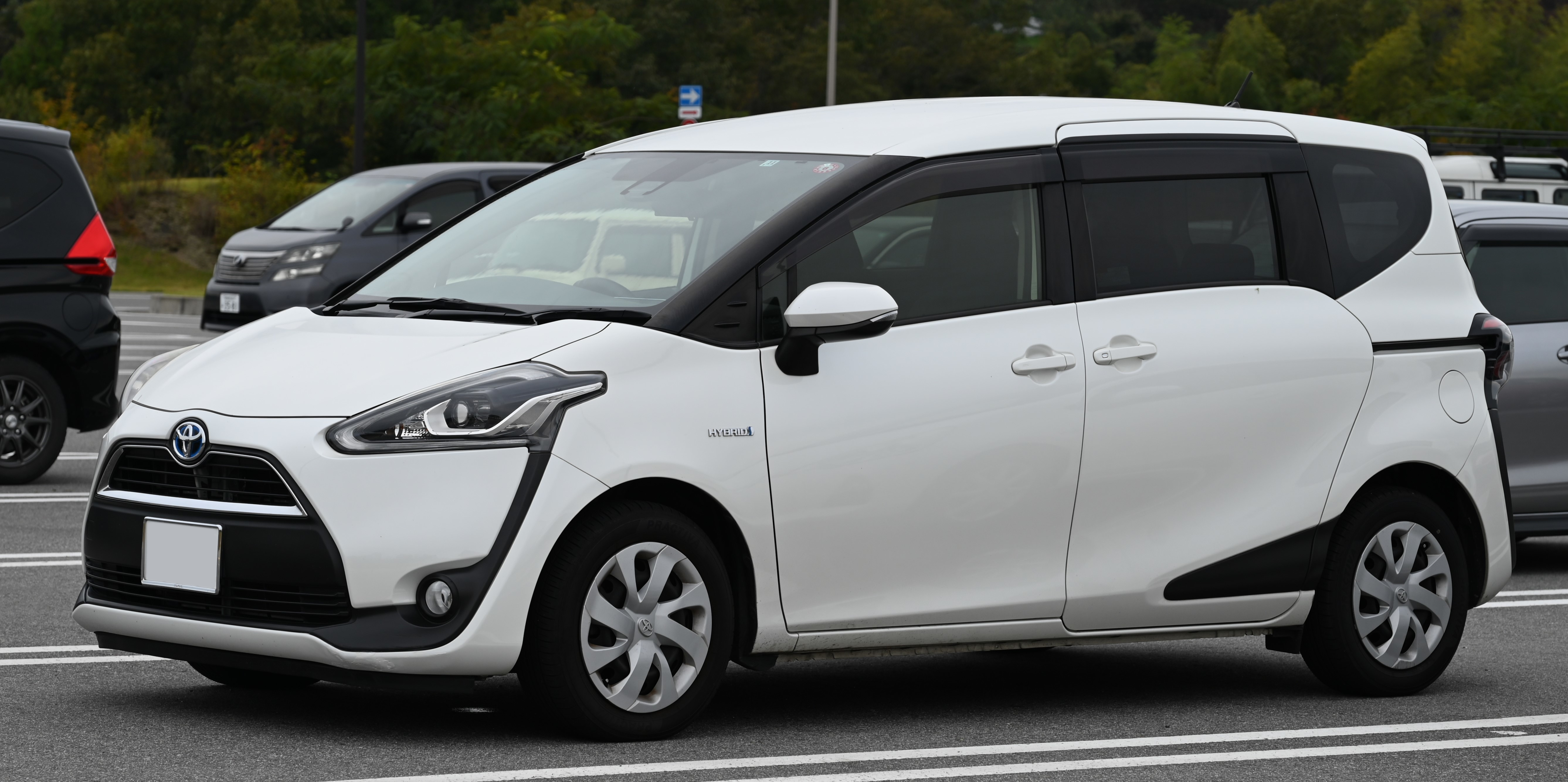
- Toyota Sienta Hybrid G (pre-facelift; Japan)

Overview
- Model code: XP170
- Production: July 2015 – July 2022 (Japan); June 2016 – February 2023 (Indonesia); October 2016 – January 2025 (Taiwan)
- Assembly: Japan: Ōhira, Miyagi (TMEJ); Indonesia: Karawang, West Java (TMMIN); Taiwan: Guanyin (Kuozui Motors)
- Designer: Hiroshi Kayukawa (2013)

Body and chassis
- Platform: Toyota B platform
- Related: Toyota Vitz (XP130); Toyota Porte/Spade (XP140); Toyota JPN Taxi

Powertrain
- Engine: Petrol: 1.5 L 2NR-FE I4 (NSP170, Taiwan and Southeast Asia); 1.5 L 2NR-FKE VVT-iE I4 (NSP170/172, Japan); 1.5 L 1NZ-FE I4 (NCP175, Japan); 1.8 L 2ZR-FAE I4 (ZSP170, Taiwan); Petrol hybrid: 1.5 L 1NZ-FXE I4 (NHP170, Japan)
- Electric motor: 45 kW (60 hp; 61 PS) 2LM AC permanent-magnet synchronous (hybrid)
- Transmission: 6-speed manual (Southeast Asia); CVT; eCVT (hybrid)
- Hybrid drivetrain: Power-split (hybrid)
- Battery: 6.5 Ah nickel–metal hydride (hybrid)

Dimensions
- Wheelbase: 2,750 mm (108.3 in)
- Length: 4,235–4,260 mm (166.7–167.7 in); 4,350 mm (171.3 in) (Sienta Crossover)
- Width: 1,695 mm (66.7 in)
- Height: 1,675–1,695 mm (65.9–66.7 in); 1,700 mm (66.9 in) (Sienta Crossover)
- Kerb weight: 1,310–1,370 kg (2,888–3,020 lb)

Chronology
- Predecessor: Toyota Ractis (Japan, Sienta Funbase); Toyota Passo Sette (Japan); Toyota Wish (Taiwan)

The second generation Sienta debuted on 9 July 2015. It ditched the box-like shape of its predecessor for an updated exterior design inspired by the shape of a trekking shoe.

The minivan offers three interior layouts: 7-seater, 6-seater, and 5-seater (for wheelchair users). Interior space has been increased in all areas compared to the previous generation model. There is also a hybrid variant, which returns 27.2 km/L (77 mpg_{‑imp}; 64 mpg_{‑US}) under the Japanese JC08 cycle test, making it eligible for eco-car subsidies and tax incentives. The non-hybrid Sienta returns 20.6 km/L (58 mpg_{‑imp}; 48 mpg_{‑US}) in FWD configuration. A “Stop & Start System” is offered as standard. The second generation Sienta is also the first to be sold in Hong Kong and is also available in Singapore.

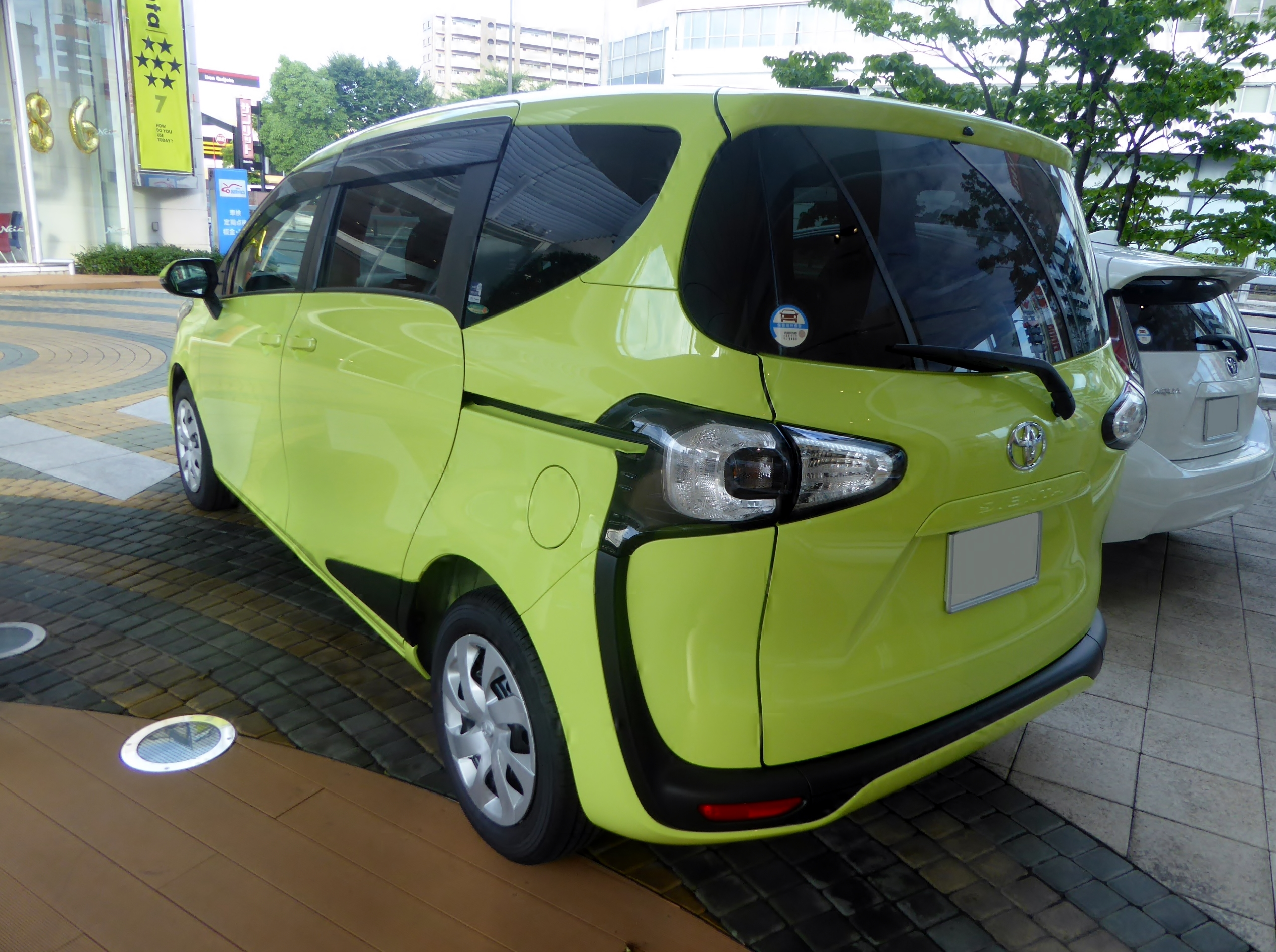
Sienta X (pre-facelift; Japan)

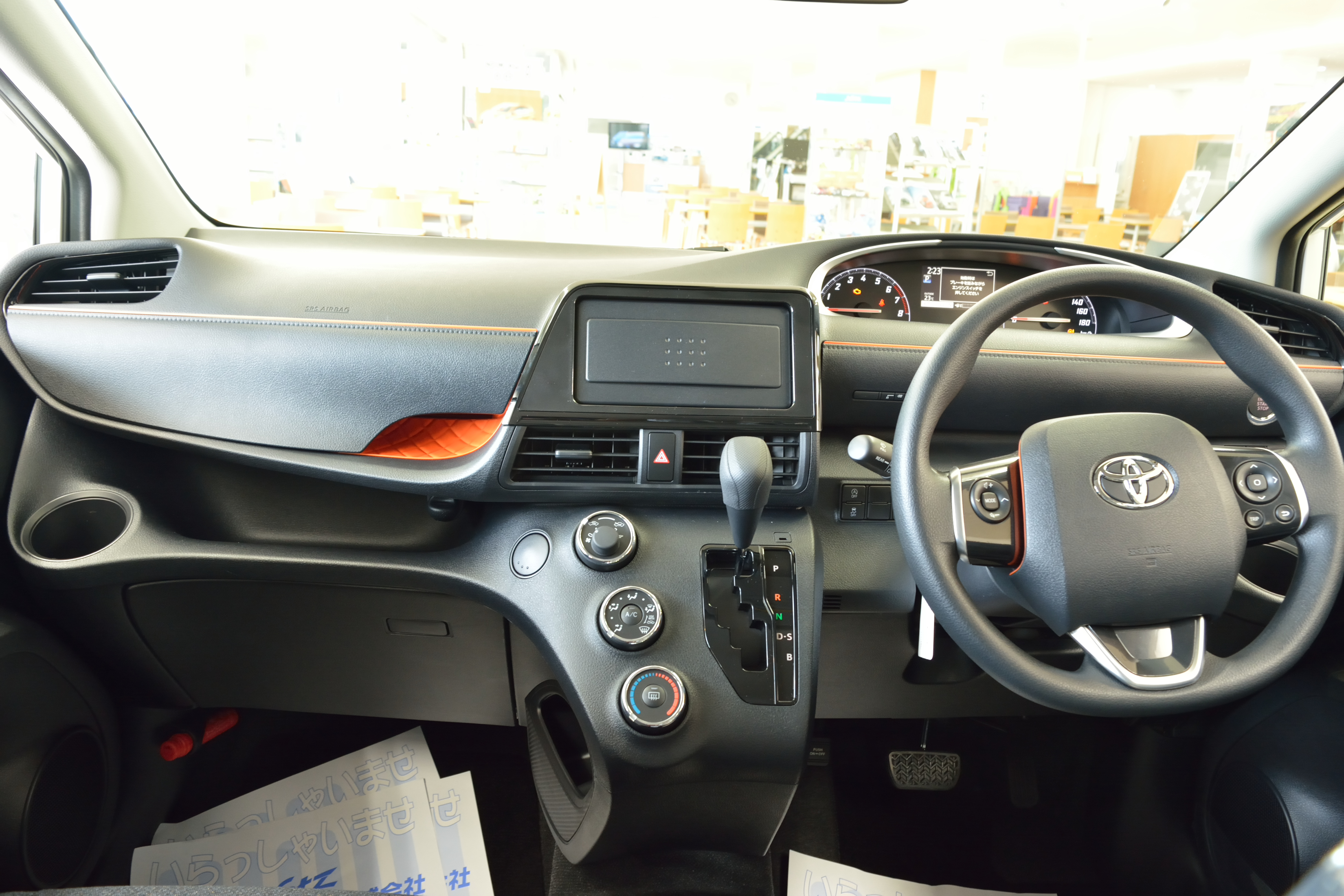
Interior

=== Markets ===
==== Japan ====
Initially, the Sienta was available in X, G, Hybrid X, and Hybrid G trim levels in Japan.

Like its predecessor, the Welcab model accommodates various wheelchairs. The second seat on the passenger side can be folded down to allow wheelchair users to board the vehicle. Furthermore, the adoption of a manual forward-tilting ramp function allows the vehicle to be used as a regular car with two rows of seats and five seats, providing luggage space when not in use

In 2017, the special edition G Cuero was released. Based on the G grade, it features exclusive seat upholstery combining synthetic leather and high-grade fabric, as well as orange stitching on the seats, shift knob, and steering wheel. It also comes specially equipped with features that are optional on the base model, such as the "Toyota Safety Sense C".

==== Indonesia ====
The second generation Sienta was launched at the 24th Indonesia International Motor Show on 7 April 2016.Production of the Indonesian-spec Sienta at Toyota Motor Manufacturing Indonesia plant in Karawang, West Java began in late June 2016 and sales began on 26 July 2016. Initial trim levels were E, G, V, and Q (equipped with body kits). To meet the standard geological conditions in Indonesia, it is 20 mm (1 in) higher than the Japanese market Sienta. The shift knob location also moved to the floor to accommodate the 6-speed manual transmission, as well as the grip handbrake. The air conditioning knob was also redesigned.

Some visual differences as compared to the units sold in Japan were that it does not feature the 'Sienta' badging embossed on the tailgate handle, instead, the model badge name is on the tailgate itself, and an additional rear foglamp is featured centre mounted on the rear bumper edge. In the interior, the aircon instrumental panel and controls were different and gear shift and handbrake lever were repositioned to the interior floor instead on the dashboard. It uses a 2NR-FE 1.5-litre Dual VVT-i engine.

The Modellista body kits were also available as dealer-installed options, which is badged as "Limited". It was introduced in 2017 GIIAS and limited to 30 units.

The facelifted model removed the E trim from the lineup, followed later by G trim.

On 17 August 2020, the Welcab model based on the V trim was introduced.

The Sienta was pulled from the Indonesian market in early 2023, with the company choosing to focus on the strong selling Avanza and Veloz.

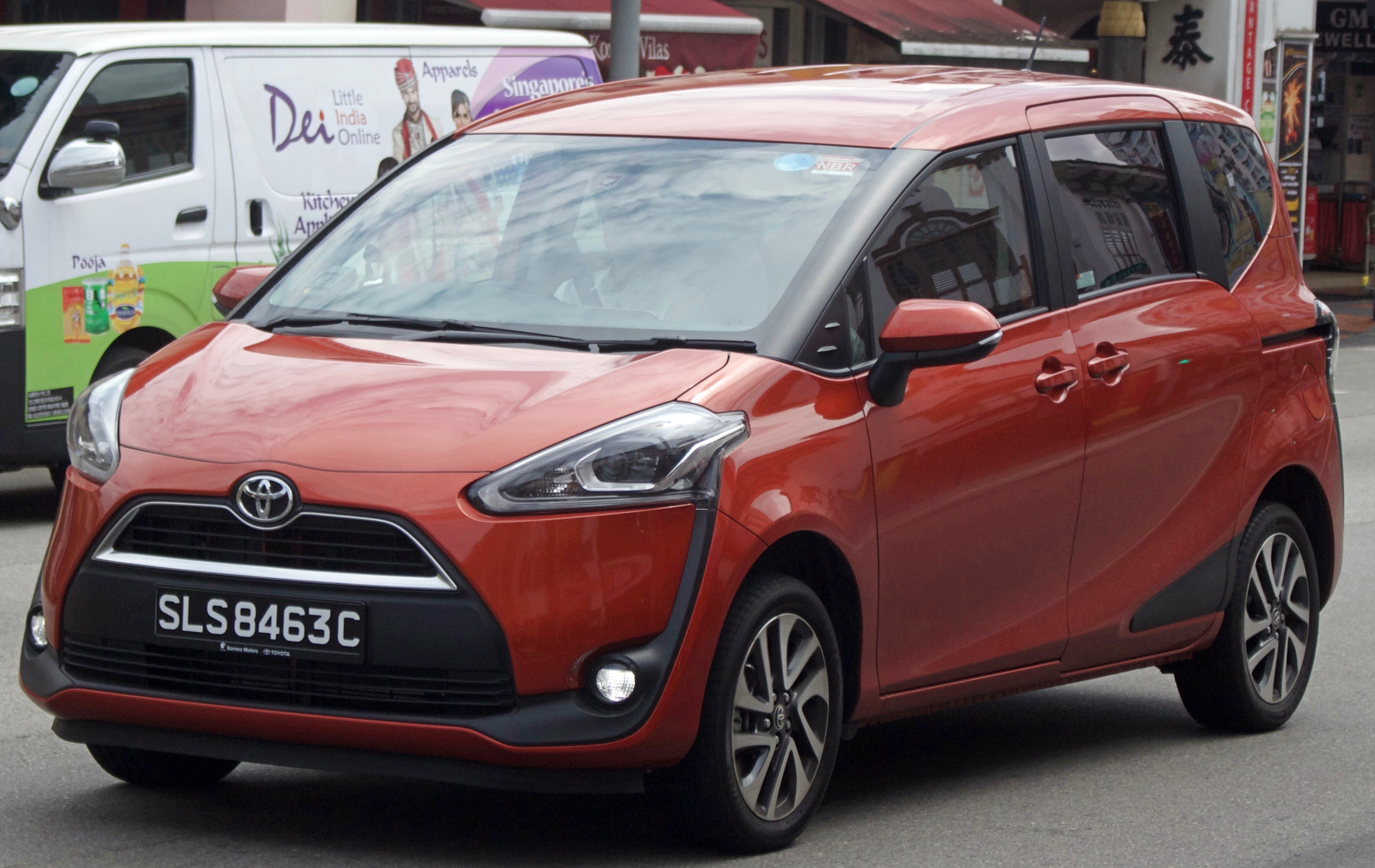
2017 Sienta 1.5 V (NSP170; pre-facelift, Singapore)

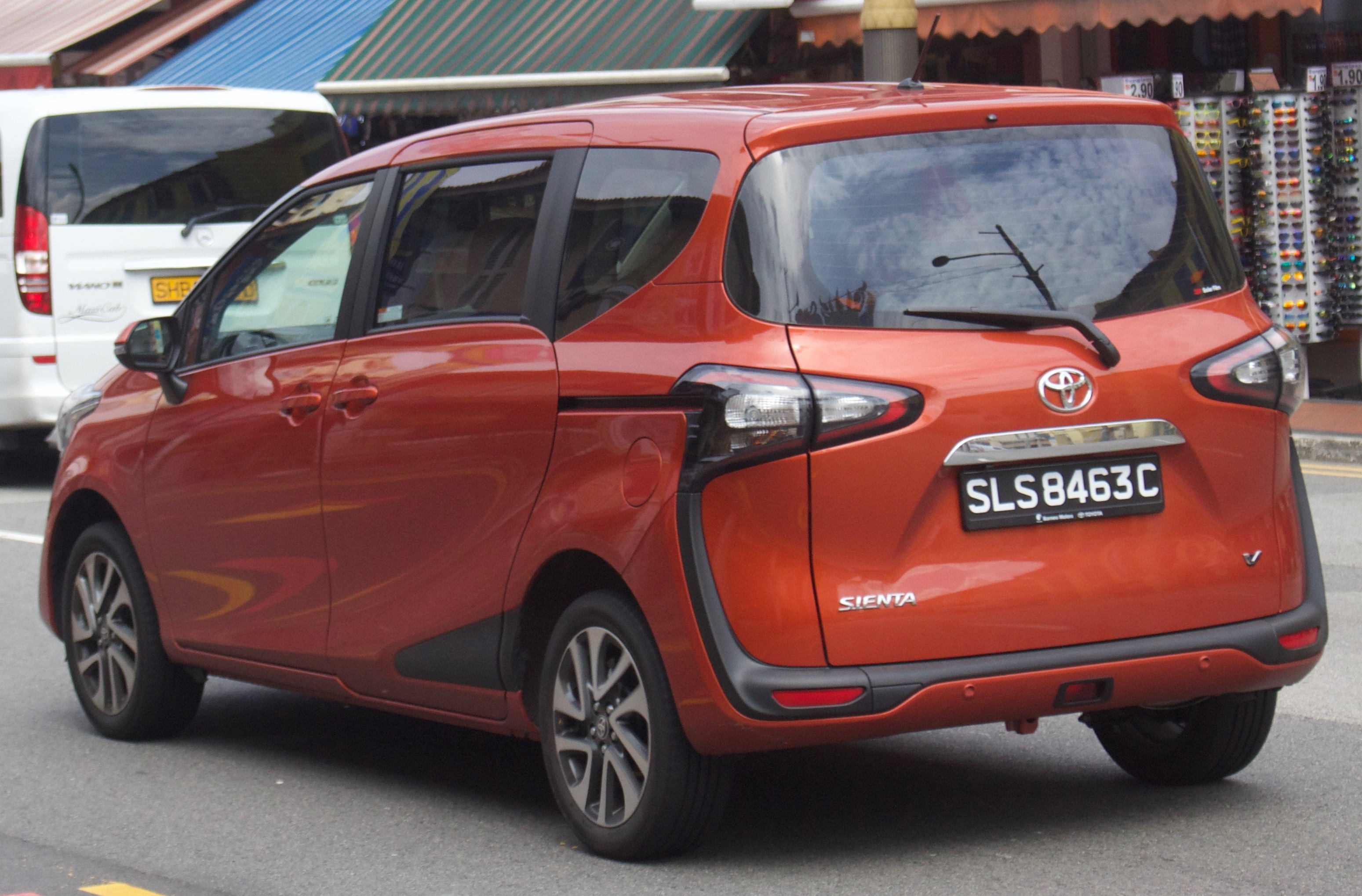
2017 Sienta 1.5 V (NSP170; pre-facelift, Singapore)

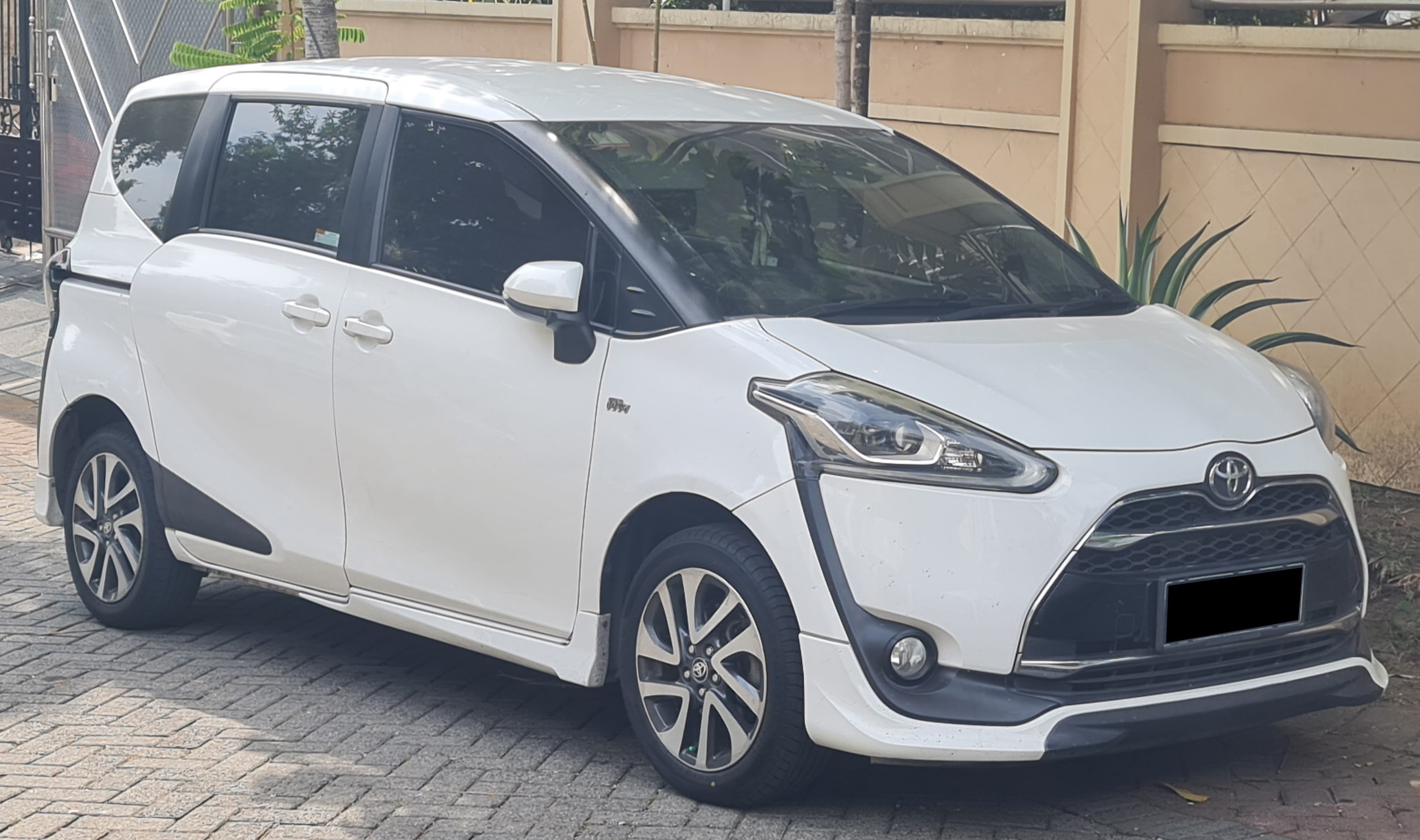
2016 Sienta 1.5 Q (pre-facelift; Indonesia)

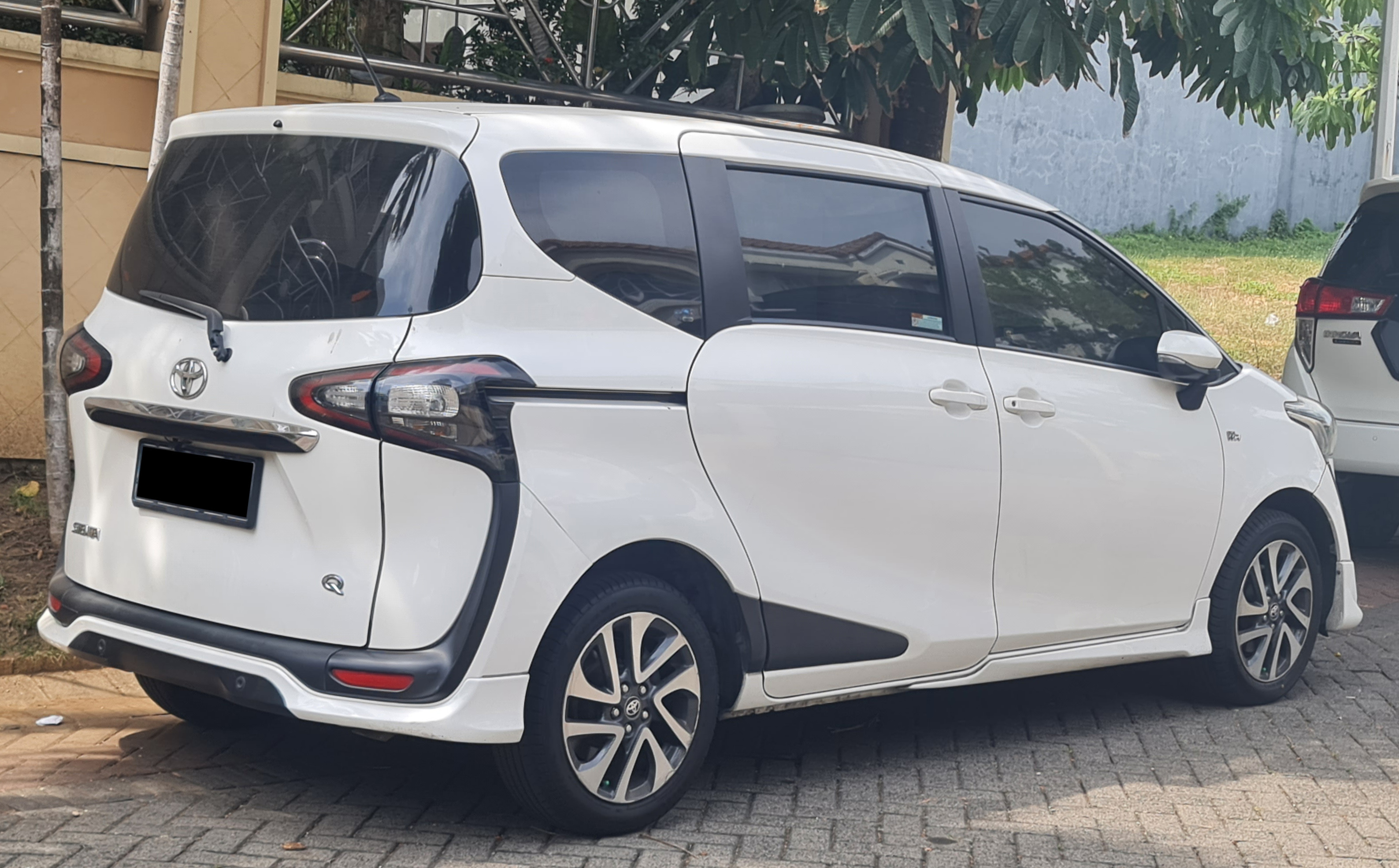
2016 Sienta 1.5 Q (pre-facelift; Indonesia)

==== Malaysia ====
The Malaysian-spec Sienta was launched on 17 August 2016, and is fully imported from Indonesia. Two trim levels are available, G and V. It was discontinued in late 2019.

==== Singapore ====
The Sienta is available both from Borneo Motors (Toyota's authorised dealer in Singapore) and parallel import distributors since 2016. V and G variants are available, (marketed as Standard and Elegance) from Borneo Motors, with specifications based on the Indonesian model, and are available with the 1.5L 2NR-FE Dual VVT-i engine; while hybrid models are only available from parallel importers.

==== Taiwan ====
The Sienta was introduced in Taiwan in October 2016 as the replacement of the Wish in the market. It is available with the 1.5-litre 2NR-FE engine and the 1.8-litre 2ZR-FAE engine with VSC, hill-start assists, and 2 airbags as standard features. It is manufactured in Guanyin, Taiwan, and it is produced and sold as a left-hand drive vehicle. The top-of-the-line adds dual beam LED headlamps, LED tail lamps, 6 airbags, a head-up unit, dual powered sliding rear doors, colour-screen trip meter, reversing camera, leather-wrapped steering wheel, and transmission knob, and a double layer of front windshield as the top of the standard features.

The crossover-styled variant of the Sienta, called Sienta Crossover, was announced in Taiwan on 7 December 2020. It is only available with the 1.8-litre 2ZR-FAE engine.

The Sienta was pulled from the Taiwan market in January 2025.

==== Thailand ====
The Sienta is available in Thailand in two trim levels, 1.5 G and 1.5 V. The top-of-the-line V trim adds dual beam LED lamps, push start and stop button, smart entry, Optitron trip meter, and automatic front AC on top of the standard features.

=== Facelifts ===
==== 2018 Japanese market facelift ====
The facelifted second-generation Sienta went on sale in Japan on 11 September 2018. The five-seater variant of the Sienta, called "Funbase", was added. The grille was mildly revised, with dashed motifs along with side chrome trimmings.

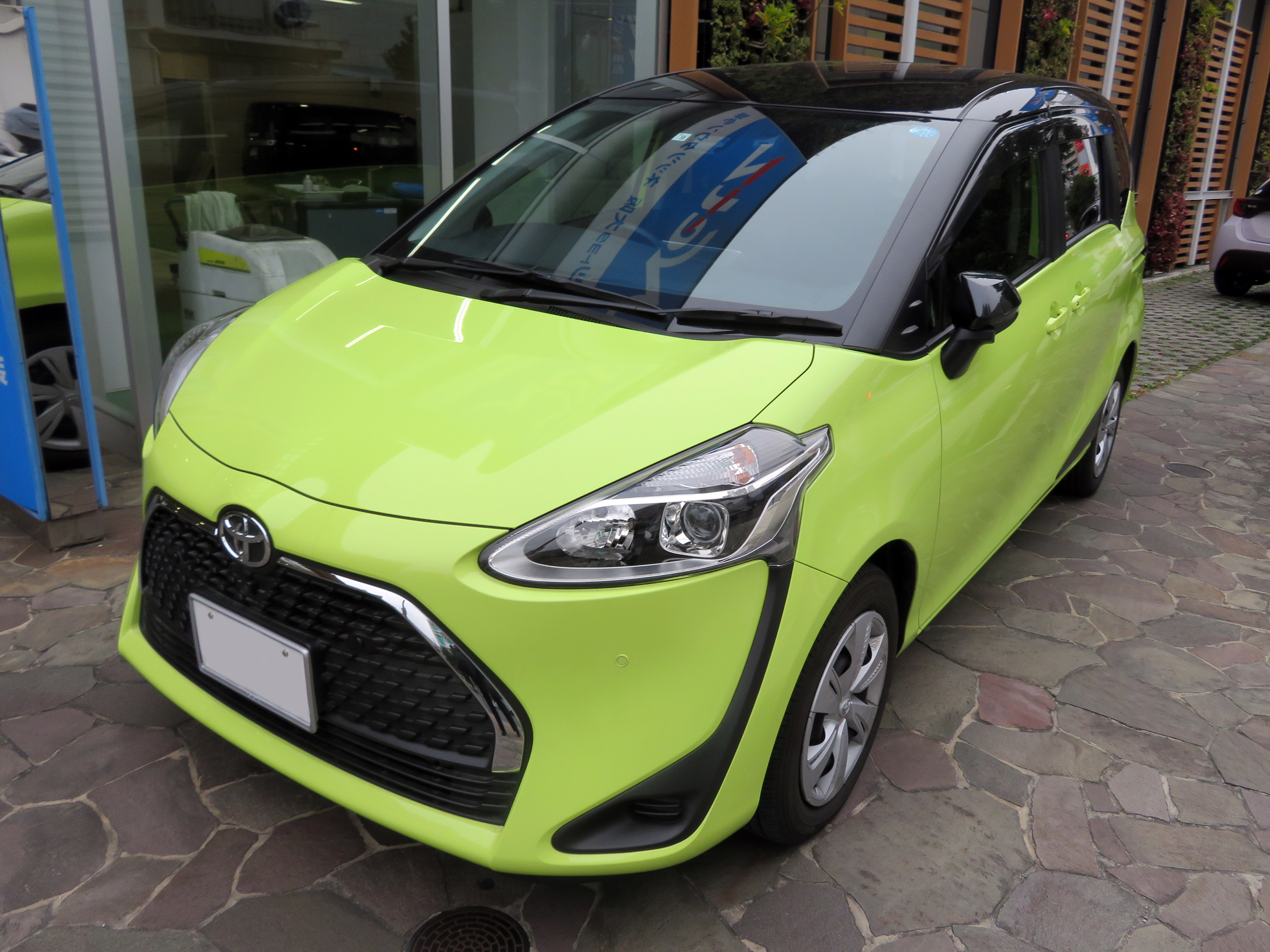
Sienta Funbase X (NSP170G; facelift, Japan)

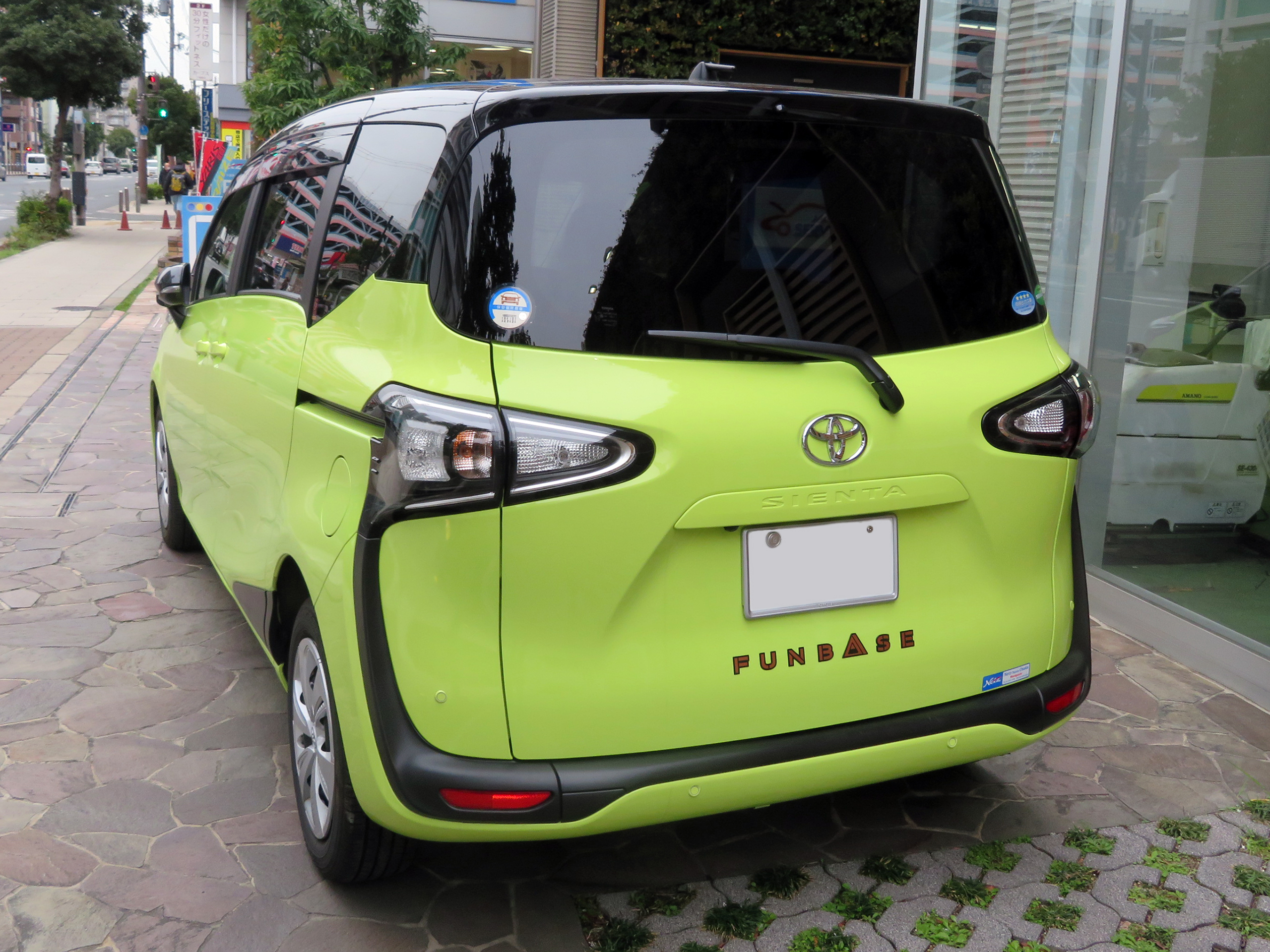
Sienta Funbase X (NSP170G; facelift, Japan)

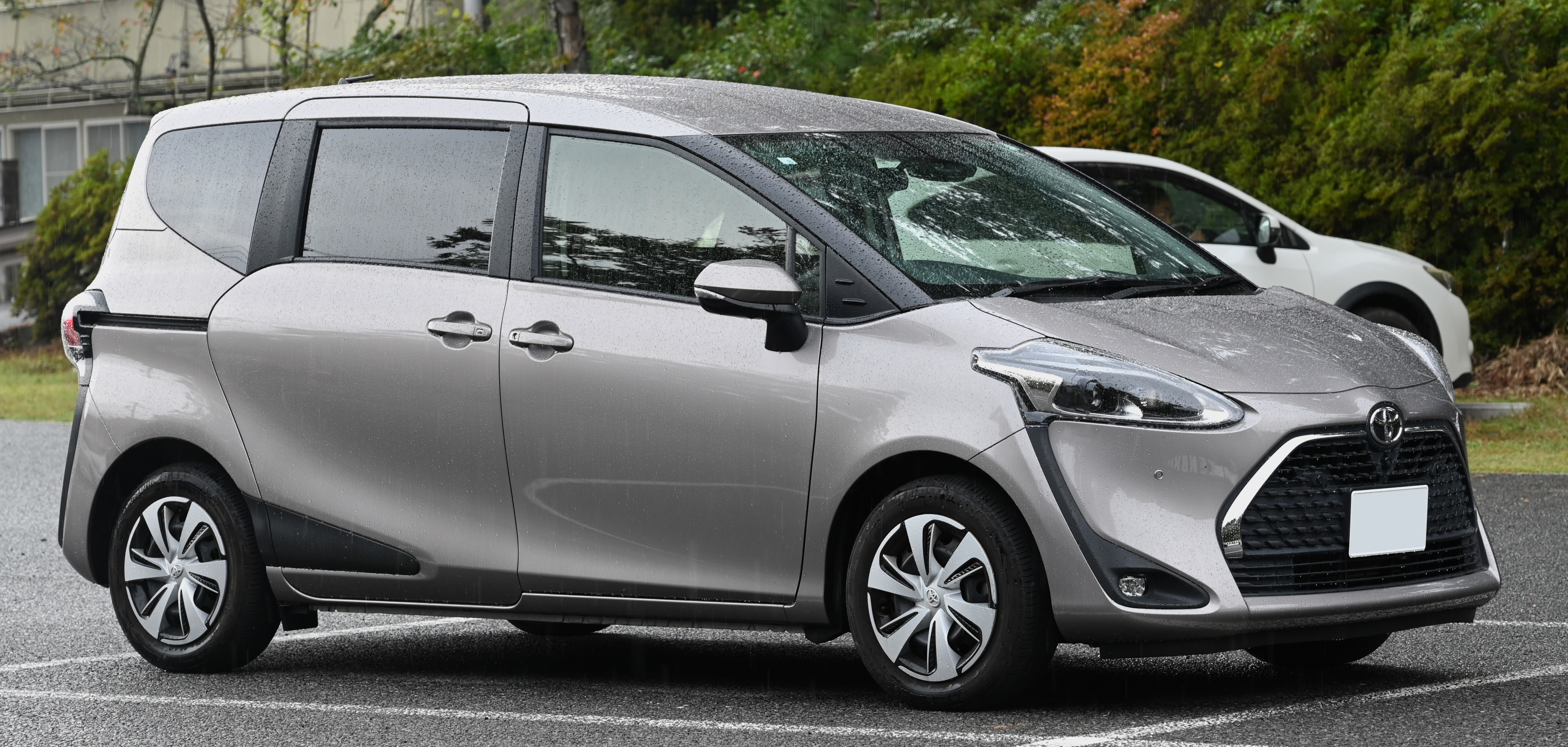
2018–2022 Sienta G Cuero (NSP170G; facelift, Japan)

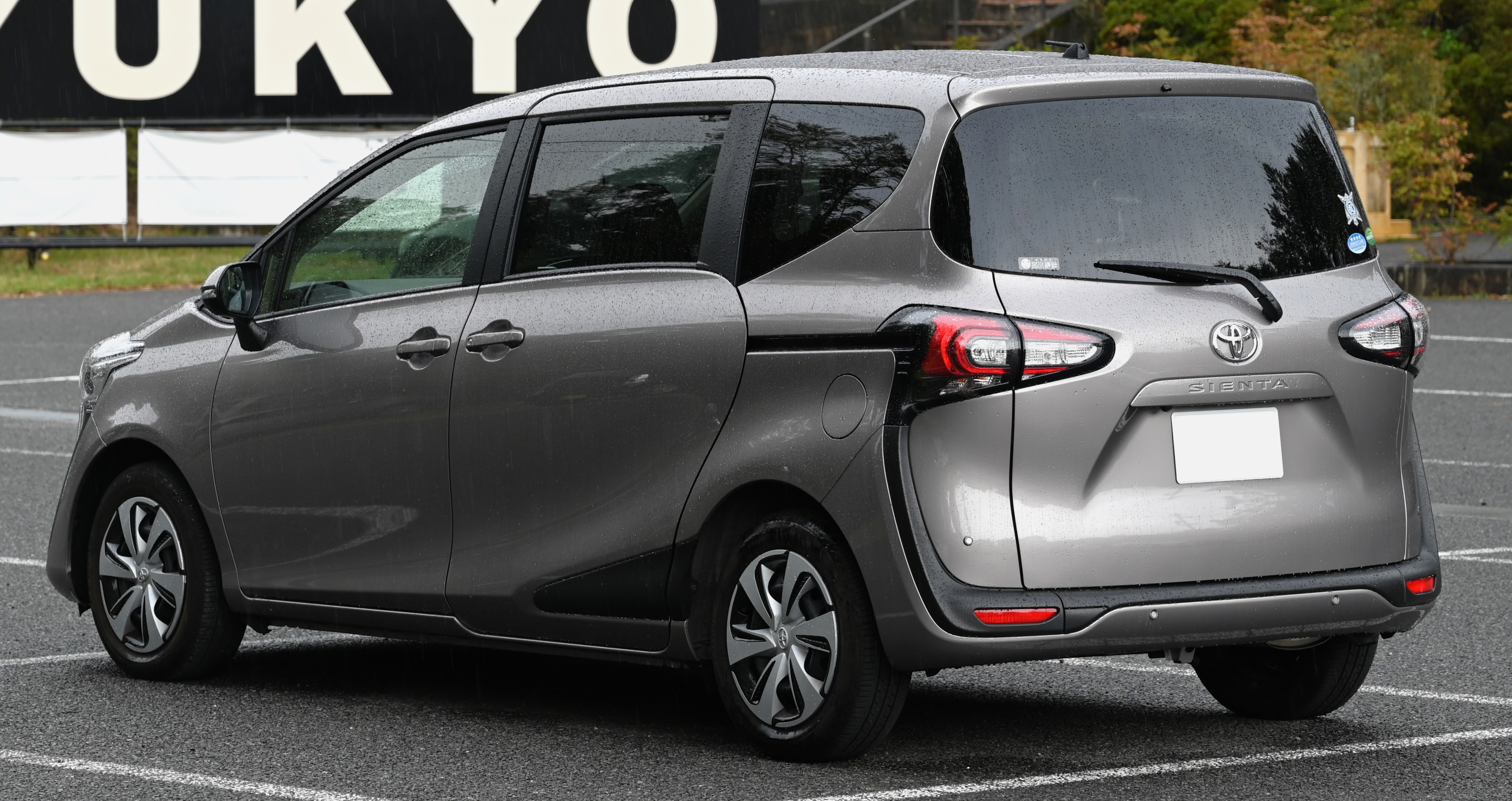
2018–2022 Sienta G Cuero (NSP170G; facelift, Japan)

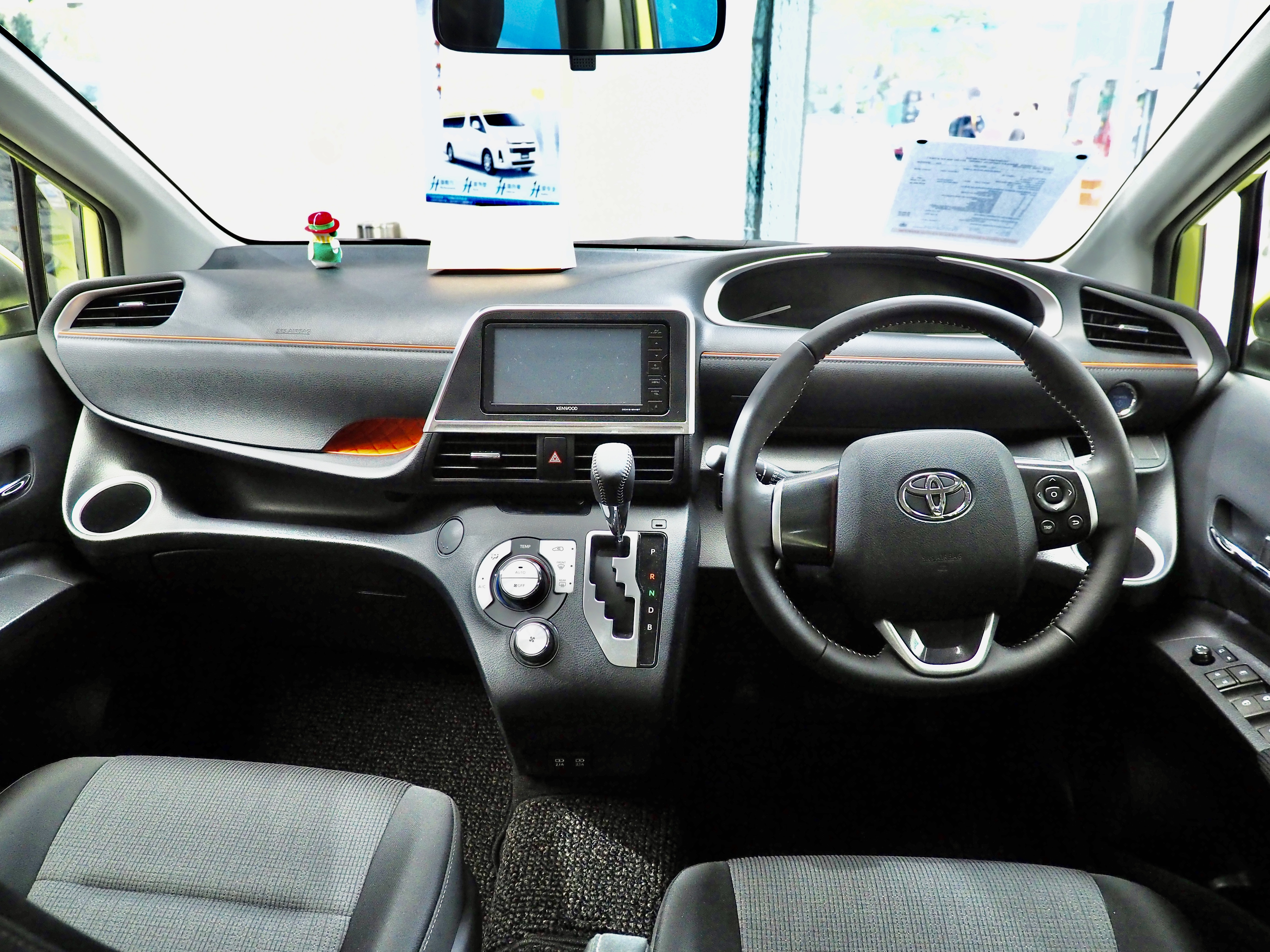
2018 Sienta Hybrid interior (facelift, Hong Kong)

==== 2019 Southeast Asian market facelift ====
The facelifted Southeast Asian market Sienta was launched in Thailand on 6 August 2019 and in Indonesia on 2 September 2019. Unlike the Japanese market facelift, the changes are only applied to the grille and some parts of the interior. Other changes include armrests for the driver and second-row passengers.

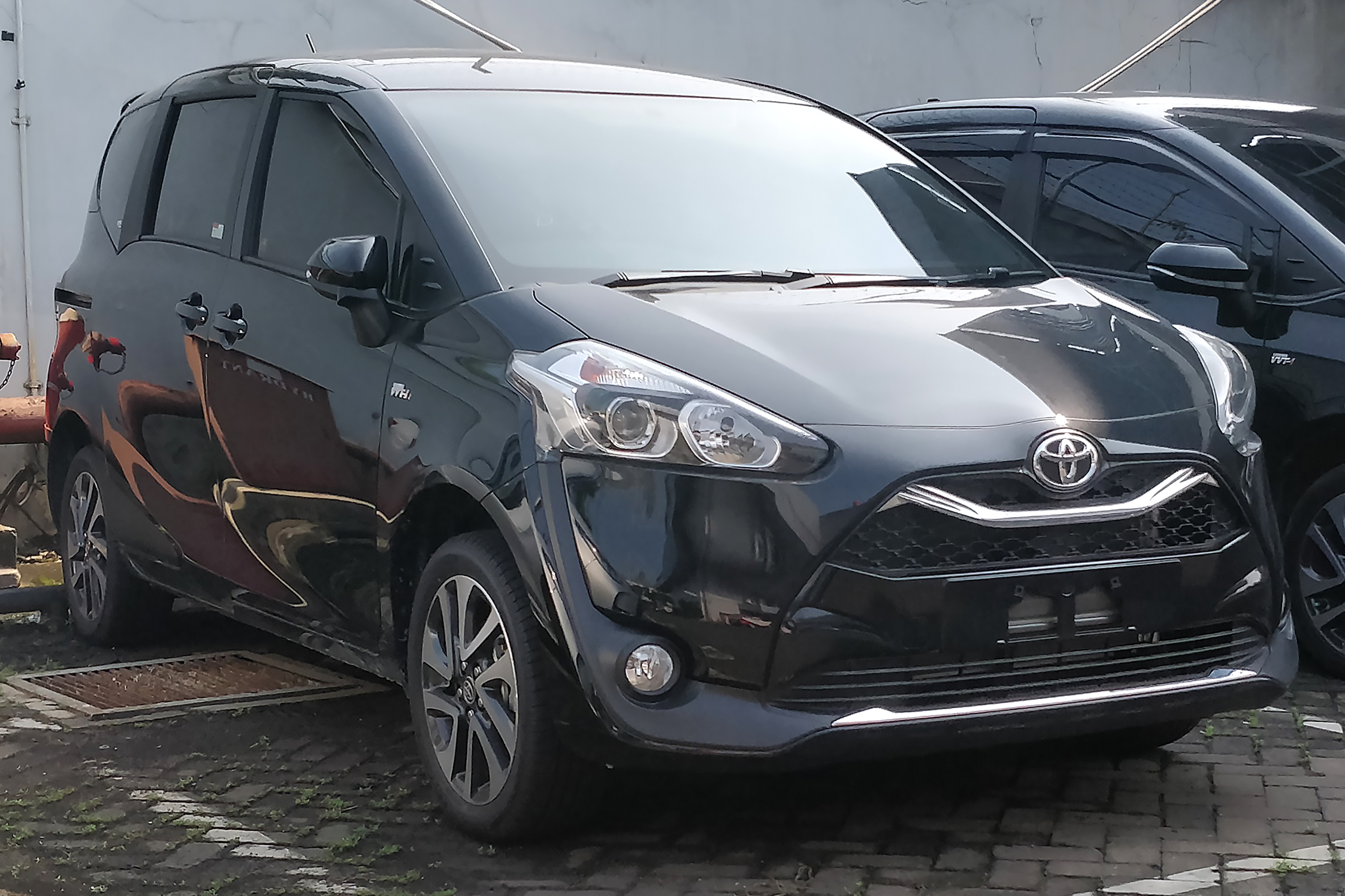
2021 Sienta 1.5 V (NSP170; facelift, Indonesia)

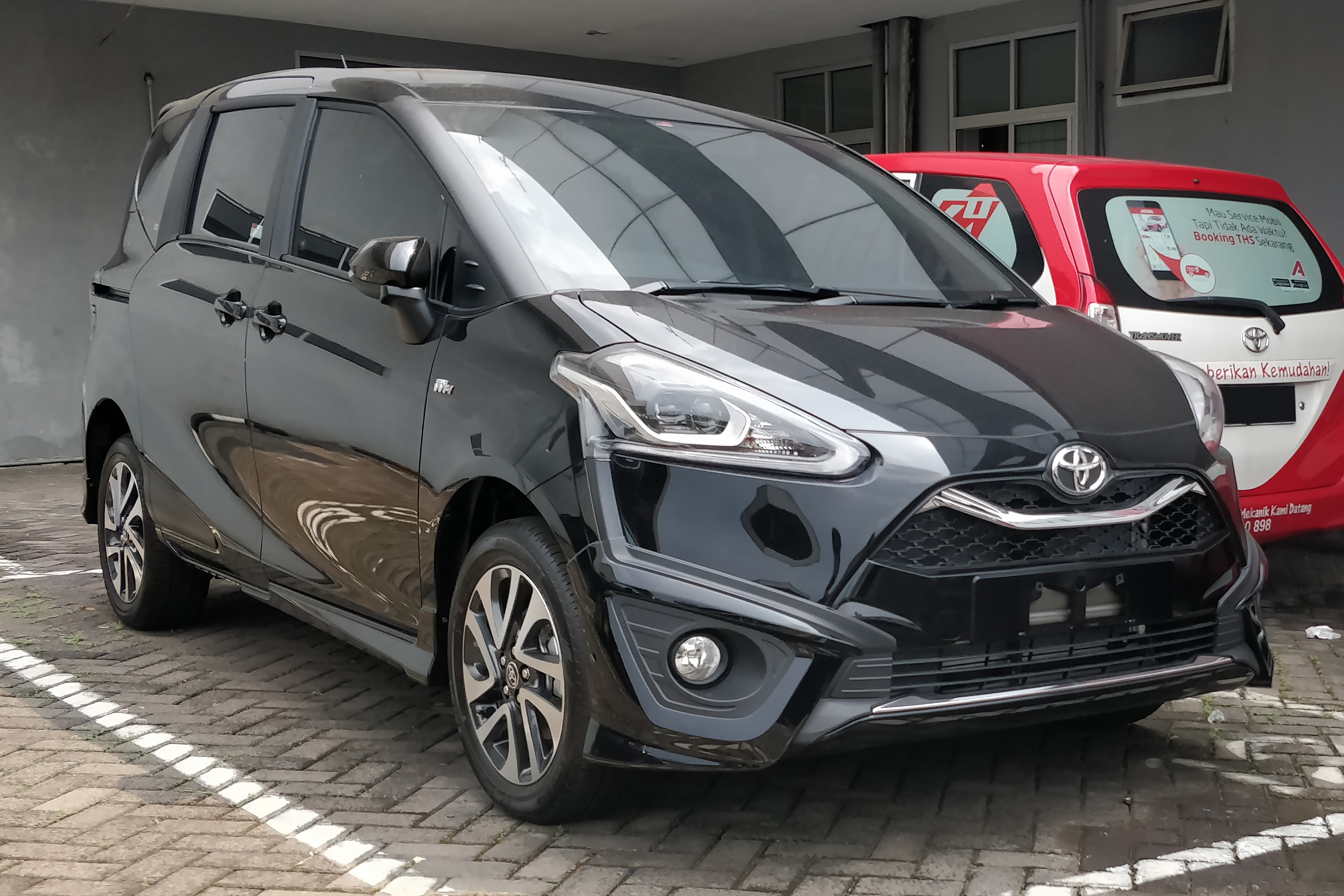
2021 Sienta 1.5 Q (NSP170; facelift, Indonesia)

=== Safety ===
ASEAN NCAP test results Toyota Sienta (2016)
Test	Points	Stars
Adult occupant:	15.26	4 /5 stars
Child occupant:	74%	4 /5 stars
Safety assist:	NA	

ASEAN NCAP test results Toyota Sienta (2016)
Test	Points	Stars
Adult occupant:	15.26	5 /5 stars
Child occupant:	74%	4 /5 stars
Safety assist:	NA	

TNCAP (1.0) test result Toyota Sienta 'Deluxe' (5-seater) (2024, similar to Euro NCAP 2017)
Test	Points	%
Overall:	4/5 stars	
Adult occupant:	30.017	78%
Child occupant:	34.124	69%
Pedestrian:	27.452	65%
Safety assist:	5.097	42%

== Third generation (XP210; 2022) ==
Third generation
- Sienta Hybrid Z (MXPC10G, Japan)

Overview
- Model code: XP210
- Production: July 2022 – present
- Assembly: Japan: Ōhira, Miyagi (TMEJ)
- Designer: Takaaki Katō (project chief designer); Junichi Tōra, Yoshikazu Shoji and Sakura Nakama (exterior); Ryota Fujishima, Masakazu Katsura and Kentaro Kurohara (interior)

Body and chassis
- Platform: TNGA: GA-B
- Related: Toyota Yaris (XP210); Toyota Aqua (XP210); Toyota Yaris Cross (XP210)

Powertrain
- Engine: Petrol: 1.5 L M15A-FKS I3 (MXPC10); Petrol hybrid: 1.5 L M15A-FXE I3 (MXPL10/15)
- Electric motor: 59 kW (79 hp; 80 PS) 1NM AC permanent-magnet synchronous (front, hybrid); 2.2 kW (3 hp; 3 PS) 1MM AC permanent-magnet synchronous (rear, hybrid)
- Transmission: K120 CVT with physical first gear; eCVT (hybrid)
- Hybrid drivetrain: Power-split (hybrid)
- Battery: 6.5 Ah nickel-metal hydride (hybrid)

Dimensions
- Wheelbase: 2,750 mm (108.3 in)
- Length: 4,260 mm (167.7 in)
- Width: 1,695 mm (66.7 in)
- Height: 1,695–1,715 mm (66.7–67.5 in)
- Kerb weight: 1,270–1,420 kg (2,800–3,131 lb)

The third-generation Sienta was launched in Japan on 23 August 2022. Built on the GA-B platform shared with the XP210 series Yaris, it is offered in X, G and Z grade levels. The Third-generation Sienta still maintains the types from the second generation, namely X and G, Meanwhile, the top variant which is parallel to the G Cuero has now been replaced with the Z grade. The Welcab remains available.

The Sienta was launched in Singapore on 6 October 2022. Is only offered in Hybrid Elegance grade level.

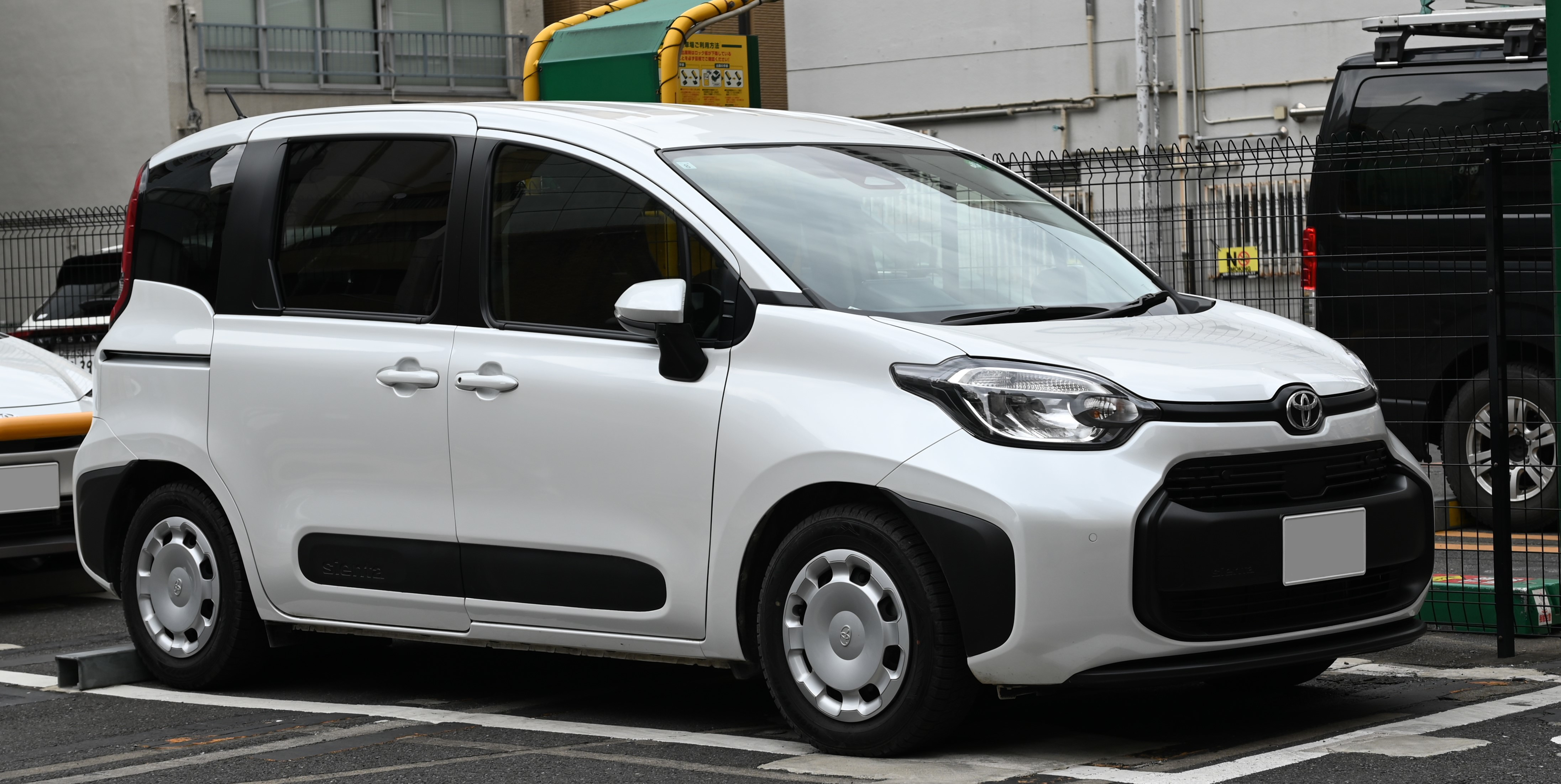
2023 Sienta G (MXPC10G, Japan)

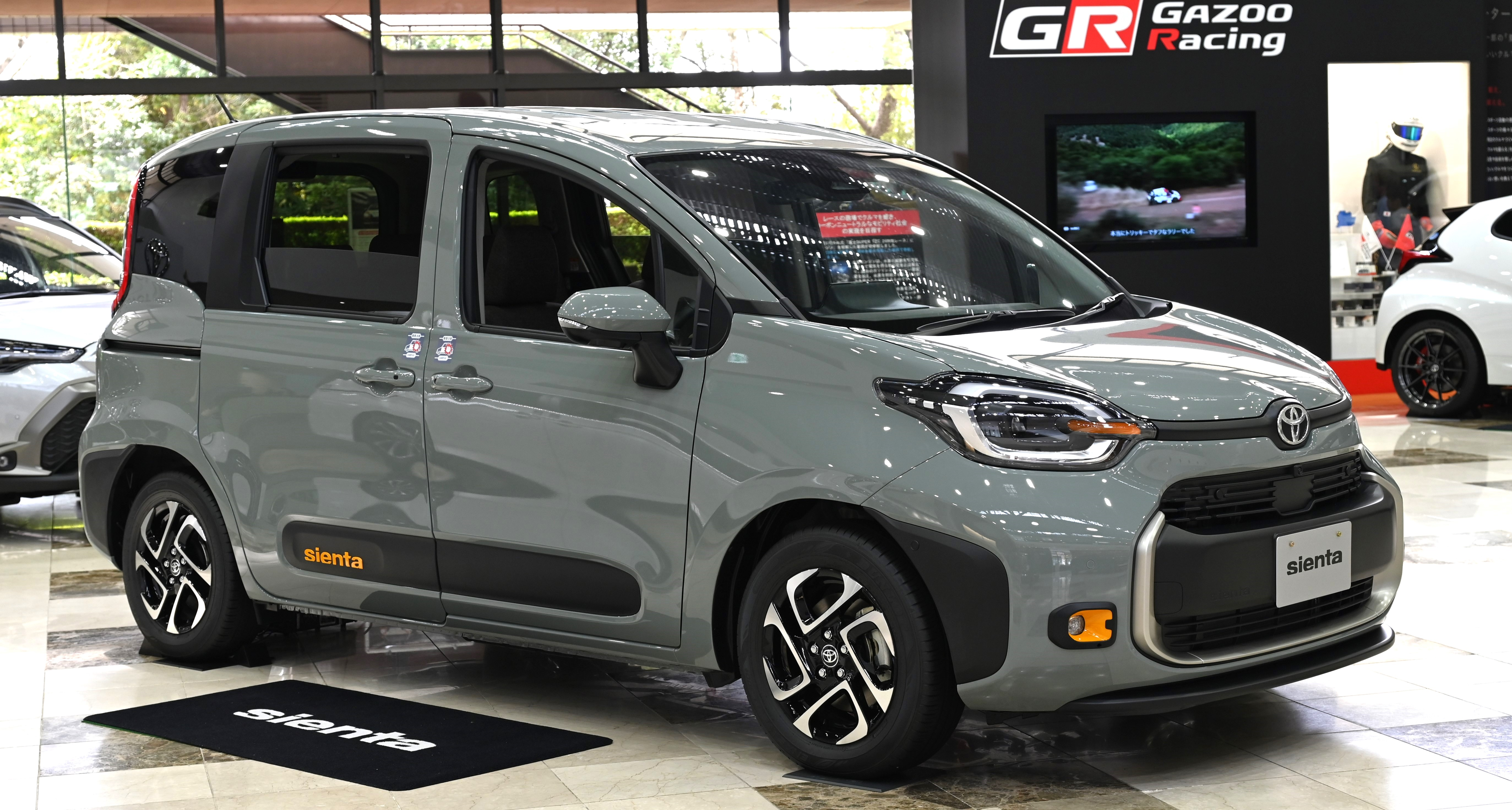
2022 Sienta Hybrid Z (with optional accessories)

Rear view

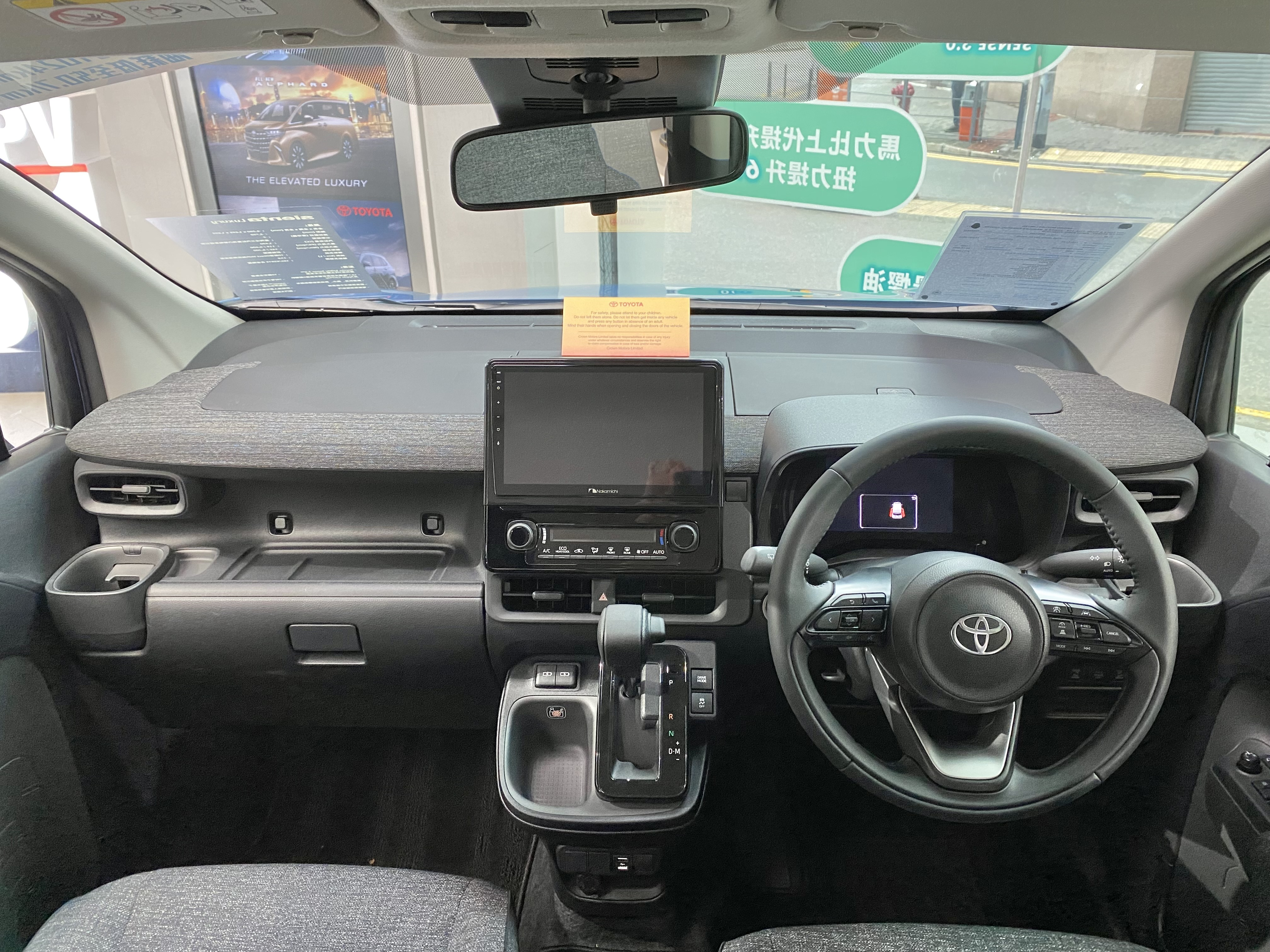
Interior

== Sales ==
Year	Japan	Taiwan	Indonesia	Thailand	Malaysia (Note: Figures based on registration (Malaysia))
2003	26,603				
2004	67,551				
2005	51,142				
2006	38,970				
2007	35,033				
2008	34,809				
2009	31,805				
2010	28,383				
2011	20,986				
2012	29,926				
2013	22,371				
2014	17,744				
2015	63,904				
2016	125,832	2,581	17,935	2,356	2,060
2017	96,847	14,577	15,835	6,426	2,203
2018	94,048	15,699	5,113	5,533	1,587
2019	110,880		1,030	4,531	265
2020	72,689	11,472	393		
2021	57,802		841		
2022	68,922		99		
2023	132,332				
2024	111,090				
