= Taiwan Electric Research and Testing Center =

Organization based in Guanyin, Taoyuan City, Taiwan

- 台灣大電力研究試驗中心
- Abbreviation: TERTEC
- Formation: April 1979
- Headquarters: Guanyin, Taoyuan City, Taiwan
- Website: Official website

The Taiwan Electric Research and Testing Center (TERTEC; traditional Chinese: 台灣大電力研究試驗中心; simplified Chinese: 台湾大电力研究试验中心; pinyin: Táiwān Dà Diànlì Yánjiū Shìyàn Zhōngxīn) is a laboratory in Guanyin District, Taoyuan City, Taiwan.

== History ==
In 1978, the Executive Yuan decided to set up a testing laboratory for high voltage and high power equipment. Taiwan Power Company and 13 other local companies then jointly established the Taiwan Electric Research and Testing Center in April 1979. In December 1998, the headquarters was relocated to Taiwan Technology headquarters building in Xindian City, Taipei County. In May 2003, the headquarters was moved again to its current location in Guanyin Township, Taoyuan County.
