= Baishajia Lighthouse =

Lighthouse in Guanyin, Taoyuan City, Taiwan

Baishajia Lighthouse Paisha Chia 白沙岬燈塔
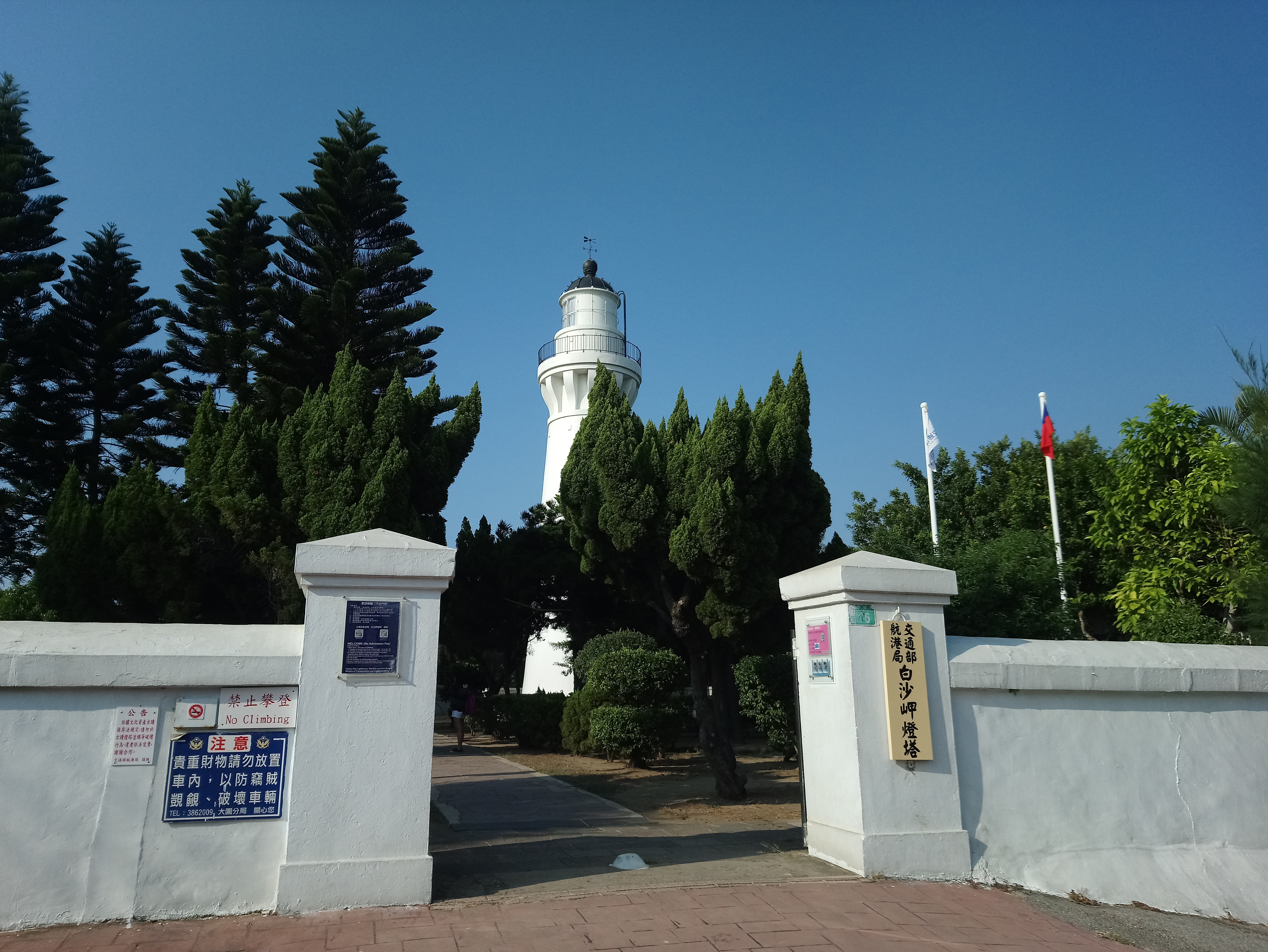
- Location: Taoyuan; Guanyin District; Taiwan
- Coordinates: 25°02′28.8″N 121°04′34.4″E

Tower
- Constructed: 1902
- Construction: brick stone tower
- Height: 27.7 metres (91 ft)
- Shape: cylindrical tower with balcony and lantern
- Markings: white tower, black lantern dome
- Operator: Maritime and Port Bureau

Light
- Focal height: 36.6 metres (120 ft)
- Lens: original 3rd order Fresnel lens
- Range: white: 25.7 nautical miles (47.6 km; 29.6 mi) red: 22.6 nautical miles (41.9 km; 26.0 mi)
- Characteristic: Al WR 10s.

The Baishajia Lighthouse or Paisha Chia Lighthouse (traditional Chinese: 白沙岬燈塔; simplified Chinese: 白沙岬灯塔; pinyin: Báishājiǎ Dēngtǎ) is a lighthouse in Guanyin District, Taoyuan City, Taiwan.

== History ==
The lighthouse was established in 1901 as the third lighthouse built in Taiwan under Japanese rule with an original height of 38 meters. However, the upper portion was destroyed during World War II. After the war, the tower was repaired to its current height. In March 2013, it was announced that the lighthouse would be opened for tourists starting September 2013.

== Architecture ==
The lighthouse is a white round brick structure stands at 27.7 meters in height. The focal plane flashes every 10 seconds.

== Opening time ==
The lighthouse is opened from Tuesday to Sunday from 9.00 a.m. to 5.00 p.m. or 6.00 p.m.

== See also ==
- List of tourist attractions in Taiwan
- List of lighthouses in Taiwan
