= Guanyin District =

District in Taoyuan City, Taiwan

Guanyin 觀音區
- District
- Guanyin District
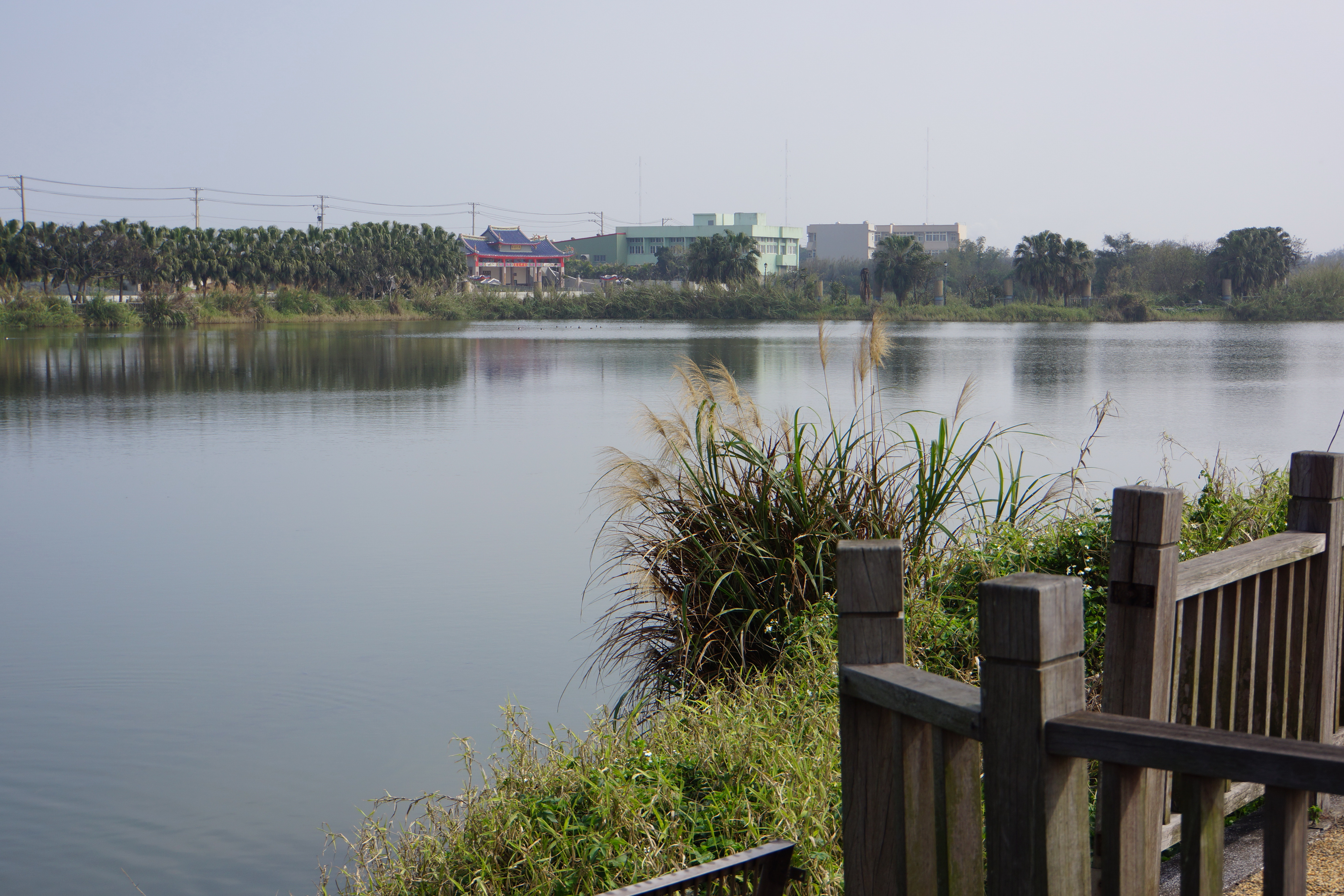
- Guanyin Pond

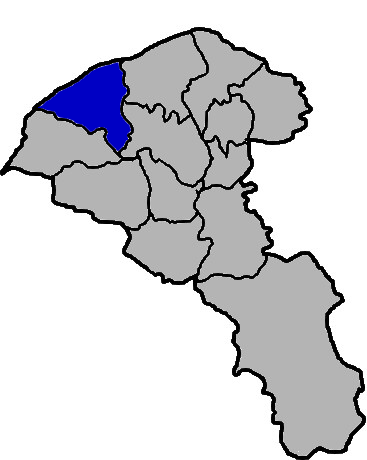
- Coordinates: 25°02′N 121°06′E
- Country: Taiwan
- Region: Northern Taiwan

Government
  - Mayor: Ou Bingchen

Area
  - Total: 87.9807 km^{2} (33.9695 sq mi)

Population (February 2023)
  - Total: 73,299
  - Density: 833.13/km^{2} (2,157.8/sq mi)
- Website: www.guanyin.tycg.gov.tw (in Chinese)

Guanyin District (Chinese: 觀音區; pinyin: Guānyīn Qū) is a rural, coastal district in western Taoyuan City, Taiwan. Guanyin is the name of a Buddhist boddhisattva.

== History ==
Guanyin was originally named as Shiguanyin during the Qing Dynasty rule. It was renamed to Guanyin in 1920 during the Japanese rule. After the handover of Taiwan from Japan to the Republic of China in 1945, Guanyin was reestablished as a township of Taoyuan County. On 25 December 2014, it was upgraded to a district named Guanyin District of Taoyuan City.

== Geography ==
- Area: 87.98 km^{2}
- Population: 73,299 people (February 2023)

Guanyin is part of the alluvial fan in Taoyuan City. The coastline is about 15 km at the northern side.

== Administrative divisions ==
Guanyin, Baiyu, Guangxing, Datan, Baosheng, Wuwei, Sanhe, Xinxing, Kengwei, Jinhu, Lanpu, Datong, Daku, Lunping, Fuyuan, Shangda, Xinpo, Guangfu, Tajiao, Baozhang, Caota, Caoxin, Shulin and Fulin Village.

== Infrastructure ==
- Taiwan Electric Research and Testing Center
- Tatan Power Plant

== Tourist attractions ==
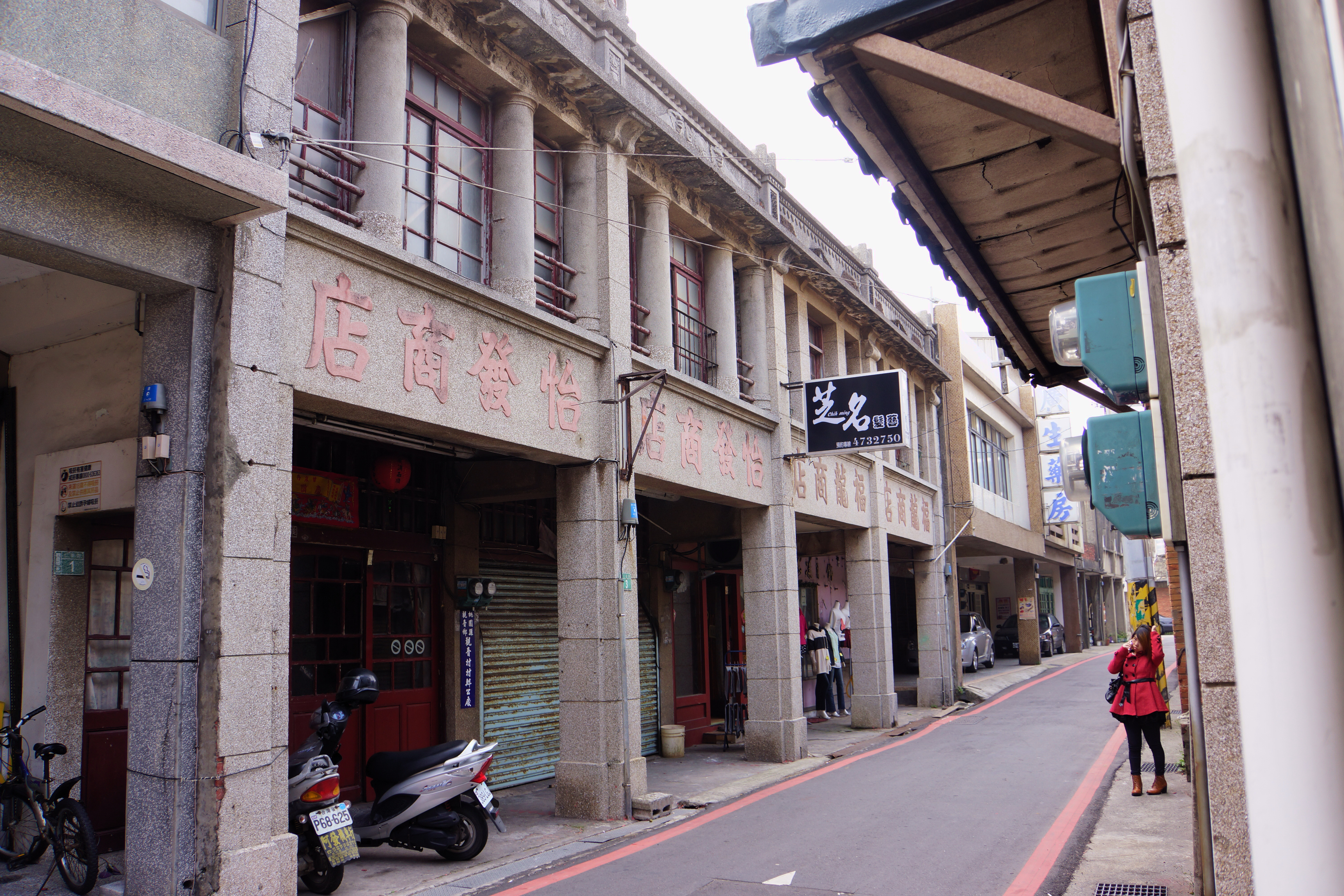
Old town of Guanyin District

- Baishajia Lighthouse
- 1213 Baosheng Inn
- Datian Lotus Farm
- Golden Lake Shore
- Kangzhuang Lotus Garden
- Lin's Old Style House
- Longman Bottle Gourd
- Lotus Garden
- Monet's Garden
- Qinglin Farm
- Sanqi Bee Park
- Sun and Green Farm
- Wu Cuo Yang Jia Zhuang
- Xianghao Leisure Farm
- Yifeng Leisure Farm
- Yuanyin Farm

== Transportation ==
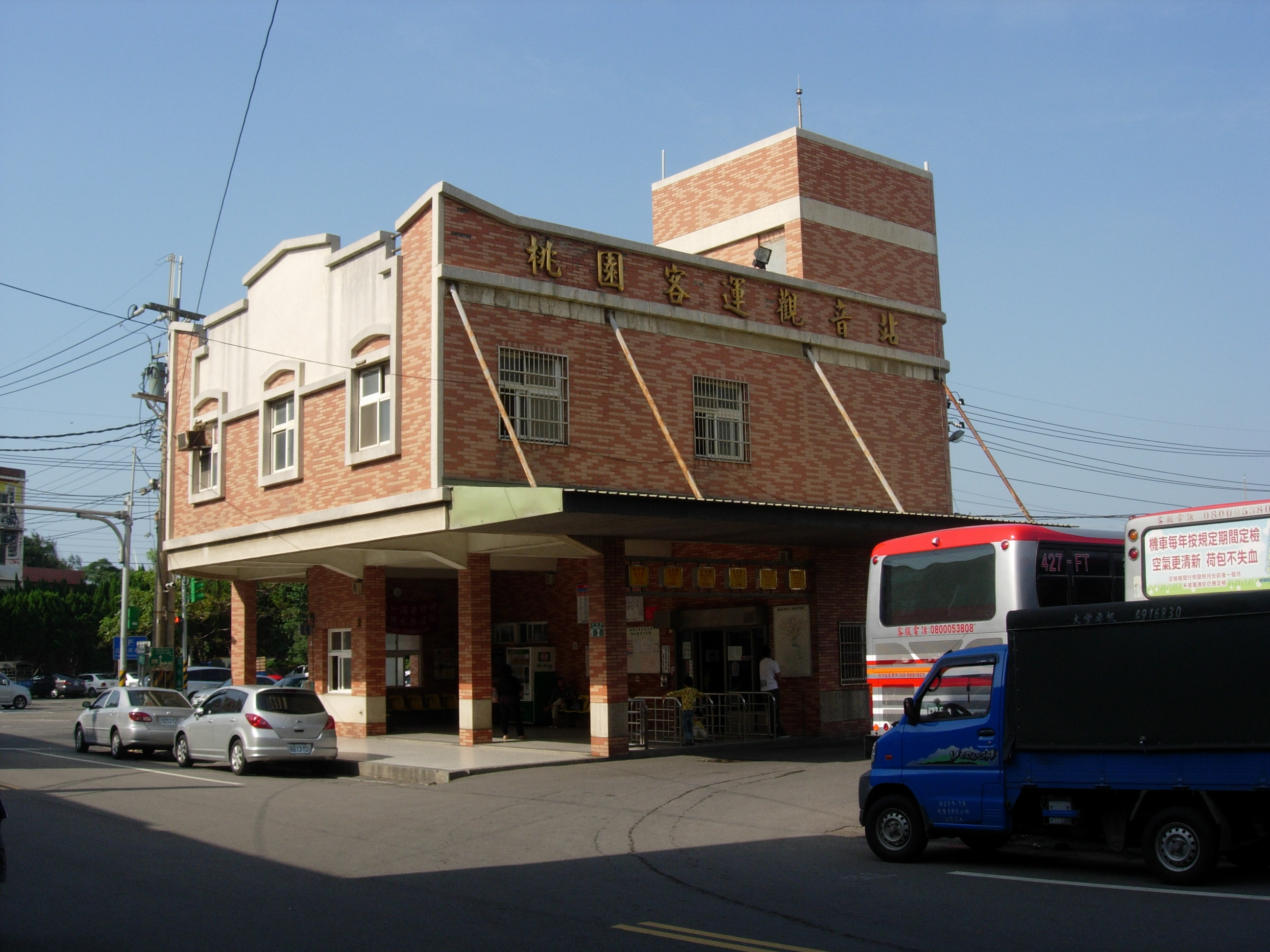
Guanyin Bus Station

Guanyin District is served by Taoyuan Bus.

== See also ==
- Taoyuan City
