= Toyota Corolla (E140) =

Tenth generation of Toyota Corolla

Toyota Corolla (E140/E150)
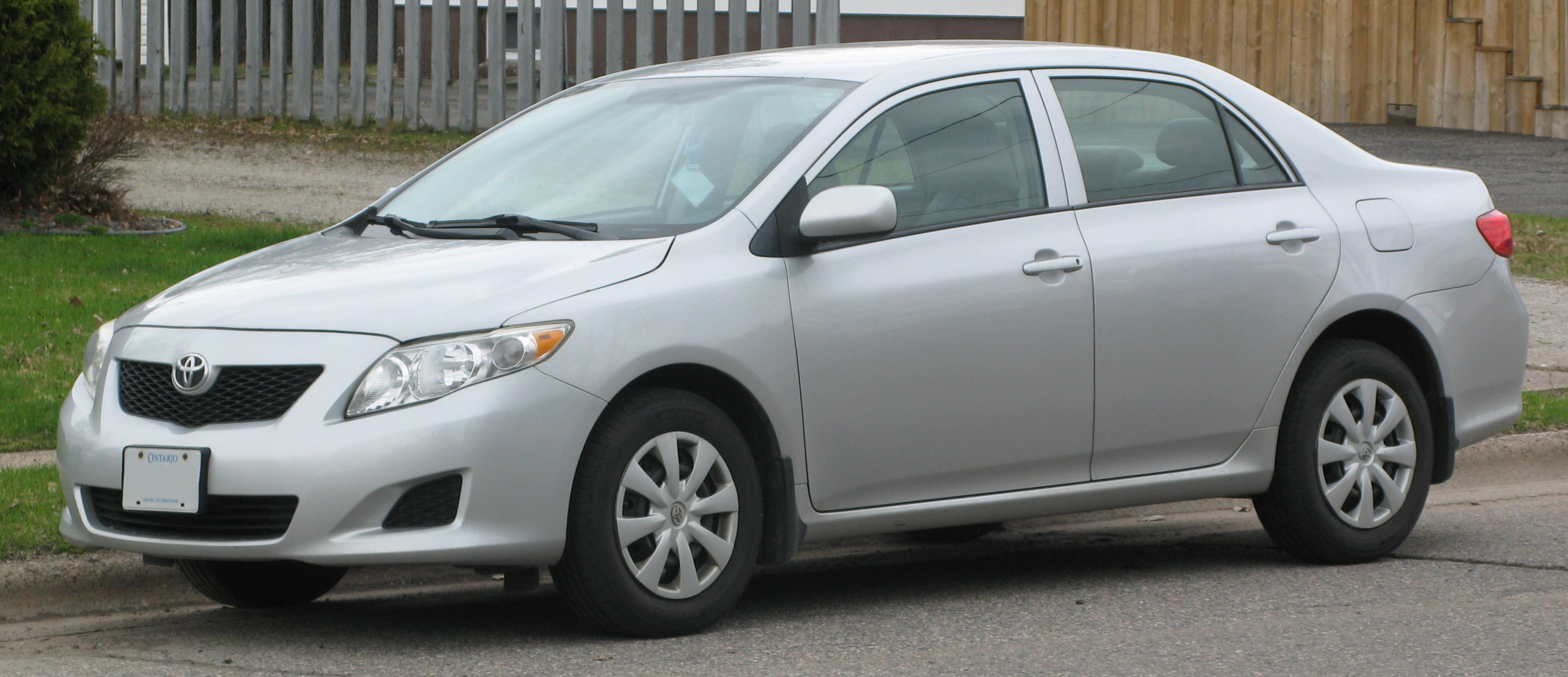
- Toyota Corolla (E140/E150, international version)

Overview
- Manufacturer: Toyota
- Production: October 2006 – May 2012 (Japan); November 2006 – December 2013 (International); August 2007 – January 2020 (South Africa); November 2007 – July 2013 (North America); March 2008 – January 2014 (Southeast Asia)
- Model years: 2009–2013
- Assembly: Japan: Toyota, Aichi (Takaoka plant, Corolla Axio); Susono, Shizuoka (Higashi Fuji plant, Corolla Fielder, export models); Brazil: Indaiatuba; Canada: Cambridge, Ontario (TMMC); China: Tianjin (FAW Toyota); India: Bidadi (Toyota India); Pakistan: Karachi (Toyota Indus); South Africa: Prospecton (TSAM); Taiwan: Zhongli; Taoyuan; Thailand: Chachoengsao; United States: Fremont, California (NUMMI, 2006–2010); Blue Springs, Mississippi (TMMMS, after 2011); Venezuela: Cumaná; Vietnam: Vĩnh Phúc
- Designer: Soichiro Okudaira and Hiroya Fujita (Japanese version, 2004); Masaki Okue and Tatsuya Sonoda (international version, 2004); Tatsurou Koshino and Tetsuya Nakagawa (facelift, international version, 2008)

Body and chassis
- Body style: 4-door saloon/sedan; 5-door estate/station wagon (Fielder)
- Layout: Front-mid-engine, front-wheel-drive; Front-engine, four-wheel-drive
- Platform: Toyota MC platform (E140); Toyota New MC platform (E150)
- Related: Toyota Matrix (E140); Toyota Auris (E150); Scion xB/Toyota Corolla Rumion; Pontiac Vibe

Powertrain
- Engine: Petrol: 1.3 L 2NZ-FE VVT-i I4; 1.4 L 4ZZ-FE VVT-i I4; 1.5 L 1NZ-FE VVT-i I4; 1.5 L 1NZ-FE Turbo VVT-i I4; 1.6 L 3ZZ-FE VVT-i I4; 1.6 L 1ZR-FE Dual VVT-i I4; 1.8 L 1ZZ-FE VVT-i I4; 1.8 L 2ZR-FE Dual VVT-i I4; 1.8 L 2ZR-FBE Dual VVT-i (E85/petrol; Thailand); 2.0 L 3ZR-FE Dual VVT-i I4; 2.4 L 2AZ-FE VVT-i I4; Diesel: 1.4 L 1ND-TV D-4D turbo I4; 2.0 L 2C-III I4; 2.0 L 1CD-FTV D-4D turbo I4
- Transmission: 5-speed manual; 6-speed manual; 7-speed CVT-i; 4-speed U140E Super ECT automatic; 5-speed U150E automatic; 6-speed MMT (Multi Mode Transmission) semi-automatic

Dimensions
- Wheelbase: 2,600 mm (102.4 in)
- Length: Japan: 4,410 mm (173.6 in); International; saloon, 2008–10: 4,540 mm (178.7 in); International; saloon, 2011–13: 4,554–4,572 mm (179.3–180.0 in); Estate: 4,420 mm (174.0 in)
- Width: Japan: 1,695 mm (66.7 in); International: 1,760 mm (69.3 in)
- Height: Saloon: 1,465 mm (57.7 in); Estate: 1,515 mm (59.6 in)
- Curb weight: 1,130–1,240 kg (2,491–2,734 lb) (narrow body, Japan); 1,170–1,180 kg (2,579–2,601 lb) (Estate, Japan); 1,195–1,255 kg (2,635–2,767 lb) (wide body, international)

Chronology
- Predecessor: Toyota Corolla (E120/E130)
- Successor: Japan: Toyota Corolla (E160); International: Toyota Corolla (E170/E180)

The Toyota Corolla (E140/E150) is the tenth generation of cars marketed by Toyota under the Corolla nameplate. The Toyota Auris replaced the Corolla hatchback in Japan and Europe, but remained badged as a "Corolla" in Australia and New Zealand.

The chassis of the E140 is based on the Toyota MC platform, with the E150 model deriving from the New MC platform. The Japanese market E140 carried its MC platform over from the previous E120, using a narrow body for its chassis. The versions sold in the Americas, Southeast Asia and the Middle East are based on the widened body of this platform. Models sold in Australia, Europe and South Africa used the more sophisticated New MC underpinnings, and were designated as E150. The wide-body E150 was first released in China and Europe in early 2007, while the wide-body E140 was released in Americas and parts of Asia later in the year.

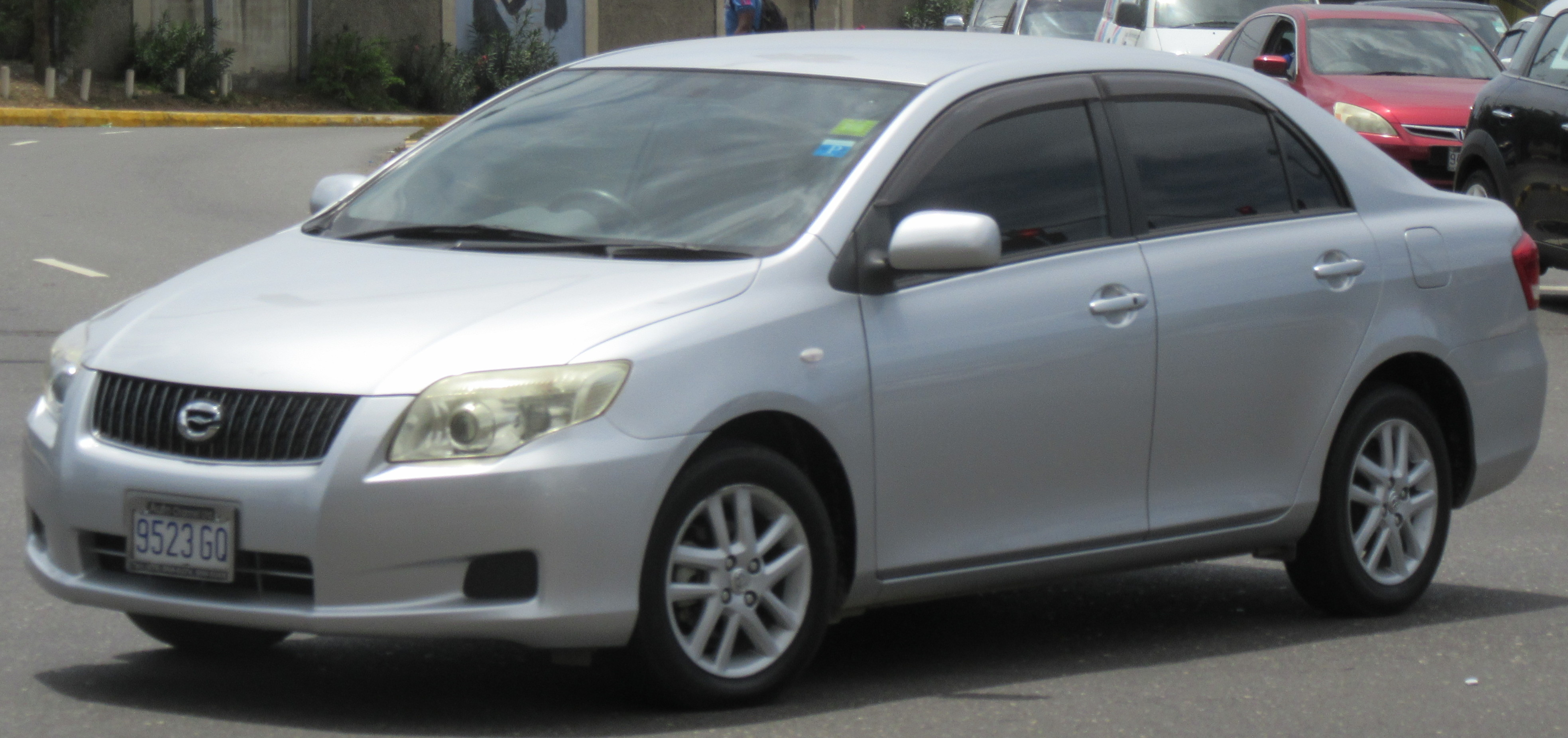
E140 (narrow-body)

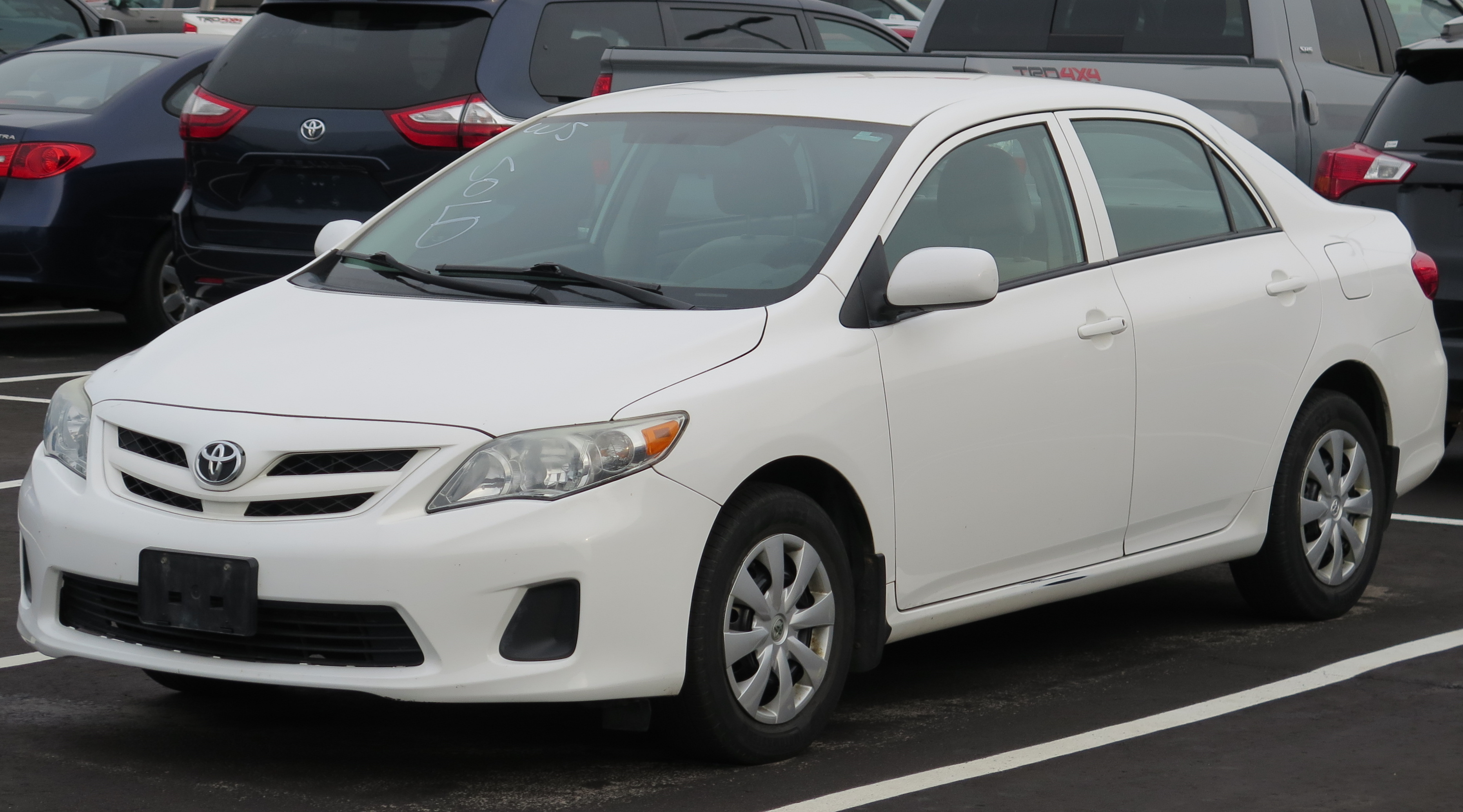
E140 (wide-body)

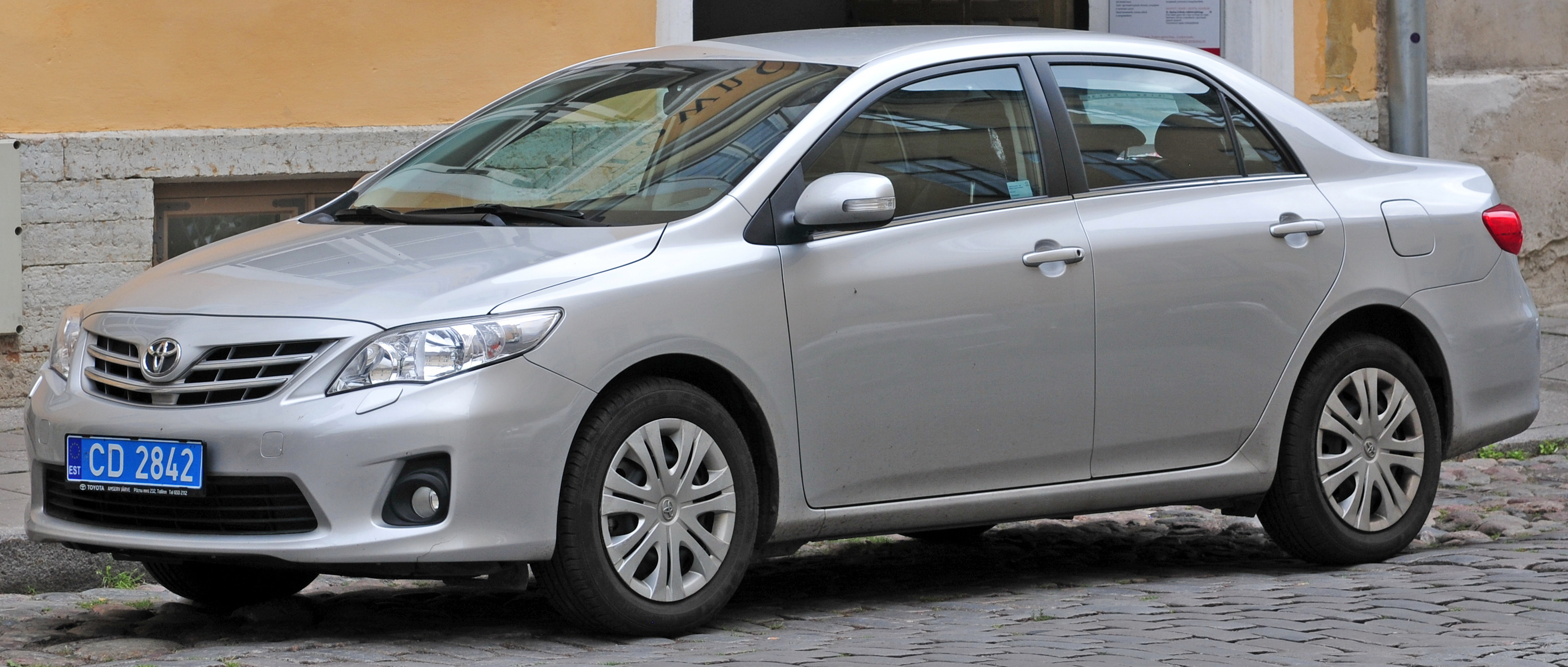
E150 (wide-body; saloon)

== E140 narrow-body ==
=== Japan ===
The tenth-generation Corolla (E140) was released in Japan on 10 October 2006. The saloon is now known as the Corolla Axio. The Axio name was created from the Greek word "Axia", meaning "things with value". The estate version retains the Corolla Fielder name. The dimensions for the Corolla sold in Japan are smaller than vehicles made for export so as to remain in compliance with Japanese government regulations concerning exterior dimensions and engine displacement.

The Corolla Axio gets Toyota's latest intelligent parking-assist system. The option costs ¥105,000, or US$879 at current exchange rates. A backup camera monitor is standard. On Japanese models only, G-BOOK, a subscription telematics service, is offered as an option. The Luxel being the highest trim level, offers additional features such as Dynamic radar Cruise Control and tiptronic transmission. The G mid range model receives a set of projector headlamps, factory-fitted audio system with steering audio controls, Push button start, speedometer clusters with additional tachometer clusters and automatic climate controls.

The Japanese model included a rear-view monitor which displays an image of the area at the rear of the vehicle while backing up to reduce the burden on the driver while parking. The optional Intelligent Parking Assist system also supports steering operations when parallel parking and backing into a parking space. Ultrasonic sensors installed on the front detect parked vehicles and, based on the results, estimate the physical dimensions of a vacant parking space and set the target parking position.

The Corolla Axio introduced a Pre-Crash Safety System that uses millimetre-wave radar. When this radar detects a high risk of collision, the Pre-Crash Seatbelts improve initial restraint for passengers while the Pre-Crash Brake Assist System decelerates to reduce the collision speed and contribute to less damage induced by collision. The Radar Cruise Control system detects and monitors the preceding vehicle and the lane, maintaining a fixed distance according to the preceding vehicle's speed within a preset range of speed.

Both the Corolla Axio and Corolla Fielder received their facelift on 28 October 2008. The Corolla Axio only received a redesigned front grille and rear lights, while the Corolla Fielder also received a redesigned front bumper.

In 2011, a total of 70,758 Corolla Axios were sold in Japan.

Pre-facelift styling (2006–2008)

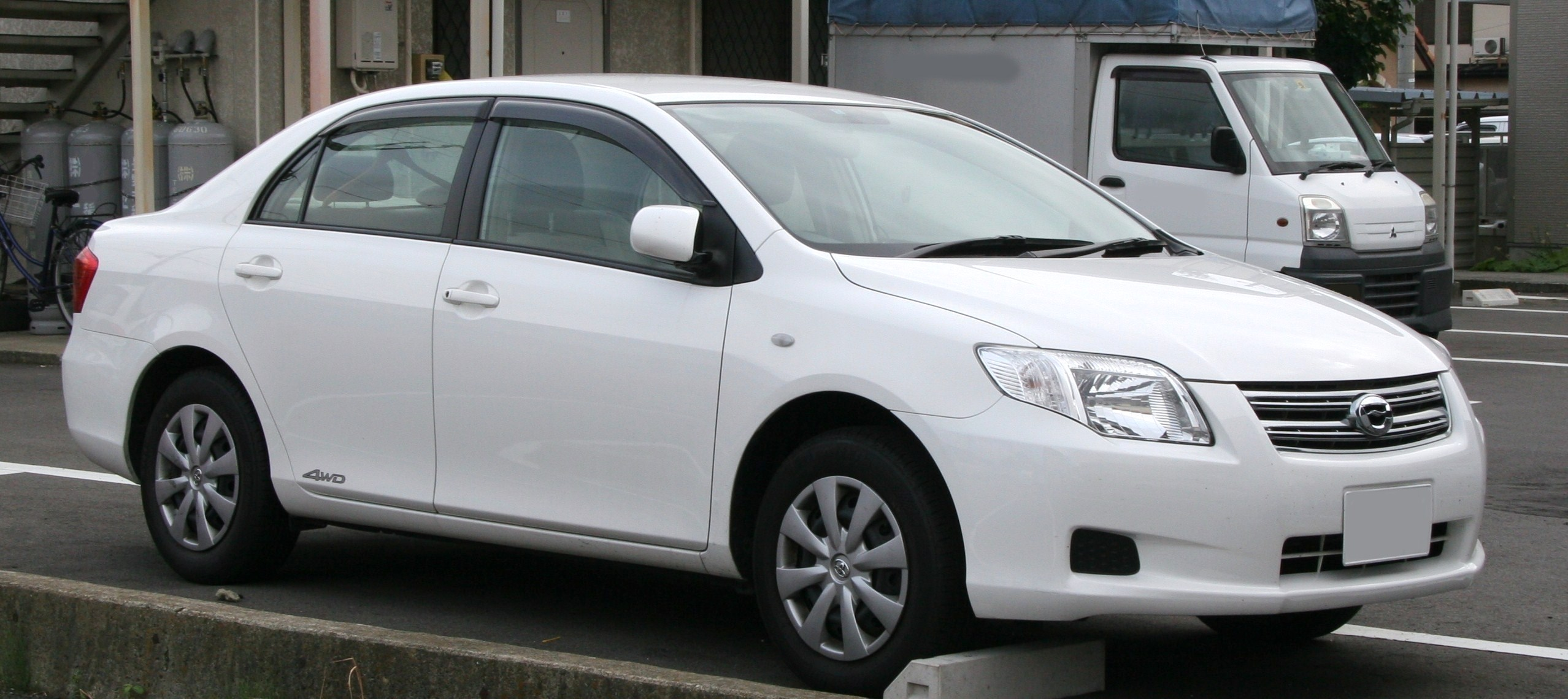
Corolla Axio (Japan; pre-facelift)

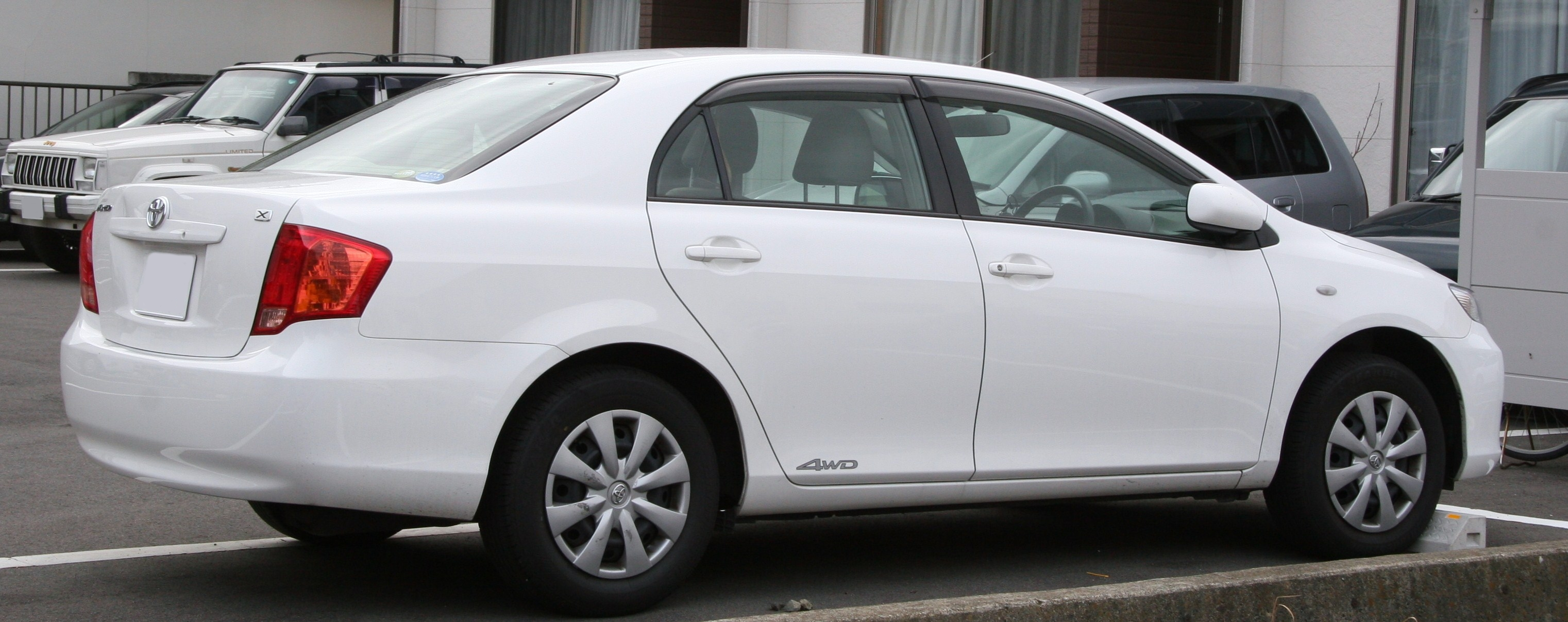
Corolla Axio (Japan; pre-facelift)

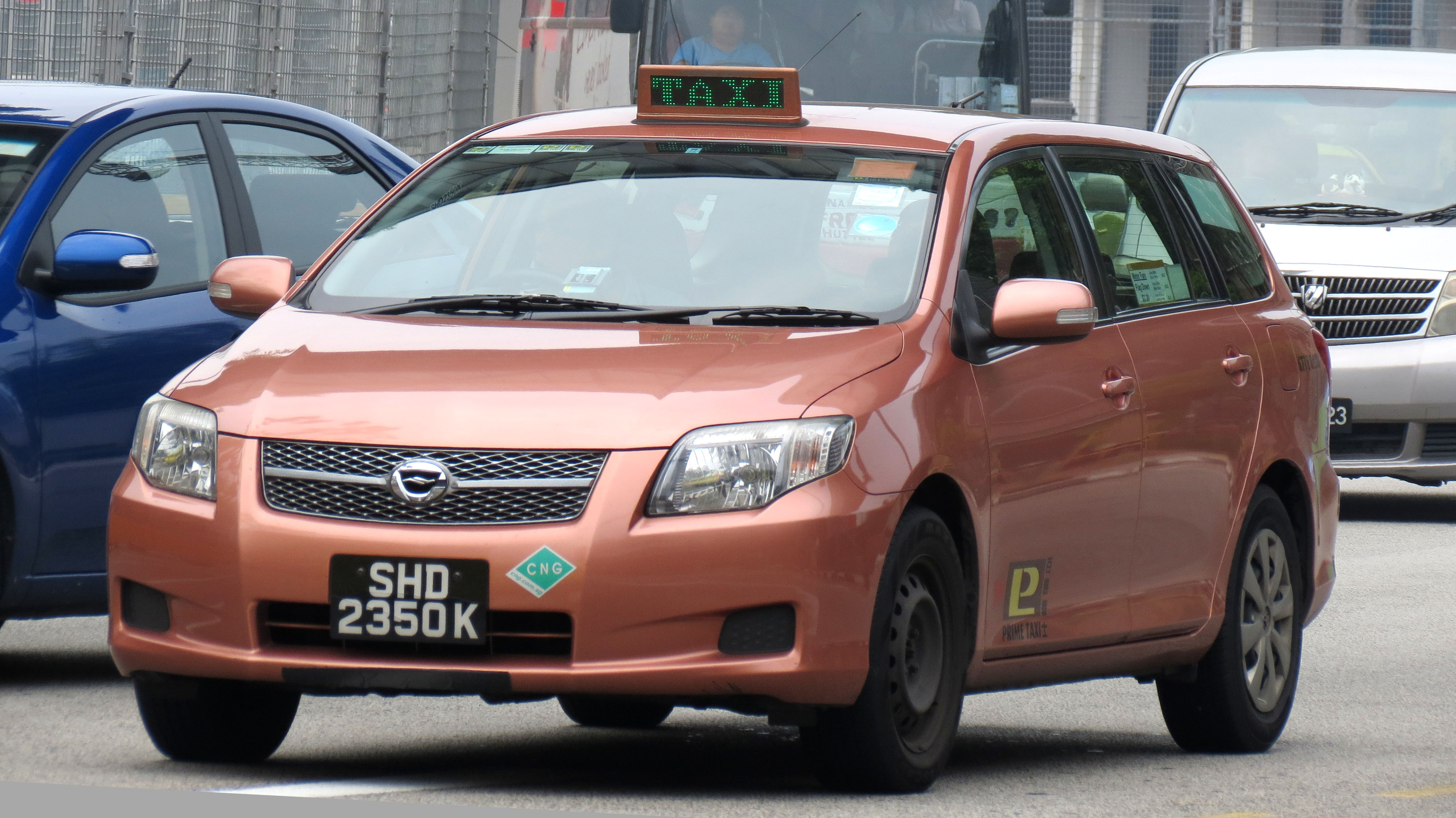
Corolla Fielder (Singapore; pre-facelift)

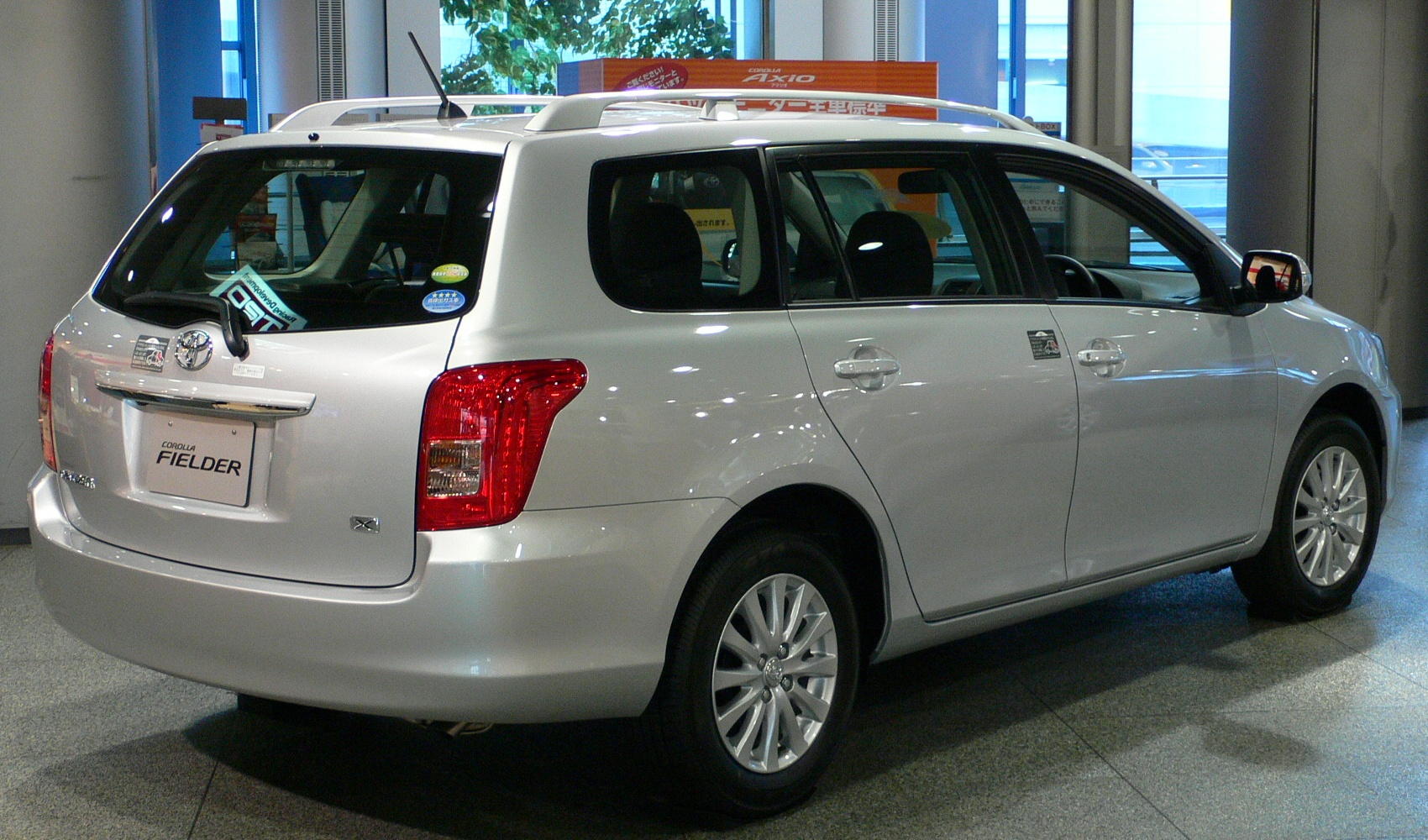
Corolla Fielder (Japan; pre-facelift)

Post-facelift styling (2008–2012)

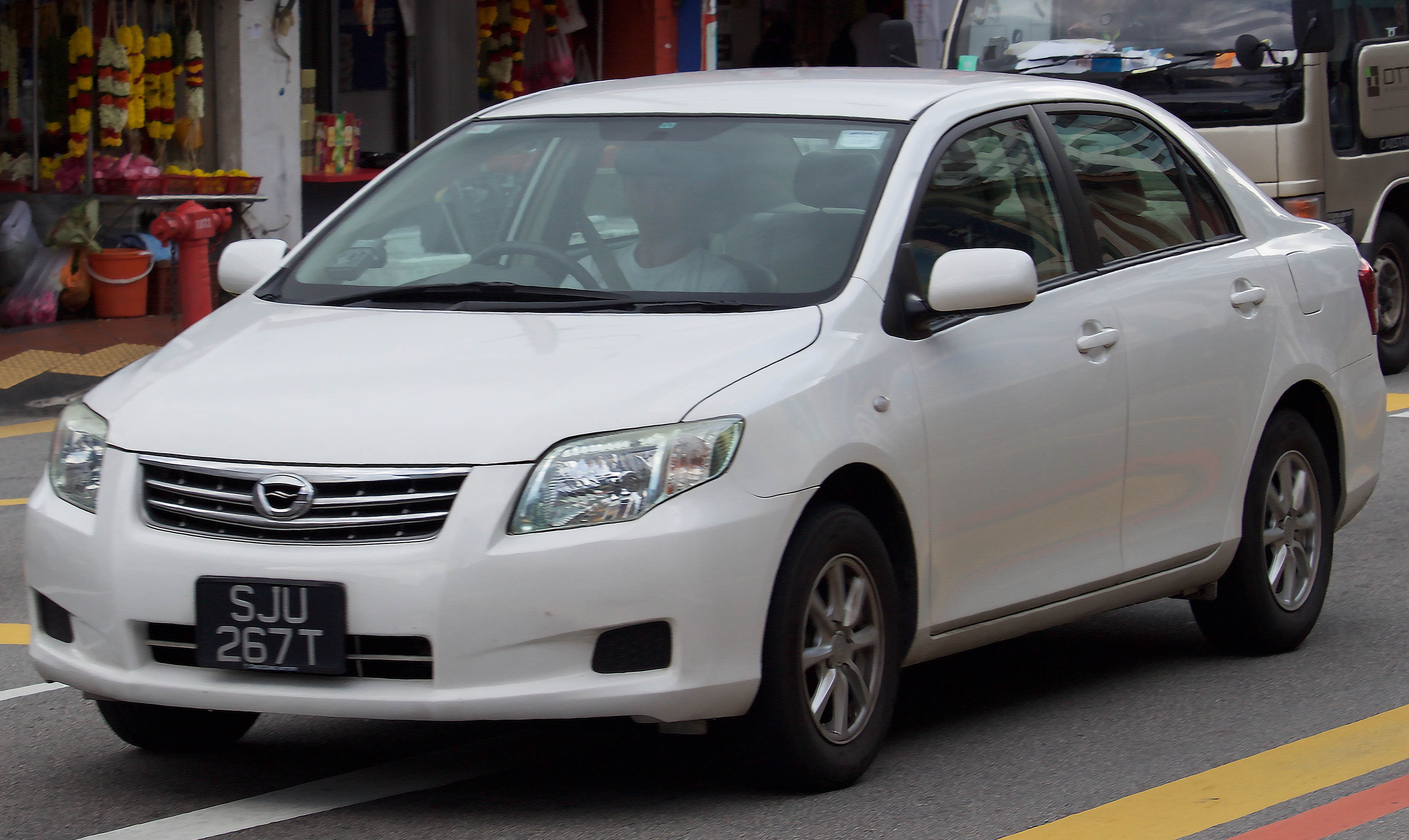
Corolla Axio (Singapore; facelift)

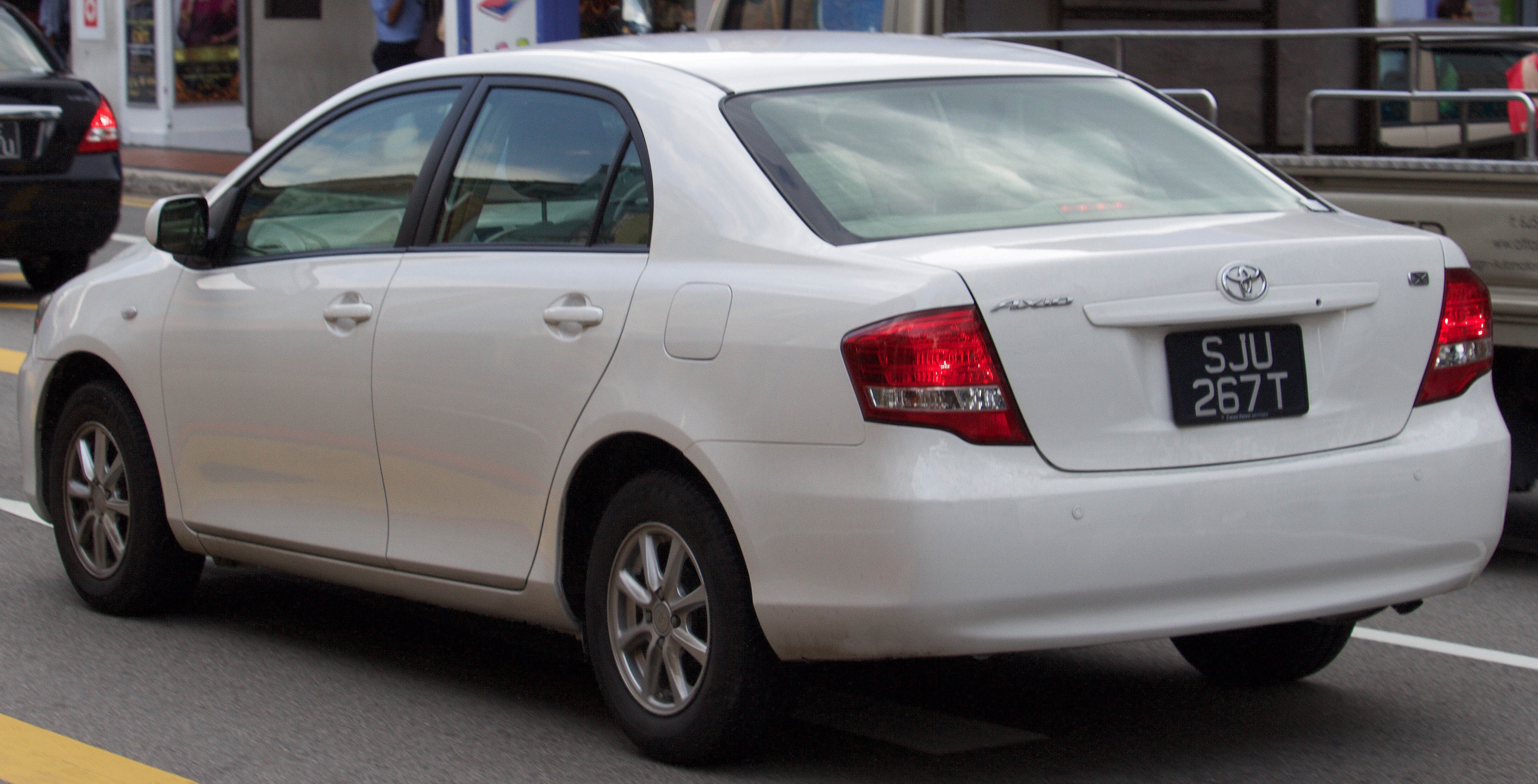
Corolla Axio (Singapore; facelift)

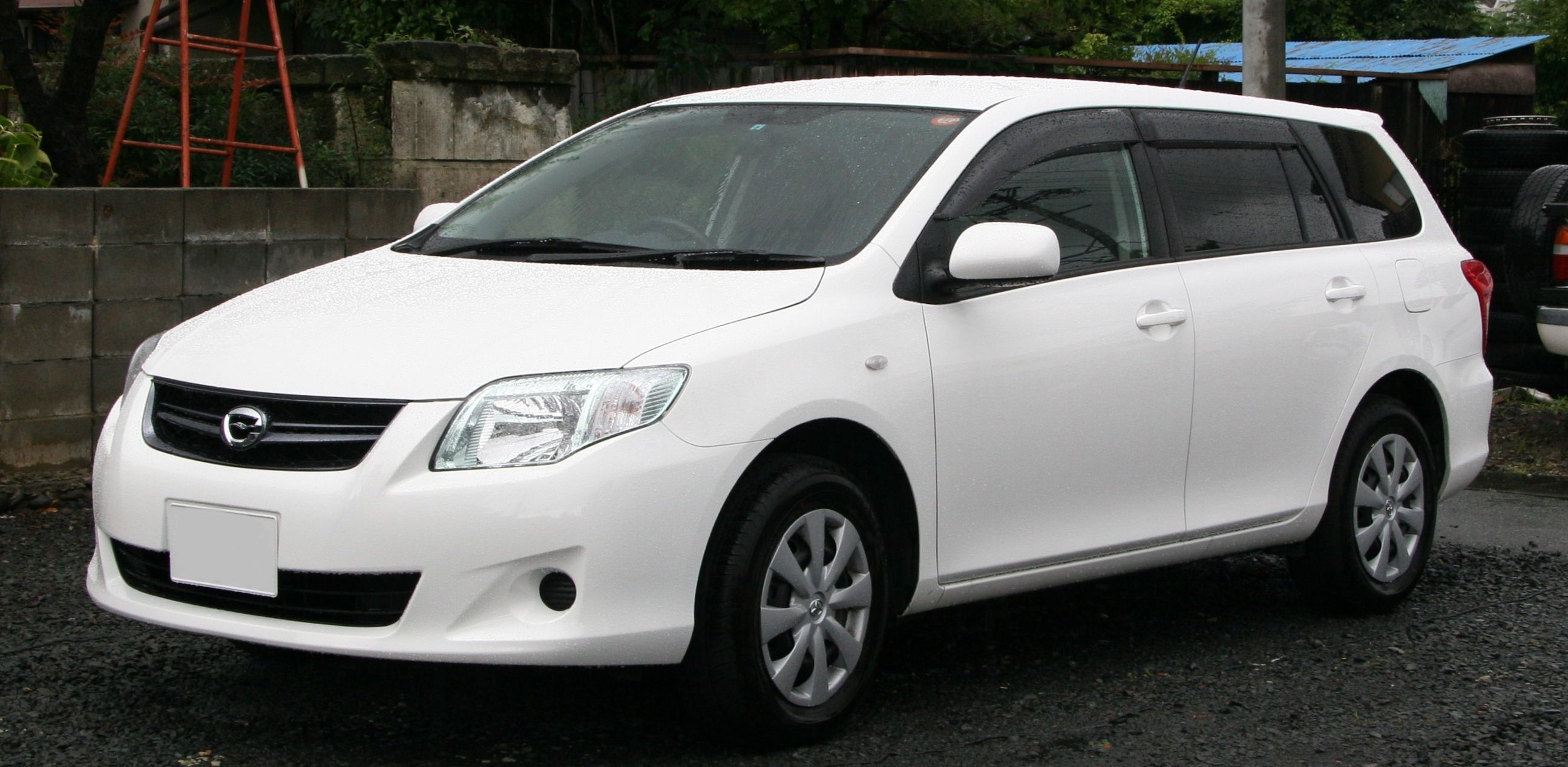
Corolla Fielder (Japan; facelift)

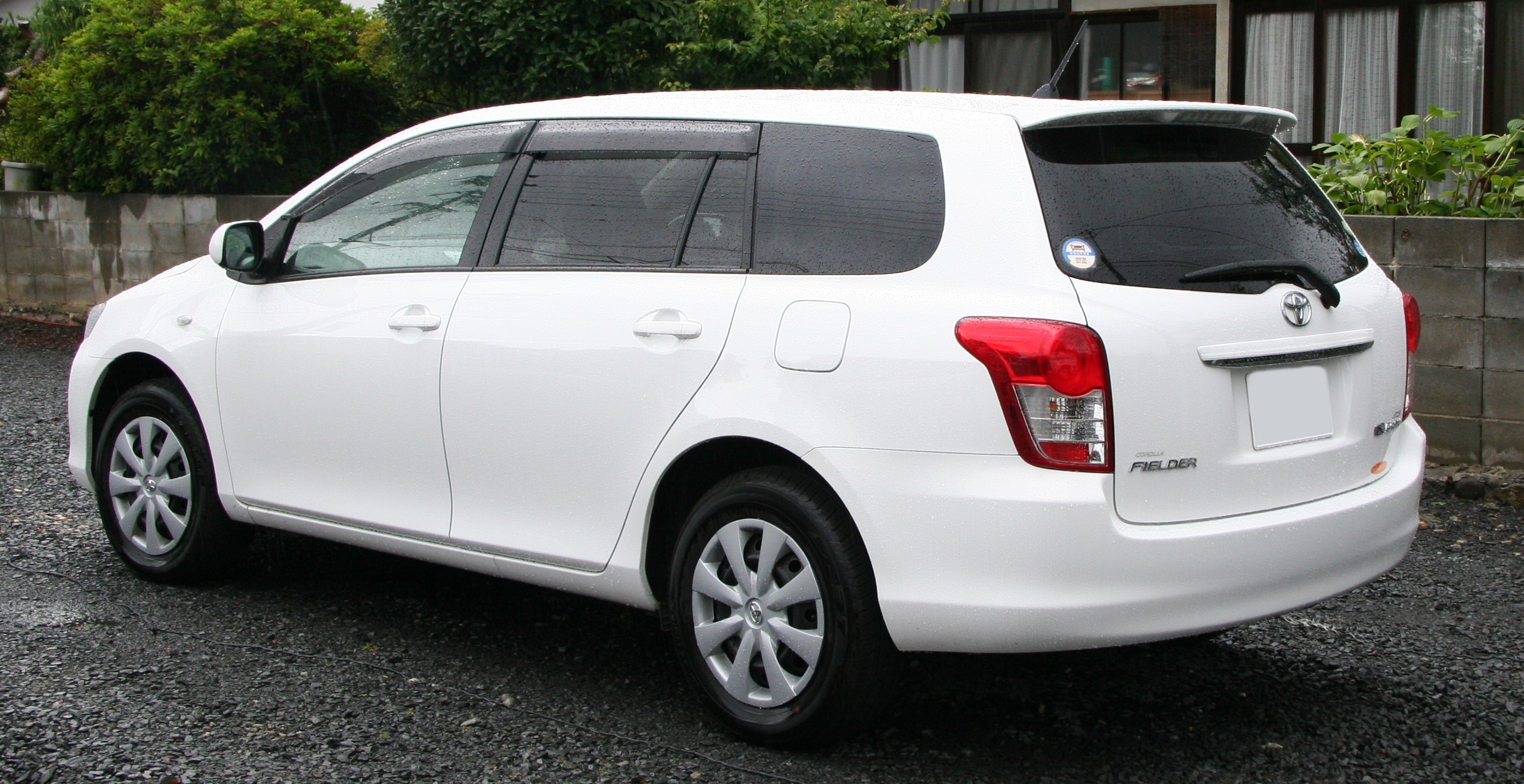
Corolla Fielder (Japan; facelift)

The Axio GT is a version based on the Axio N2 race car. It includes turbocharged 1NZ-FE engine rated 150 PS (110 kW; 148 bhp) and 196 N⋅m (145 lb⋅ft), intercooler, 5-speed manual transmission, TRD Sportivo suspension, 'GT' emblem, leather shift knob, 'TRD Turbo' aero grille, front spoiler, side mud guard, TF4 17-inch wheels with Michelin Pilot Preceda PP2 215/45R17 tires, rear spoiler, drive monitor, grey interior, enhanced clutch cover. The vehicle went on sale in February 2009 in Japan.

The GT TRD and TRD GT Packages are accessory packages for Corolla Axio (GT TRD) and Corolla Fielder (TRD GT).

Grade, Model (code)	Displacement, Type (code)	Power, Torque	Transmission
LUXEL (ZRE142)	1,797 cc (109.7 cu in) I4 (2ZR-FE)	136 PS (100 kW) at 6000 rpm, 175 N⋅m (129 lb⋅ft) at 4400 rpm	Super CVT-i
G, X (NZE141)	1,496 cc (91.3 cu in) I4 (1NZ-FE)	110 PS (81 kW) at 6000 rpm, 140 N⋅m (103 lb⋅ft) at 4400 rpm	Super CVT-i / 5-speed manual
Axio "GT"	1,496 cc (91.3 cu in) I4 turbo (1NZ-FTE)	150 PS (110 kW) at 6000 rpm, 200 N⋅m (148 lb⋅ft) at 4800 rpm	5-speed manual

In motorsports, Team apr participated in the GT300 class of Super GT, replacing their MR-S with a midship-layout Axio for the 2009 season. The mid-engined Corolla Axio apr GT (NZE141) includes the 3.5-litre 2GR-FSE V6 engine rated over 300 PS (221 kW; 296 bhp) at 6800 rpm, Hewland 6-speed sequential transmission, Ogura Clutch Triple Plate, AP Braking System, and RAYS 18-inch wheels. The apr GT race car weighs roughly 1100 kg. The vehicle No.74 was unveiled at the 2009 Tokyo Auto Salon.

== E140 wide-body ==
The wide-body version of the E140 Corolla was released from late 2007 as a 2008 model year and is larger in dimensions, while retaining many aspects in styling found on the Japanese model. In July 2010, a facelift to the Corolla Altis was introduced, with new ZR engines replacing the ZZ engines found on the 1.6L and 1.8L models. New bumpers, grille, air dams, rear combination lamps differentiate the facelift from the earlier model years.

A subtle difference between the E140 wide body and that of the E150 wide body would be at the front and rear fender panel lines that are between the front and the rear wheel arch; the international E140 has in-built side skirts that fuses with the side profile of the car while the E150 does not.

The models which use a wider and longer version of the Axio's platform, have styling similar to that of the Camry's while providing a list of added equipment towards its interior standard list.

A facelift was done in mid-2010, which revised the front and rear fascia of the Corolla with new bumpers and slimmer grille reminiscent to the Camry. New ZR engines replaced the outgoing ZZ engines for the 1.6-litre and 1.8-litre models.

=== Asia ===
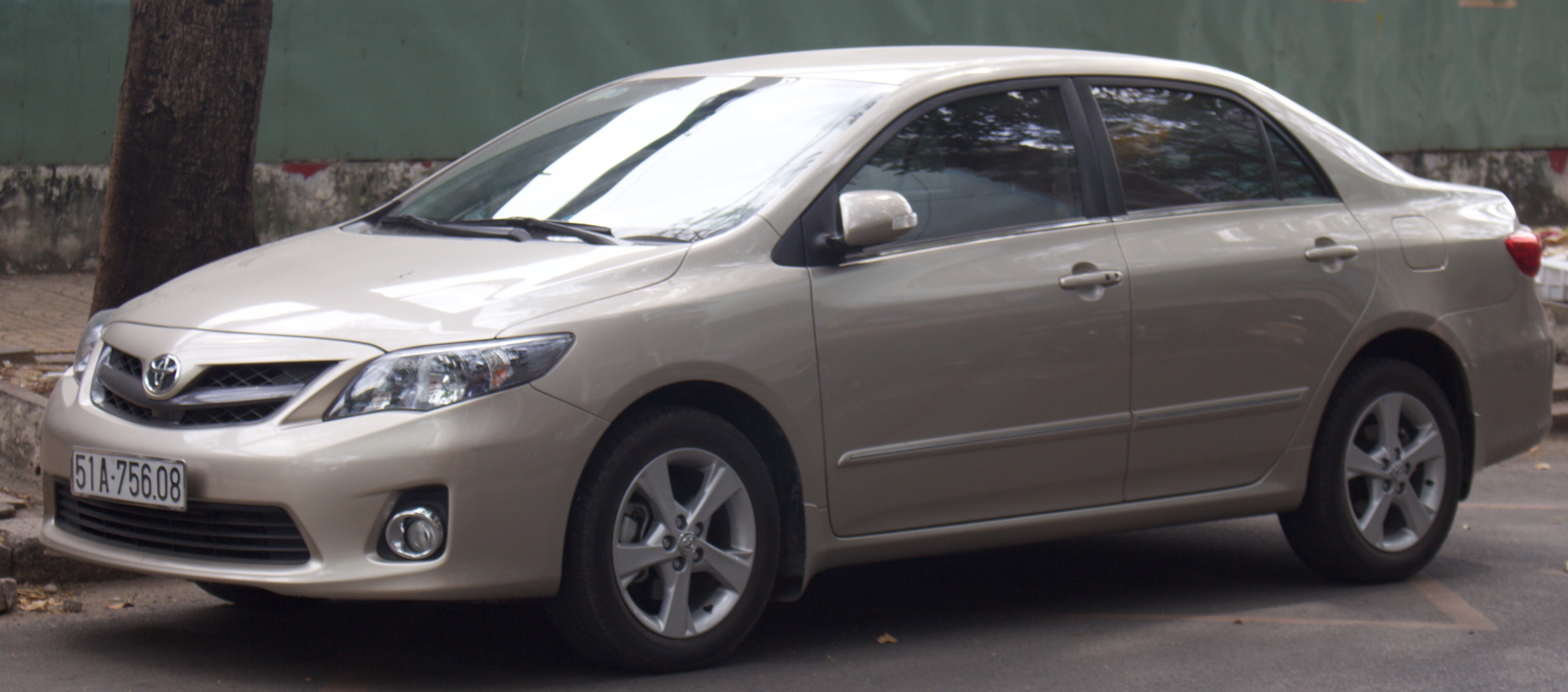
Facelift Toyota Corolla Altis 2.0V (ZRE143, Vietnam)

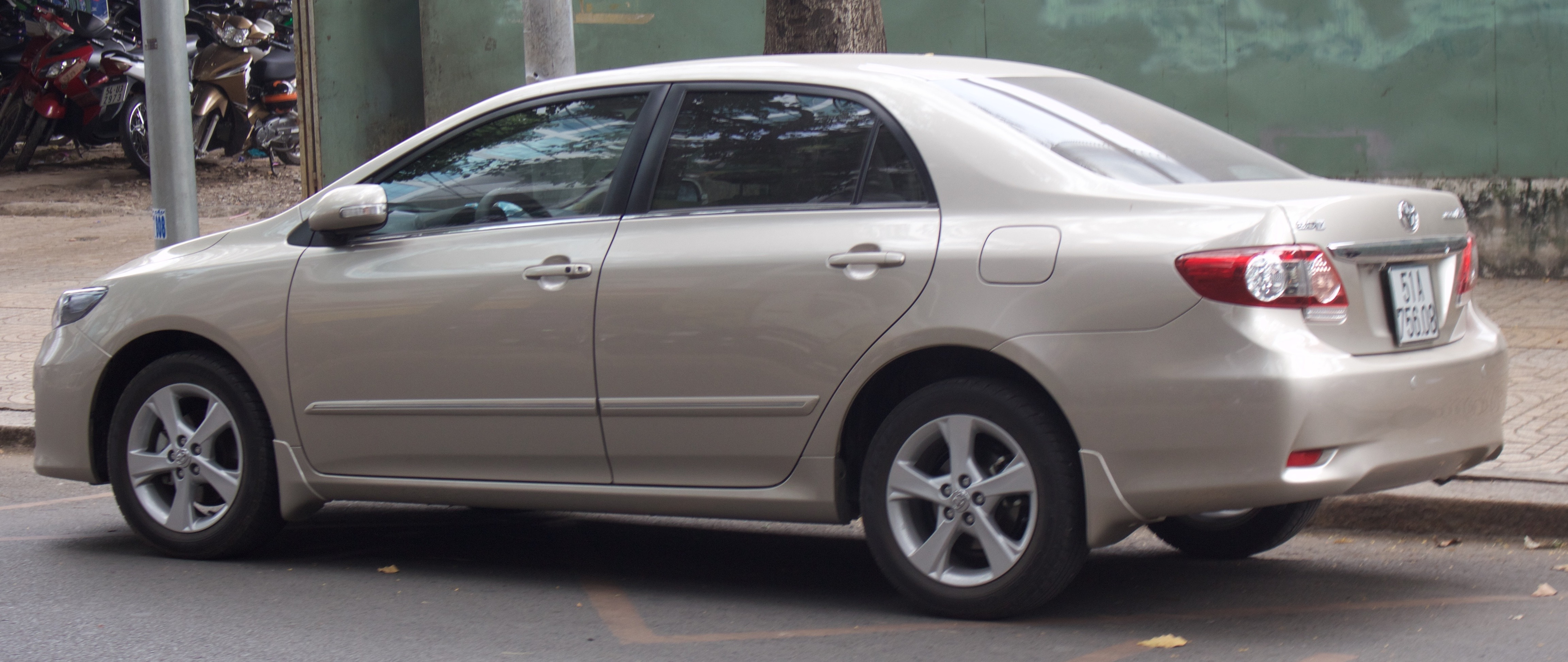
Facelift Toyota Corolla Altis 2.0V (ZRE143, Vietnam)

Hong Kong

In Hong Kong, Corollas sold were based on the international market models and the Corolla was fitted with the 1.5-litre 1NZ-FE engine. The Corolla sold in Hong Kong is made in Japan, although it does vary from the Japanese market model with minor revisions to the front such as the headlamps and air dams. It is available in Luxury and Advantage variants.

India

The Indian version of the Corolla marketed as 'Corolla Altis' is assembled in Bidadi near Bangalore. The pre-facelift version (2008–2010) had a 1.8-litre ZZ engine with 132 bhp mated to a 5-speed manual or a 4-speed automatic gearbox. A 1.4-litre 1ND-TV diesel engine unique to India and Spain with 88 bhp mated to a 6-speed manual gearbox debuted in 2010. In 2011, the Altis was facelifted and the older ZZ engine was replaced by an updated 1.8 ZR engine producing 140 bhp and was mated to a 6-speed manual like the diesel while a CVT gearbox replaced the outdated 4-speed automatic. The diesel was left untouched mechanically and had a different grille to differentiate it from the petrol.

Indonesia

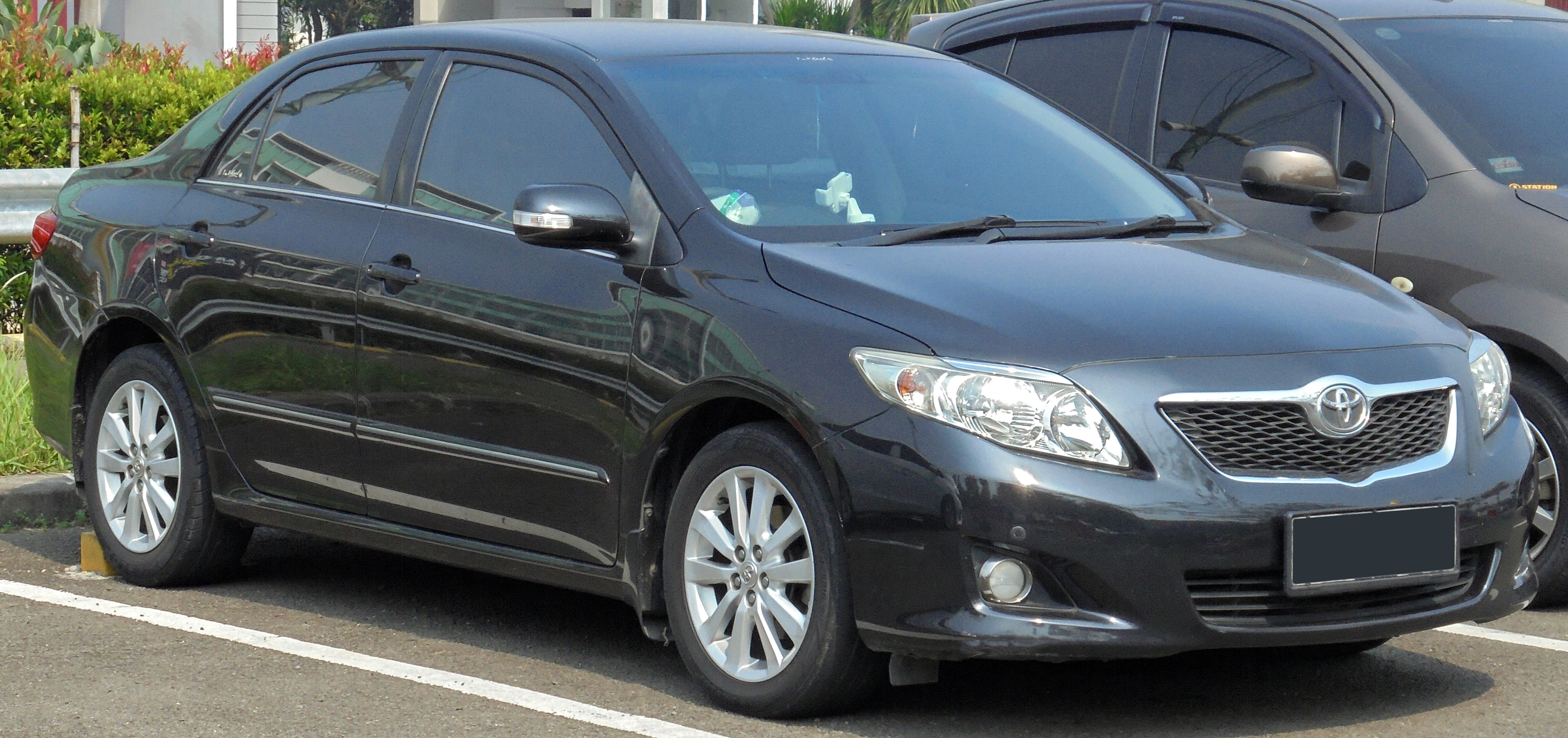
2010 Toyota Corolla Altis 2.0 V (Indonesia; pre-facelift)

The Corolla Altis was launched on 28 February 2008, and offered in the base J, popular mid-level G, and luxury V trim levels. All were powered by the 1.8-litre 1ZZ-FE engine with VVT-i. The J is only available with manual transmission, while the G and V are automatic only. On 30 April 2009, the V's 1.8-litre 1ZZ-FE engine was replaced with a 2.0-litre 3ZR-FE engine, mated to an automatic transmission. The G and V trim levels featured smart entry with start button system and automatic climate control.

In July 2010, the facelifted Corolla Altis was launched with the new 1.8-litre 2ZR-FE engine with Dual VVT-i. The 1.8 J was replaced with the new 1.8 E as the base trim level. Mated with the new engines, the base but sporty 1.8 E received a 6-speed manual transmission, while the 1.8 G and 2.0 V came with a CVT.

Malaysia

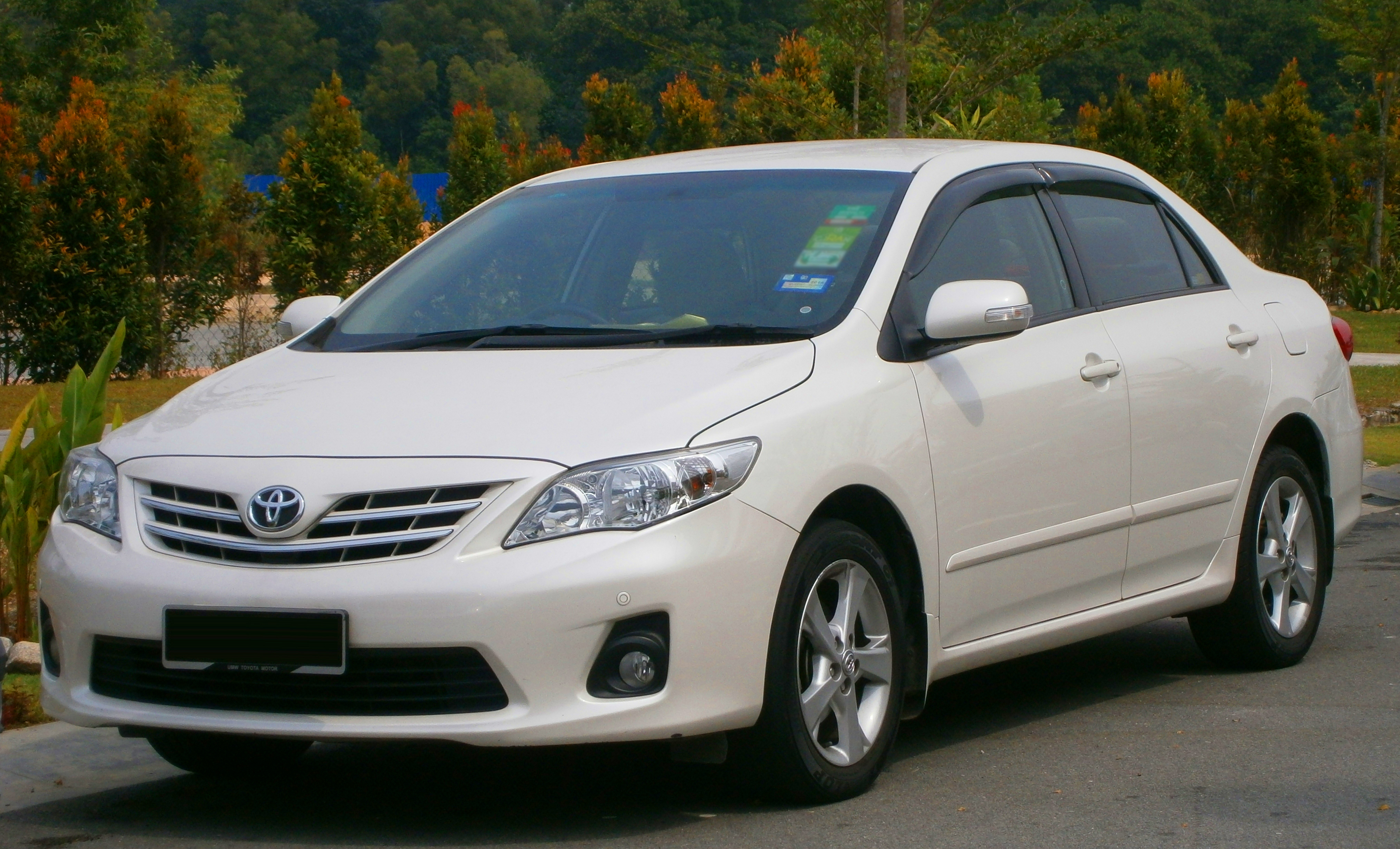

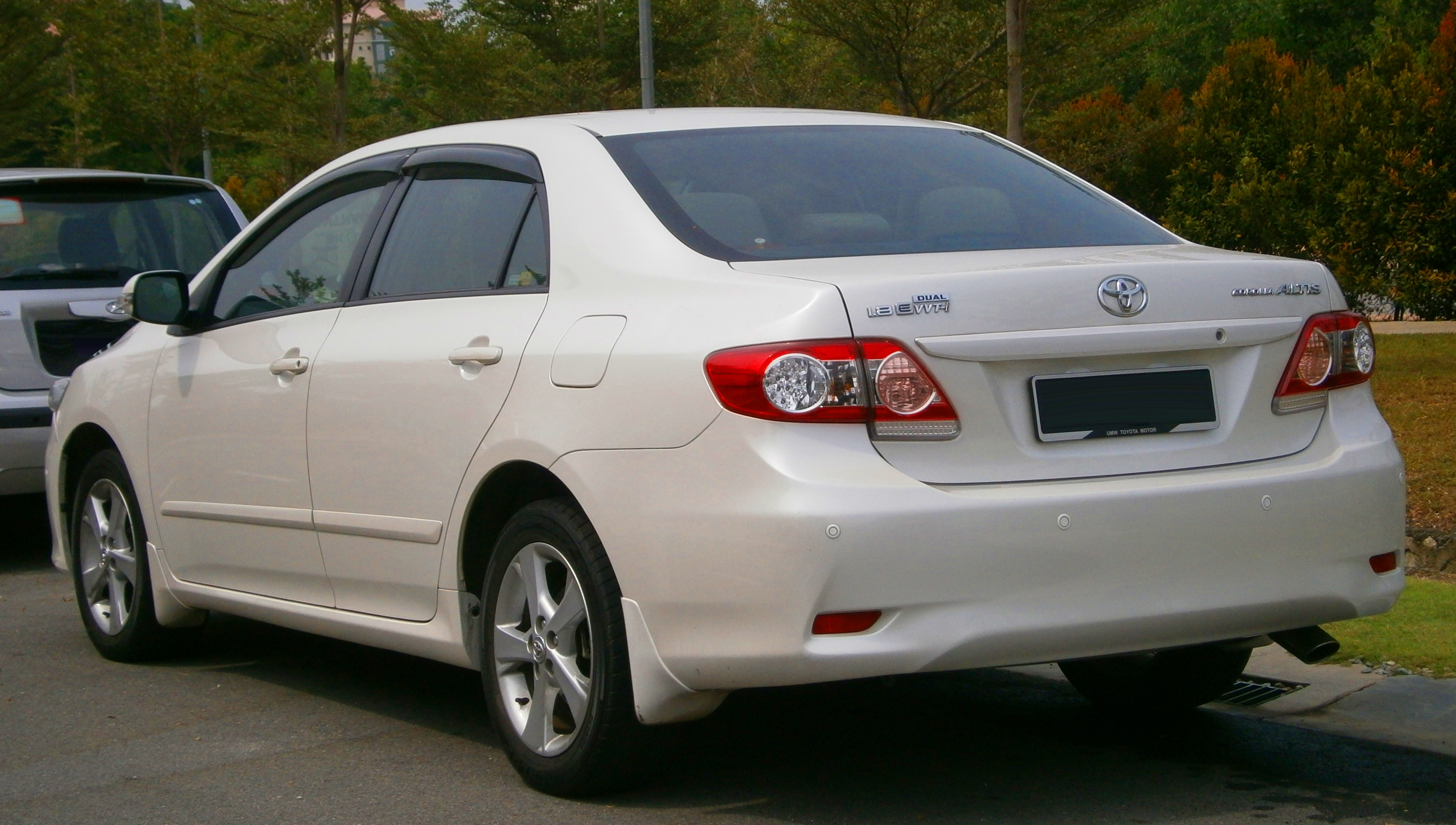
Facelift Corolla Altis 1.8 E (ZRE142, Malaysia)

As with Indonesia, the Corolla Altis was launched in March 2008 in Malaysia as well. It was offered in 5 variants – 1.8G, 1.8G Sporty, 1.8E, 1.8E Sporty and 1.6E. All variants were equipped with the 1ZZ-FE engine model with the exception of the 1.6E, that used the 3ZZ-FE engine. Each of these 5 variants only came with 4-speed automatic transmission with Super ECT.

Output for the 1.8 model was 97 kW (132 hp) at 6000 rpm with 170 N⋅m (125 lb⋅ft) at 4200 rpm. Output for the 1.6 model was 80 kW (109 hp) at 6000 rpm with 145 N⋅m (107 lb⋅ft) at 4400 rpm.

On 23 September 2010, a facelift to the Corolla Altis was launched where the ZZ engines were replaced by ZR engines. Toyota Malaysia has designated the new variants as 2.0V, 1.8G, 1.8E and 1.6E. All variants' engines are mated with CVT – except the 1.6E remained with Super ECT 4-speed automatic transmission.

Specifications for the facelifted models are:

Models	Engine	Power	Torque
1.6E	1598 cc I4 (1ZR-FE)	90 kW (122 PS; 121 hp) at 6000 rpm	154 N⋅m (114 lb⋅ft) at 5200 rpm
1.8E/1.8G	1798 cc I4 (2ZR-FE)	103 kW (140 PS; 138 hp) at 6400 rpm	173 N⋅m (128 lb⋅ft) at 4000 rpm
2.0V	1986 cc I4 (3ZR-FE)	107 kW (145 PS; 143 hp) at 5600 rpm	187 N⋅m (138 lb⋅ft) at 3600 rpm

Pakistan

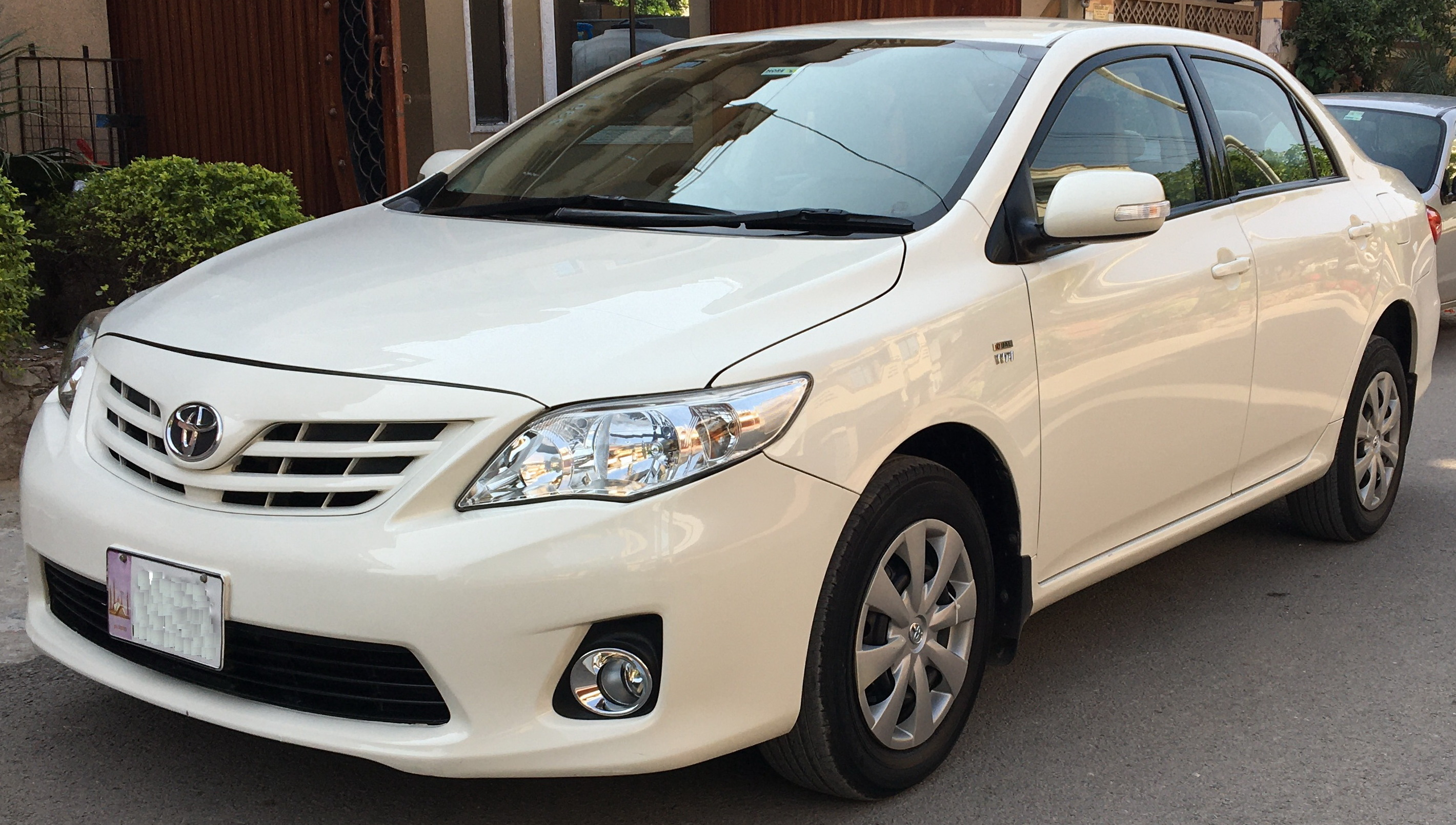
2013 Toyota Corolla 1.6 GLi (ZRE141, facelift, Pakistan)

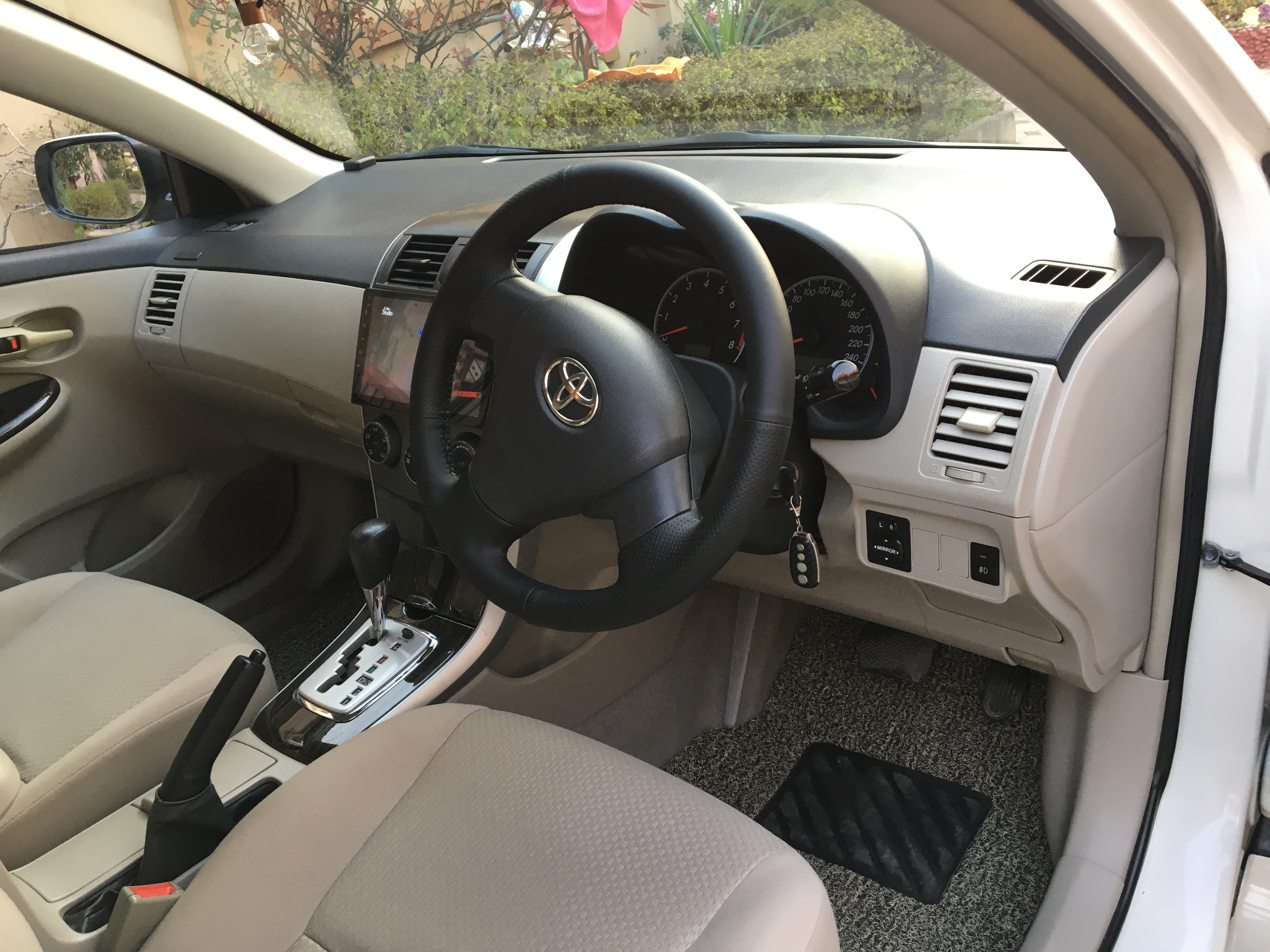
Toyota Corolla interior (Pakistan)

In Pakistan, the E140 Corolla was launched in August 2008. It was offered in four trim levels: XLi, GLi, Altis and Corolla Diesel. The facelift version was launched in April 2011.

The XLi was offered with the 1.3L 2NZ-FE VVT-i Inline 4 engine. Pakistan was the only market to use the 2NZ-FE in the Corolla. This model did not include airbags, ABS or power windows. It was only offered in two colours, black and white.

The GLi had the same engine and specifications as the XLi but the GLi was equipped with ABS, and power windows. Just like the XLi, the GLi was not fitted with airbags. Metallic colours were available in the GLi.

The Toyota Corolla Altis was found in the 1.6, 1.8, 1.6SR, and 1.8SR trims and had alloy rims.

The Corolla diesel was available in two trim levels: Corolla 2.0D and the Corolla 2.0D Saloon. The Corolla 2.0D was equipped with Toyota's 1974 cc, 2C engine which produced 74 hp. It did not have airbags, ABS or power windows. It was only offered in two colours: black and white.

The Corolla 2.0D Saloon had the same engine as the Corolla 2.0D, but this variant was only available with a 5-speed manual. The 2.0D Saloon came with alloy rims, side skirts, Optitron gauges, wooden inserts in the interior and a single driver side airbag. Optional extra on the model is the sunroof.

The facelift for the Corolla was launched on 11 April 2011. Initially only the XLi and GLi trims were available, with modifications to the front and rear lights, front grille, and bumpers, along with a revised interior colour scheme. The 1.8L model with the 1ZZ-FE engine was ceased and was replaced with the 1.6L model with the 1ZR-FE engine producing 122 bhp. The facelift Altis was launched in May 2011. The Altis comes with wood grain panel inserts in the interior, optitron speedometer, 5-spoke alloy rims, fog lamps, power windows, power seats, ABS with EBD, driver side SRS airbag and a 6-speed (forward) manual transmission. Optional on the Altis is a 4-speed super ECT automatic transmission and sunroof.

The GLi model is also offered with a 4-speed super ECT automatic transmission and the 1.6L 1ZR-FE engine. This version of the GLi is the same as the 1.3L GLi, albeit with the 1.6L engine and the 4-speed ECT automatic transmission, hence making it very similar to the Altis, save for the alloy rims and the wooden inserts in the interior.

Philippines

The tenth generation Corolla was launched as the Corolla Altis in the Philippines on 7 March 2008. It has three variants, the 2.0, 1.8 and 1.6 V, all came with automatic transmission, the 1.6 G available in either manual or automatic transmission, and the 1.6 E, with manual transmission. The 1.6-litre and 1.8-litre engine is the same 3ZZ-FE and 1ZZ-FE motor used in the ninth generation Corolla, whereas the 2.0-litre variant is powered by the newer 3ZR-FE engine equipped with Dual VVT-i technology.

Toyota Motor Philippines upgraded the Corolla Altis in September 2010. The 2.0V is equipped with CVT to replace the 4-speed AT while the manual transmission for the 1.6 variants have six gears instead of the previous five. All variants uses the newer ZR engines equipped with Dual VVT-i technology.

A minor update to the Altis was launched in the later part of 2011. Powered windows and central-locking doors were as standard on the facelifted model with new bumper design. Four variants were available:

- 2.0 V (3ZR-FE)
  Sport variant, only available with a CVT and Paddle Shift. It has a mesh grille instead of the bar-type, smoked High Intensity Discharge (HID) headlamps with manual levelling, wipers with auto rain sensor, leather seats, powered seats and folding mirrors and sports package pre-installed.
- 1.6 V (1ZR-FE)
  Range-topping variant, has almost the same specs as the 2.0V, except the mesh grille and sport packages, although these are optional. It is only available with a 4-speed automatic transmission.
- 1.6 G (1ZR-FE)
  Middle variant, with an option for a 4-speed automatic or a 6-speed manual transmission. Has the same specs as the V variant without leather seats.
- 1.6 E (1ZR-FE)
  Base variant, only available with a 6-speed manual transmission, with much fewer equipment and colour choices. No leather seats, no auto climate control (uses manual switch knobs), no fog lamps, no Toyota factory fitted alarm system.

Singapore

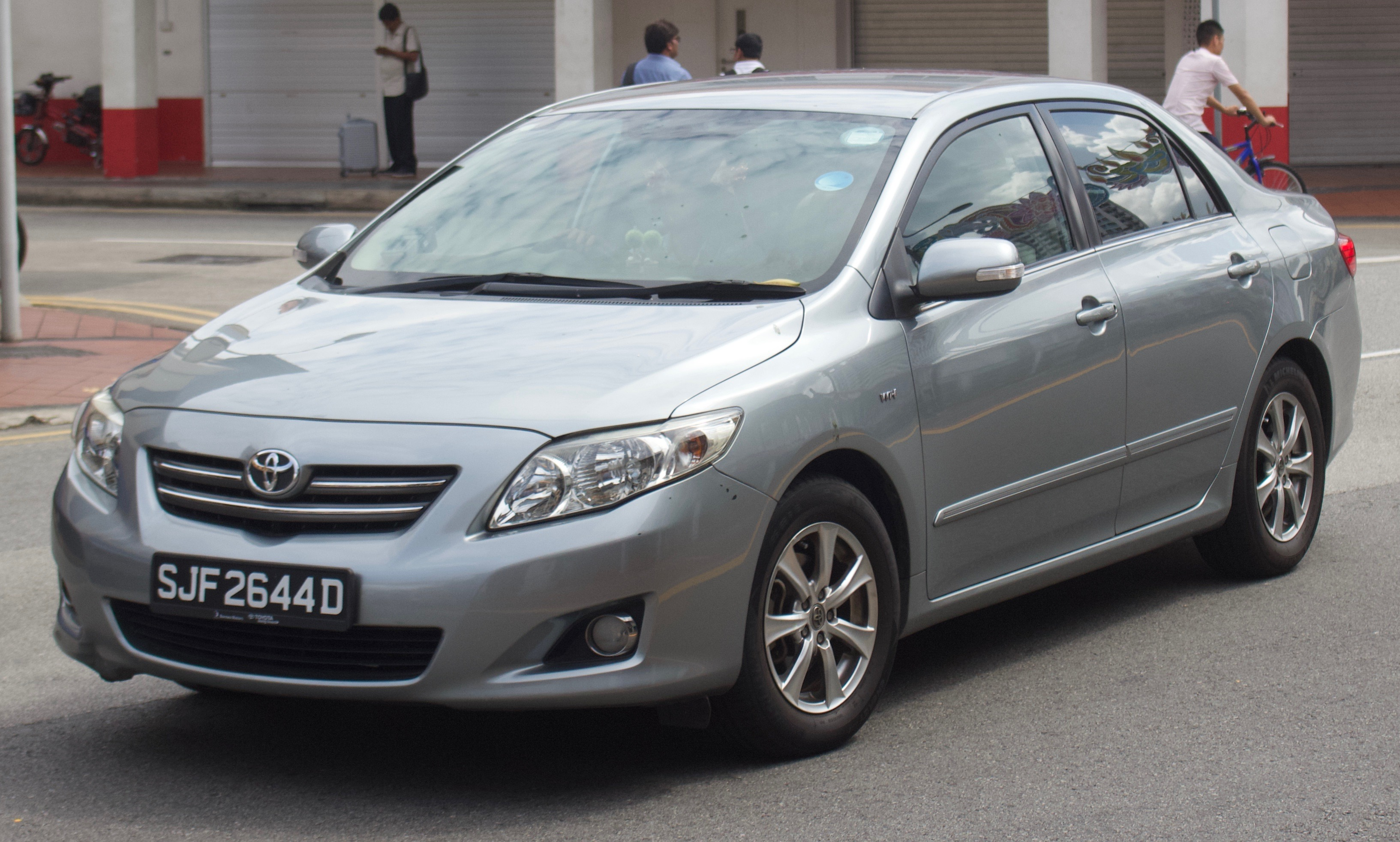

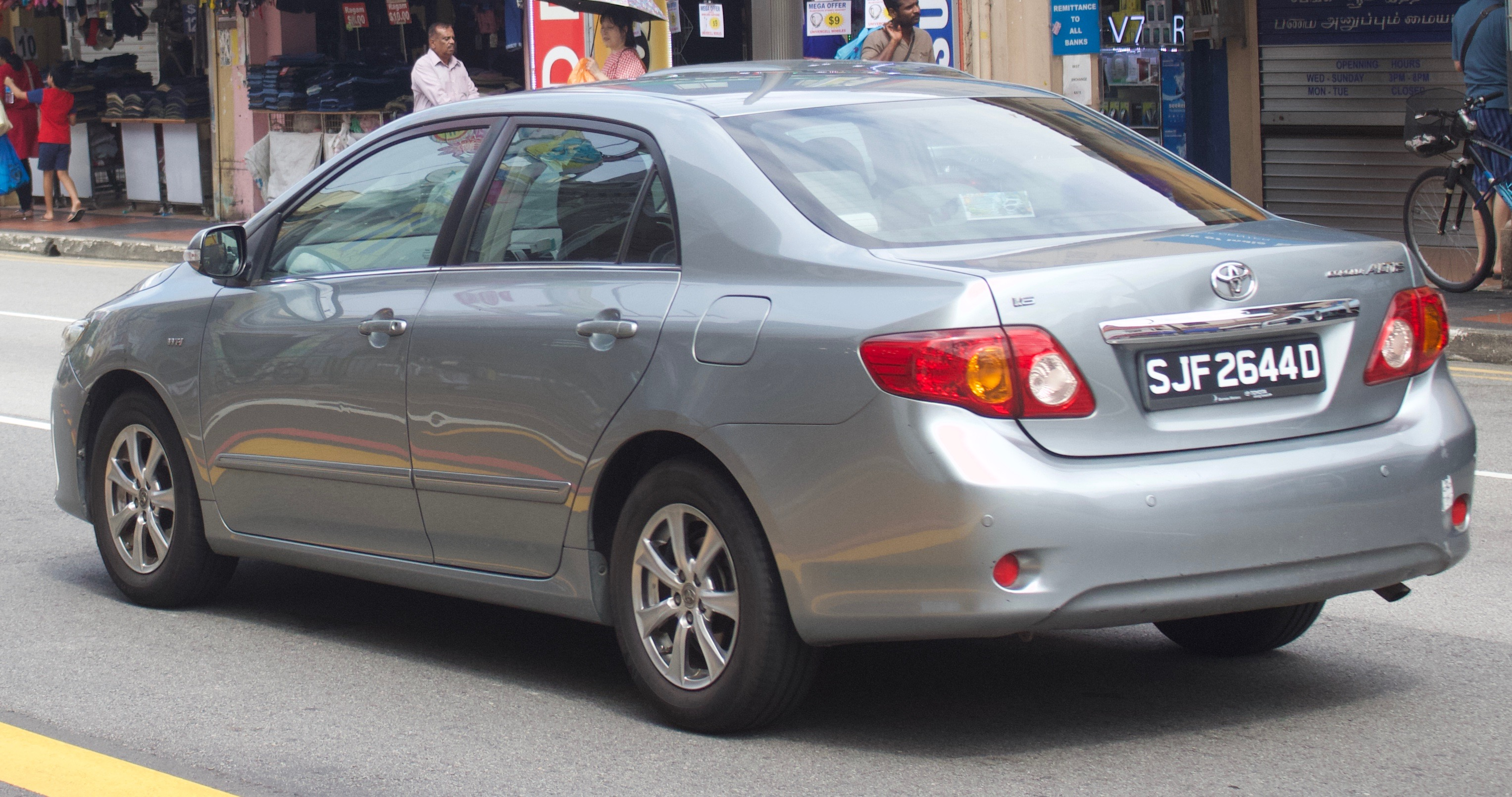
Pre-facelift Corolla Altis 1.6 (ZZE141, Singapore)

Singapore received the E140 Corolla Altis on 6 December 2007, and it was the first Asian market to receive the 10th generation Corolla. 1.6-litre 3ZZ-FE and 1.8-litre 1ZZ-FE engines were used from the previous generation and were continued to be marketed in 1.6 and 1.8-litre variants. Automatic transmissions were only available to meet Euro IV emission standards at that time. In late 2008 for a short period, the Altis was offered with racing bodykit alongside the Vios including a low bootlid spoiler, aftermarket 16" rims, brushed silver gear knob and pedals, with a "racing" badge to differentiate its special run. Thereafter trims for the 1.6 model were split into LX and Elegance, with the latter having multi-spoke 15-inch rims, chromed inner door handles and touchscreen audio head-unit with reverse camera.

In September 2010, the facelifted model of the Altis was introduced, utilising Dual VVT-i engine technology (i.e. 1ZR-FE) for the 1.6-litre version meeting the Euro V emissions standards. From 2012 onwards, the base model did away without foglamps while the higher Elegance trim received factory installed head-unit, foglamps and a different set of 15-inch rims. Across the model years, the 1.6 model remained the more popular choice; it was Singapore's best selling car for consecutive years.

There is also a Japanese market model (including Axio saloon and Fielder estate) available under parallel import status (parallel dealers buy the vehicle overseas and do the shipping, custom declaration, vehicle testing, and provided in-house warranty by themselves) instead from the local dealer. Grades available are the standard X variant and the higher-spec X "Special edition" variant. The Japanese market model, along with the Japanese market Camry and Wish, were once fitted with CNG and used on a small number of taxis there.

Sri Lanka

A Japanese-built version of the Corolla saloon is sold in Sri Lanka. The petrol version is offered with the 1.6-litre 3ZZ engine while the diesel version on offer has the 2-litre 2C engine with 5-speed manual transmission only. The body shape is same as ASEAN-marketed Corolla Altis design. This model is locally known as the Corolla 141.

Taiwan

The Corolla Altis was launched on 2 February 2008, and offered in the base J, mid-level G, and luxury V trim levels. All were powered by the 1.8-litre 1ZZ-FE engine with VVT-i. The 1.6-litre 3ZZ-FE engine with VVT-i, while the G and V are automatic only. In early 2009, the J's 1.6-litre 3ZZ-FE engine was replaced with a 2.0-litre 3ZR-FE engine, mated to an automatic transmission. The G and V trim levels feature smart entry and start system and automatic climate control.

In July 2010, the facelifted Corolla Altis with new bumpers and rear combination lamps was introduced, with the newer 1.8-litre 2ZR-FE engine with Dual VVT-i. The 1.8 J was replaced with new 1.8 E as the base trim level. Mated with the new engines, the 1.8 E and 2.0 E came with a CVT.

Thailand

The all-new Corolla Altis was introduced in Thailand on 29 January 2008. Thailand, which also currently manufactures the model, offered a total of five grades (J, E, G, S and V) throughout its run. It was initially available in 3 grades (J, E and G) paired with both 1.6-litre 3ZZ-FE and 1.8-litre 1ZZ-FE engines, the 2.0-litre 3ZR-FE engine with the addition of two new grades (S and V) was launched later on 7 May 2009. It is available in five-speed Manual (3ZZ-FE only) and four-speed automatic transmissions depending on the grade. The taxi-focused Corolla Limo was launched in October 2008, featuring the 1.6-litre 3ZZ-FE CNG engine paired with five-speed manual transmission. Unlike the regular Corolla and Corolla Altis models, it is only available with 14-inch steel rims with hubcaps and it is only offered for taxi companies and co-operatives, added in October 2008.

Marketed as Corolla:

- 1.6 Limo CNG – 1.6 litre DOHC 3ZZ-FE CNG VVT-i engine, 5-speed manual transmission, 4-spoke polyurethane steering wheel, includes tachometer, electric power steering, windows and door locks, standard gauge instrument cluster, single-din AM/FM radio with CD player and Auxiliary input, manual dial-type air conditioning, gray Vinyl seats, matte black door handles, standard headlamps and 15-inch steel rims with hubcaps, only available to Taxi Companies.
- 1.6 J – 1.6 litre DOHC 3ZZ-FE VVT-i engine, 5-speed manual and 4-speed automatic transmission with Super ECT, same specifications and features with the 1.6 Limo CNG model with the removal of CNG kits and the inclusion of power mirrors with retractable function, integrated AM/FM radio with CD, MP3 and WMA player and Auxiliary input, gray Fabric seats, colour-keyed door handles, 15-inch alloy rims and Toyota Vehicle Security System (TVSS) with auto alarm function on 1.6J Automatic model.

Marketed as Corolla Altis:

- 1.6 E CNG – 1.6 litre DOHC 3ZZ-FE Advanced CNG VVT-i engine, 4-speed automatic transmission with Super ECT, same specifications and features with the 1.6J model with the inclusion of CNG kits, including power mirrors with retractable function, beige Fabric seats and Toyota Vehicle Security System (TVSS) with auto alarm function, added in May 2009.
- 1.6 E – 1.6 litre DOHC 3ZZ-FE VVT-i engine, 5-speed manual and 4-speed automatic transmission with Super ECT, same specifications and features as the 1.6E CNG model with the removal of CNG kits and the inclusion of Anti-lock Braking System (ABS) with Electronic Brake-force Distribution (EBD).
- 1.6 G – 1.6 litre DOHC 3ZZ-FE VVT-i engine, 4-speed automatic transmission with Super ECT, 4-spoke urethane steering wheel, same specifications and features as the 1.6E with the inclusion of adjustable seatbelts and Dual SRS airbags.
- 1.8 E – 1.8 litre DOHC 1ZZ-FE VVT-i engine, 4-speed automatic transmission with Super ECT (Sequential-type), same features as the 1.6G with the inclusion of automatic climate control, rear centre armrest with Cupholders and front foglamps, added in May 2009.
- 1.8 G – 1.8 litre DOHC 1ZZ-FE VVT-i engine, 4-speed automatic transmission with Super ECT (Sequential-type), 4-spoke leather wrapped steering wheel with wood accents, same specifications and features as 1.8E trim with the inclusion of optitron gauge instrument cluster, Audio Controls on the steering wheel, genuine beige leather seats, 60/40 split-folding rear seats and 16-inch alloy rims, formerly marketed as the 1.8E model from January 2008 to April 2009.
- 1.8 S – 1.8 litre DOHC 1ZZ-FE VVT-i engine, 4-speed automatic transmission with Super ECT (Sequential-type), same specifications and features as 1.8G trim with the inclusion of standard projector-type Headlamps, Cruise Control, Vehicle Stability Control (VSC) and Traction Control (TRC), formerly marketed as the 1.8G model from January 2008 to April 2009.
- 2.0 G – 2.0 litre DOHC 3ZR-FE Dual VVT-i engine, 4-speed automatic transmission with Super ECT (Sequential-type), 3-spoke leather wrapped sport black steering wheel, same features as 1.8S trim with the inclusion of integrated AM/FM radio with CD, MP3 and WMA player that is capable of playing 6 CDs and Auxiliary input, genuine black leather seats and xenon-type projector HID headlamps, added in May 2009.
- 2.0 S – 2.0 litre DOHC 3ZR-FE Dual VVT-i engine, 4-speed automatic transmission with Super ECT (Sequential-type), same specifications and features as 2.0G trim with the inclusion of Advanced Toyota Vehicle Security System (TVSS) with Smart Keyless entry system, engine Start-Stop button and 6-way Power-adjustable front drivers seat, added in May 2009.
- 2.0 V Navi – 2.0 litre DOHC 3ZR-FE Dual VVT-i engine, 4-speed automatic transmission with Super ECT (Sequential-type), same specifications and features as 2.0S trim with the inclusion of Touchscreen display audio with built-in Navigation System and 4-way Power-adjustable front passenger seat, added in May 2009.

The Facelifted Corolla Altis was unveiled on 6 August 2010, featuring Redesigned front grille, inclusion of LED tail-lights and improved set of engines. The 1.6-litre 3ZZ-FE (except for the Advanced CNG models) and 1.8-litre 1ZZ-FE VVT-i engines were replaced by the newer 1.6-litre 1ZR-FE and 1.8-litre 2ZR-FE Dual VVT-i engines respectively, effectively joining with the 2.0-litre 3ZR-FE engine that is powered with the Dual VVT-i technology. The 1.8-litre and 2.0-litre variants of the facelifted Corolla Altis are fitted with the 7-speed Super CVT-i gearbox while the 1.6-litre variants remain using the same 4-speed automatic gearbox as earlier and the 1.6J Manual model was upgraded to 6 speed transmission setup, while the 1.6 CNG models retains the previous 5 speed transmission setup.

Marketed as Corolla:

- 1.6 CNG – 1.6 litre DOHC 3ZZ-FE CNG VVT-i engine, 5-speed manual transmission, 4-spoke polyurethane steering wheel, includes tachometer, electric power steering, windows and door locks, standard gauge instrument cluster, single-din AM/FM radio with CD player and Auxiliary input, manual dial-type air conditioning, gray Vinyl seats, matte black door handles, standard headlamps and 15-inch alloy rims.
- 1.6 J – 1.6 litre DOHC 1ZR-FE Dual VVT-i engine, 6-speed manual and 4-speed automatic transmission with Super ECT, same specifications and features with the 1.6 CNG model with the removal of CNG kits, with the inclusion of adjustable seatbelts, power mirrors with retractable function, integrated AM/FM radio with CD, MP3 and WMA player and Auxiliary input, gray Fabric seats, colour-keyed door handles, Toyota Vehicle Security System (TVSS) with auto alarm function on 1.6J Automatic model.

Marketed as Corolla Altis:

- 1.6 E CNG – 1.6 litre DOHC 3ZZ-FE Advanced CNG VVT-i engine, 4-speed automatic transmission with Super ECT, same specifications and features with the 1.6J model with the inclusion of CNG kits, including power mirrors with retractable function, beige Fabric seats and Toyota Vehicle Security System (TVSS) with auto alarm function.
- 1.6 E – 1.6 litre DOHC 1ZR-FE Dual VVT-i engine, 4-speed automatic transmission with Super ECT, same specifications and features as the 1.6E CNG model with the removal of CNG kits and the inclusion of Anti-lock Braking System (ABS) with Electronic Brake-force Distribution (EBD).
- 1.6 G – 1.6 litre DOHC 1ZR-FE Dual VVT-i engine, 4-speed automatic transmission with Super ECT, 4-spoke urethane steering wheel, same specifications and features as the 1.6E with the inclusion of adjustable seatbelts and Dual SRS airbags.
- 1.8 E – 1.8 litre DOHC 2ZR-FE Dual VVT-i engine, 7-speed Super CVT-i transmission with Super ECT (Sequential-type), same features as the 1.6G with the inclusion of automatic climate control, rear centre armrest and front foglamps.
- 1.8 G – 1.8 litre DOHC 2ZR-FE Dual VVT-i engine, 7-speed Super CVT-i transmission with Super ECT (Sequential-type), 4-spoke leather wrapped steering wheel with wood accents, same specifications and features as 1.8E trim with the inclusion of optitron gauge instrument cluster, Audio Controls on the steering wheel, integrated AM/FM radio with CD, MP3 and WMA player that is capable of playing 6 CDs and Auxiliary input, genuine beige leather seats, 60/40 split-folding rear seats, standard projector-type Headlamps, Cruise Control, Vehicle Stability Control (VSC), Traction Control (TRC) and 16-inch alloy rims.
- 1.8 S – 1.8 litre DOHC 2ZR-FE Dual VVT-i engine, 7-speed Super CVT-i transmission with Super ECT (Sequential-type), 4-spoke leather wrapped black steering wheel, same specifications and features as 1.8G trim with the inclusion of Rear spoiler, side skirts, front and rear skirts and genuine black leather seats.
- 2.0 G – 2.0 litre DOHC 3ZR-FE Dual VVT-i engine, 7-speed Super CVT-i transmission with Super ECT (Sequential-type), same features as 1.8S trim with the exception of Rear spoiler, side skirts and front and rear skirts and the inclusion of xenon-type HID headlamps with manual leveling mode.
- 2.0 S – 2.0 litre DOHC 3ZR-FE VVT-i engine, 7-speed Super CVT-i transmission with Super ECT (Sequential-type), same specifications and features as 2.0G trim with the inclusion of Advanced Toyota Vehicle Security System (TVSS) with Smart Keyless entry system and engine Start-Stop button, 6-way Power-adjustable front drivers seat and Rear Spoiler.
- 2.0 V Navi – 2.0 litre DOHC 3ZR-FE VVT-i engine, 7-speed Super CVT-i transmission with Super ECT (Sequential-type), same specifications and features as 2.0S trim with the inclusion of Touchscreen display audio with built-in Navigation System and 4-way Power-adjustable front passenger seat.

The facelifted Corolla Altis received minor updates on 15 November 2012 for the 2013 model, The 1.8-litre 2ZR-FE engine was replaced with the E85-compliant 2ZR-FBE Flexi-fuel engine. The 1.6J with 4-speed automatic transmission and 1.6E grades were discontinued, while the 1.8S was rebranded to 1.8 TRD Sportivo, the 2.0G grade was replaced with the 1.8G Navi trim and the 2.0S grade was rebranded to 2.0V trim.

Marketed as Corolla:

- 1.6 CNG – 1.6 litre DOHC 3ZZ-FE CNG VVT-i engine, 5-speed manual transmission, 4-spoke polyurethane steering wheel, includes tachometer, electric power steering, windows and door locks, standard gauge instrument cluster, single-din AM/FM radio with CD player and Auxiliary input, manual dial-type air conditioning, gray Vinyl seats, matte black door handles, standard headlamps and 15-inch alloy rims.
- 1.6 J – 1.6 litre DOHC 1ZR-FE Dual VVT-i engine, 6-speed manual, same specifications and features with the 1.6 CNG model with the removal of CNG kits, with the inclusion of adjustable seatbelts, power mirrors with retractable function, integrated AM/FM radio with CD, MP3 and WMA player and Auxiliary input, gray Fabric seats, colour-keyed door handles, Toyota Vehicle Security System (TVSS) with auto alarm function on 1.6J Automatic model.

Marketed as Corolla Altis:

- 1.6 E CNG – 1.6 litre DOHC 3ZZ-FE Advanced CNG VVT-i engine, 4-speed automatic transmission with Super ECT, same specifications and features with the 1.6J model with the inclusion of CNG kits, including power mirrors with retractable function, beige Fabric seats and Toyota Vehicle Security System (TVSS) with auto alarm function.
- 1.6 G – 1.6 litre DOHC 1ZR-FE Dual VVT-i engine, 4-speed automatic transmission with Super ECT, same specifications and features as the 1.6E CNG with the removal of CNG kits, inclusion of Audio Controls on the steering wheel, Anti-lock Braking System (ABS) with Electronic Brake-force Distribution (EBD) and Dual SRS airbags.
- 1.8 E – 1.8 litre DOHC 2ZR-FBE Dual VVT-i Flexi-fuel engine, 7-speed Super CVT-i transmission with Super ECT (Sequential-type), same features as the 1.6G with the inclusion of automatic climate control, rear centre armrest, front foglamps.
- 1.8 G – 1.8 litre DOHC 2ZR-FBE Dual VVT-i Flexi-fuel engine, 7-speed Super CVT-i transmission with Super ECT (Sequential-type), 4-spoke leather wrapped steering wheel with wood accents, same specifications and features as 1.8E trim with the inclusion of optitron gauge instrument cluster, integrated AM/FM radio with CD, MP3 and WMA player that is capable of playing 6 CDs and Auxiliary input, genuine beige leather seats, 60/40 split-folding rear seats, standard projector-type Headlamps, Cruise Control, Vehicle Stability Control (VSC) and Traction Control (TRC) and 16-inch alloy rims.
- 1.8 G Navi – 1.8 litre DOHC 2ZR-FBE Dual VVT-i Flexi-fuel engine, 7-speed Super CVT-i transmission with Super ECT (Sequential-type), 4-spoke leather wrapped black steering wheel, same specifications and features as 1.8G trim with the inclusion of Touchscreen display audio with built-in Navigation System.
- 1.8 TRD Sportivo – 1.8 litre DOHC 2ZR-FBE Dual VVT-i engine, 7-speed Super CVT-i transmission with Super ECT (Sequential-type), same features as 1.8G trim with the inclusion of Rear spoiler, side skirts, front and rear skirts, black fabric seats and other TRD-Branded accessories.
- 2.0 V – 2.0 litre DOHC 3ZR-FE VVT-i engine, 7-speed Super CVT-i transmission with Super ECT (Sequential-type), same specifications and features as 1.8G trim with the inclusion of Advanced Toyota Vehicle Security System (TVSS) with Smart Keyless entry system and engine Start-Stop button, 6-way Power-adjustable front drivers seat, black leather seats, xenon-type HID headlamps with manual leveling mode and Rear Spoiler.
- 2.0 V Navi – 2.0 litre DOHC 3ZR-FE VVT-i engine, 7-speed Super CVT-i transmission with Super ECT (Sequential-type), same specifications and features as 2.0V trim with the inclusion of Touchscreen display audio with built-in Navigation System and 4-way Power-adjustable front passenger seat.

=== North America ===
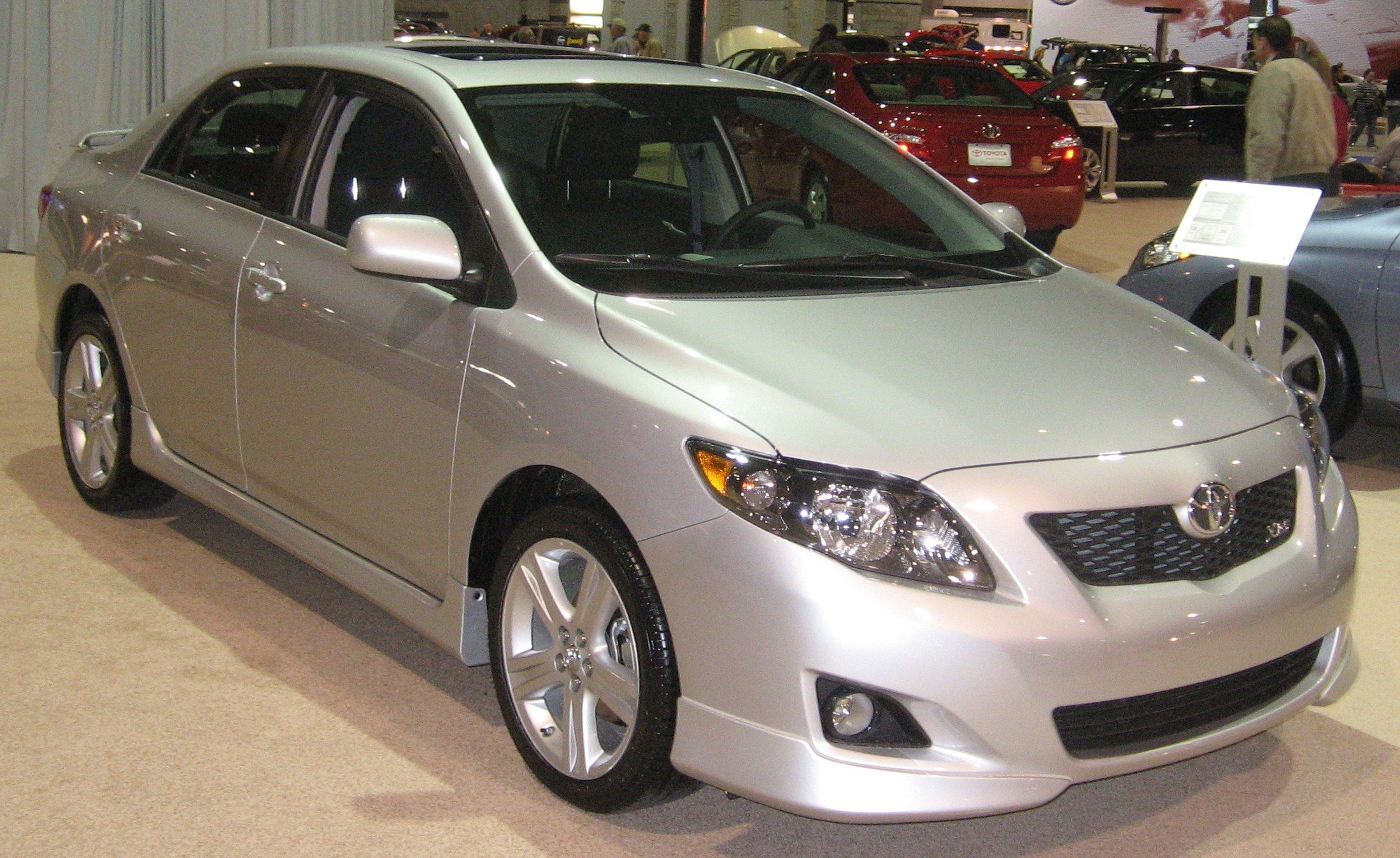
Corolla XRS (US; pre-facelift)

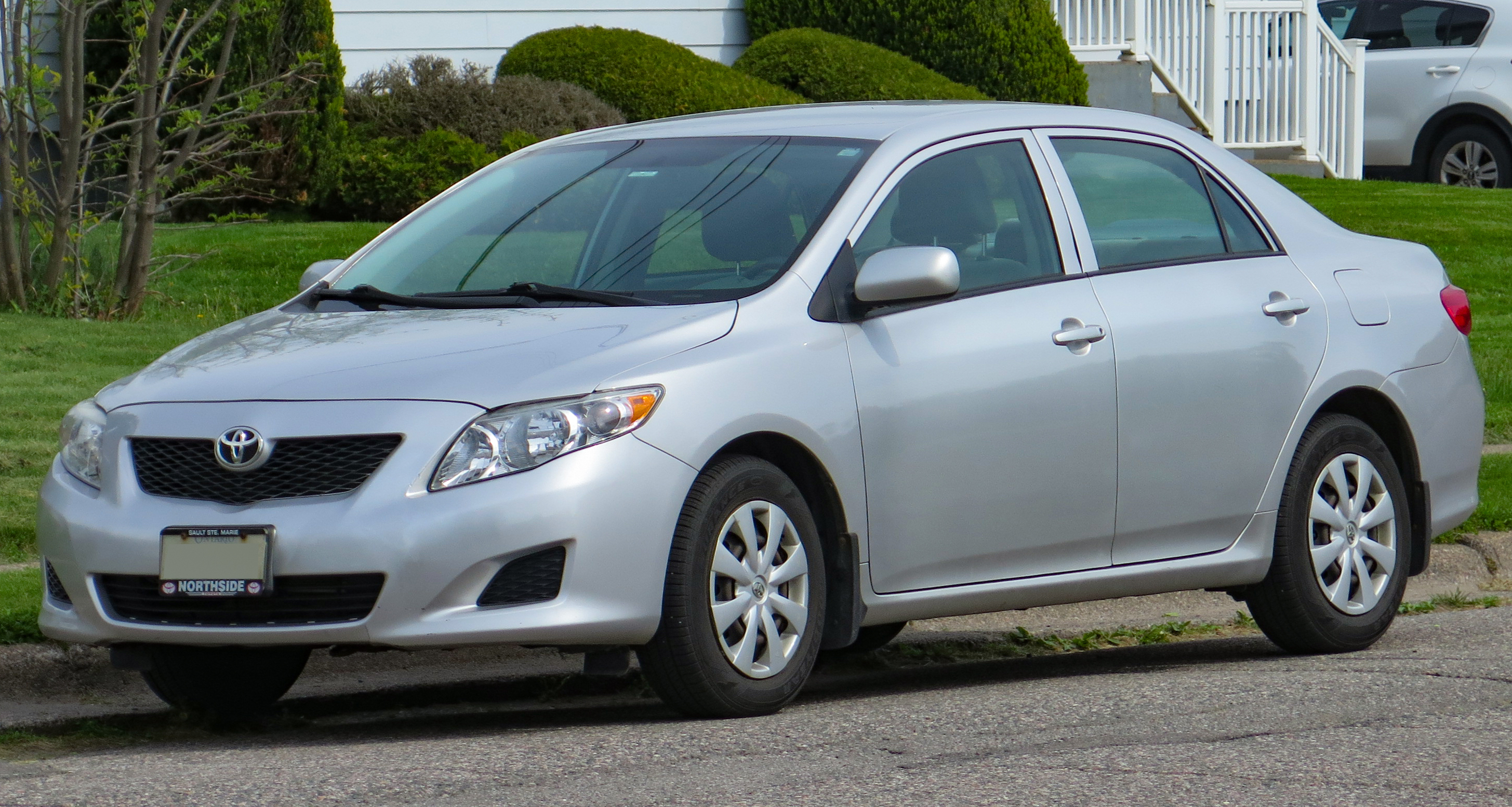

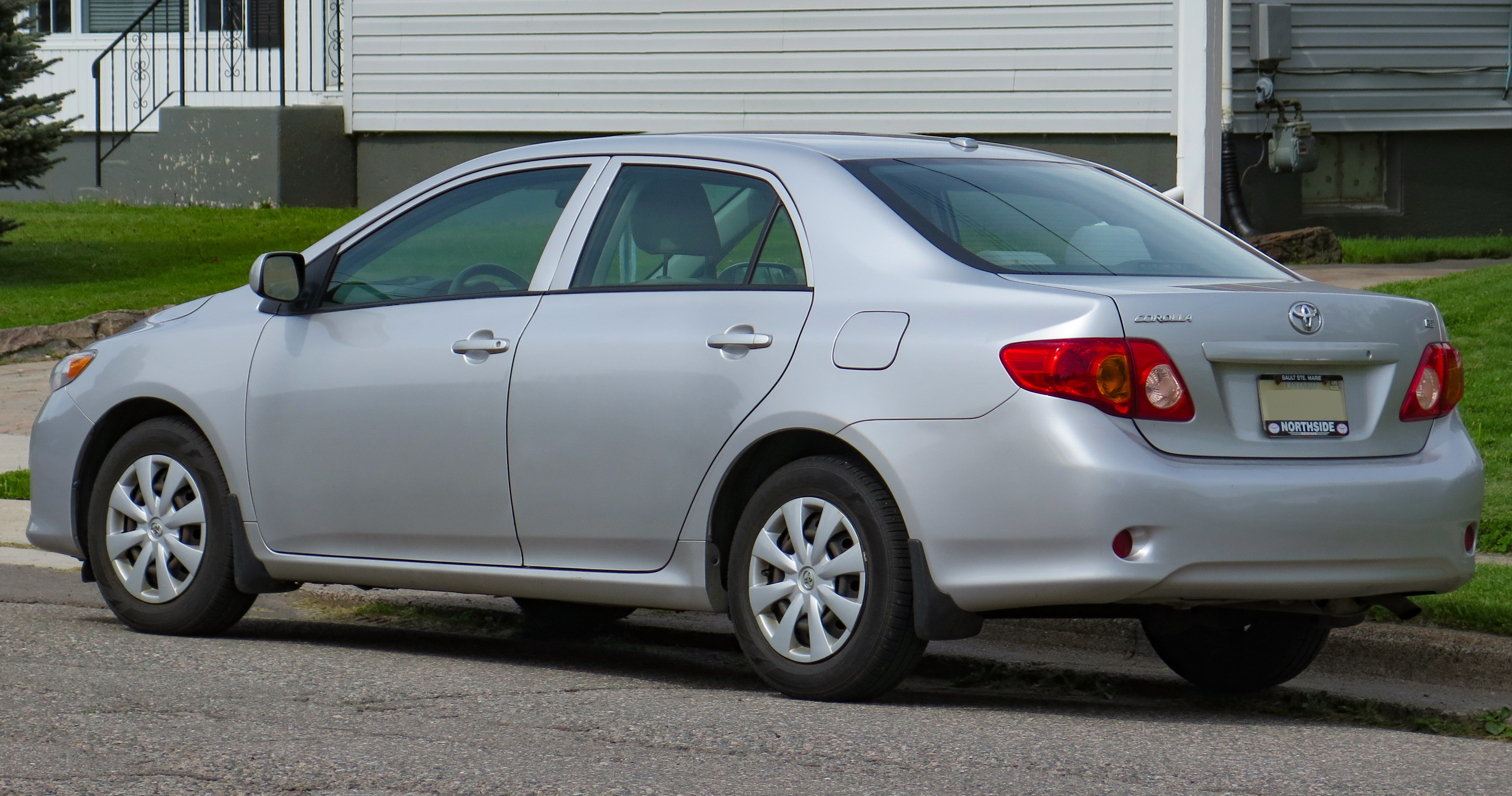
Corolla CE (Canada; pre-facelift)

The North American Corolla (E140) has a completely different exterior design from the Japanese Corolla Axio, and instead retains the ASEAN-marketed Corolla Altis design. This Corolla was unveiled on 31 October 2007, at the SEMA show in Las Vegas, started production in November 2007 and became available in US dealerships in January 2008, as a 2009 model. Only the saloon is sold, although the second generation Corolla Matrix (commonly referred to as just "Matrix"), which shares the E140 platform and engines, is considered the Corolla's hatchback counterpart.

The new Corolla has similar styling cues to its bigger brother, the Toyota Camry, while also having styling commonality with its little brother, the Yaris. Overall driving dynamics have been improved compared to its predecessor through the use of a new Electronic Power Steering system as well as an upgraded suspension and improved chassis. The interior quality has been improved through the use of new materials and the addition of more room for passengers. Reviewers note that the Corolla represents a gradual evolution over the previous iteration, without straying too far from the formula as a plain but reliable, fuel-efficient, simple and inexpensive form of transportation.

A total of five trim levels (Standard, S, LE, XLE and XRS) are being offered in the US, Canada has 4 trim levels (CE, LE, Sport (or S) and XRS). The LE and S have a similar MSRP and are very similar mechanically, the main differences being the S's spoiler, underskirts and silver interior highlights. The XRS also has a spoiler and underskirts like the S, but it has a larger 2.4 L engine, rear disc brakes, a sport-tuned suspension, and standard stability and traction control.

The base (standard and CE) and S trims are available with either a five-speed manual or four-speed automatic transmission, while the LE (unlike the previous generation) and XLE are automatic only. The XRS grade is equipped with the 2.4-litre 2AZ-FE I4 engine, the same one used in the Camry, good for 158 hp (118 kW) and 162 lb⋅ft (220 N⋅m) of torque, with a choice of five-speed manual or five-speed automatic transmissions. The XRS takes 7.9 seconds to 60 mph (97 km/h) and 16.0 seconds for the quarter-mile. All other trims have Toyota's new 1.8-litre 2ZR-FE four-cylinder engine with 132 horsepower (98 kW) and 128 pound-feet (174 N⋅m) of torque. Corollas with the 1.8-litre engine have an EPA fuel economy rating of 27 mpg city/35 mpg highway. The 2.4-litre is rated at 22 mpg/30 mpg with the automatic and 22 mpg/29 mpg with the manual. All engines are ULEV II certified. Toyota carried over the 13.2 gal fuel tank from earlier models. In order to help improve fuel economy, the new Corolla uses an electric-power-steering unit instead of a belt-driven-hydraulic pump.

Engines
Model years	Displacement (Engine Model)	Power	Torque	Transmission(s)
2009–2010	2.4-litre (2,362 cc) I4 (2AZ-FE)	158 hp (118 kW) at 6000 rpm	162 lb⋅ft (220 N⋅m) at 4000 rpm	5-speed Manual; 5-speed Automatic
2009–2013	1.8-litre (1,798 cc) I4 (2ZR-FE)	132 hp (98 kW) at 6000 rpm	128 lb⋅ft (174 N⋅m) at 4400 rpm	5-speed Manual; 4-speed Automatic

The Corolla offers technological conveniences such as an auxiliary audio jack for MP3 players, upgraded JBL audio, tilt/telescopic steering wheel, steering wheel-mounted audio controls, a purse hook, and a hands-free Bluetooth mobile phone system. Traction control and Vehicle Stability Control (VSC) are standard on the top-of-the-line XRS, and are available as options on the US market LE and XLE trims.

In 2009 (2010 US model year vehicles), S models received the Optitron XRS gauges as standard equipment and new 16-inch steel wheel cover designs. XLE models were now available with an optional automatic climate control and a metallic finish to the steering wheel panels. All models now have The Star Safety System includes Vehicle Stability Control (VSC), Traction Control (TRAC), Anti-lock Braking System (ABS), Electronic Brake-force Distribution (EBD), Brake Assist (BA) and Smart Stop Technology brake override system as standard equipment.

In Mexico, the Corolla is offered in three trim levels: LE which comes standard with 16-inch steel wheels and wheel covers and with both manual and automatic transmission, then the mid-range XLE now comes with 16-inch alloy wheels and wood inserts in the interior and it is only available with an automatic transmission, and the XRS with the 2.4-litre 2AZ-FE I4 engine. The Mexican-spec Corolla is built at the Cambridge plant in Ontario. Canada, Mexico and the US are the only countries that receive the Corolla from this assembly plant.

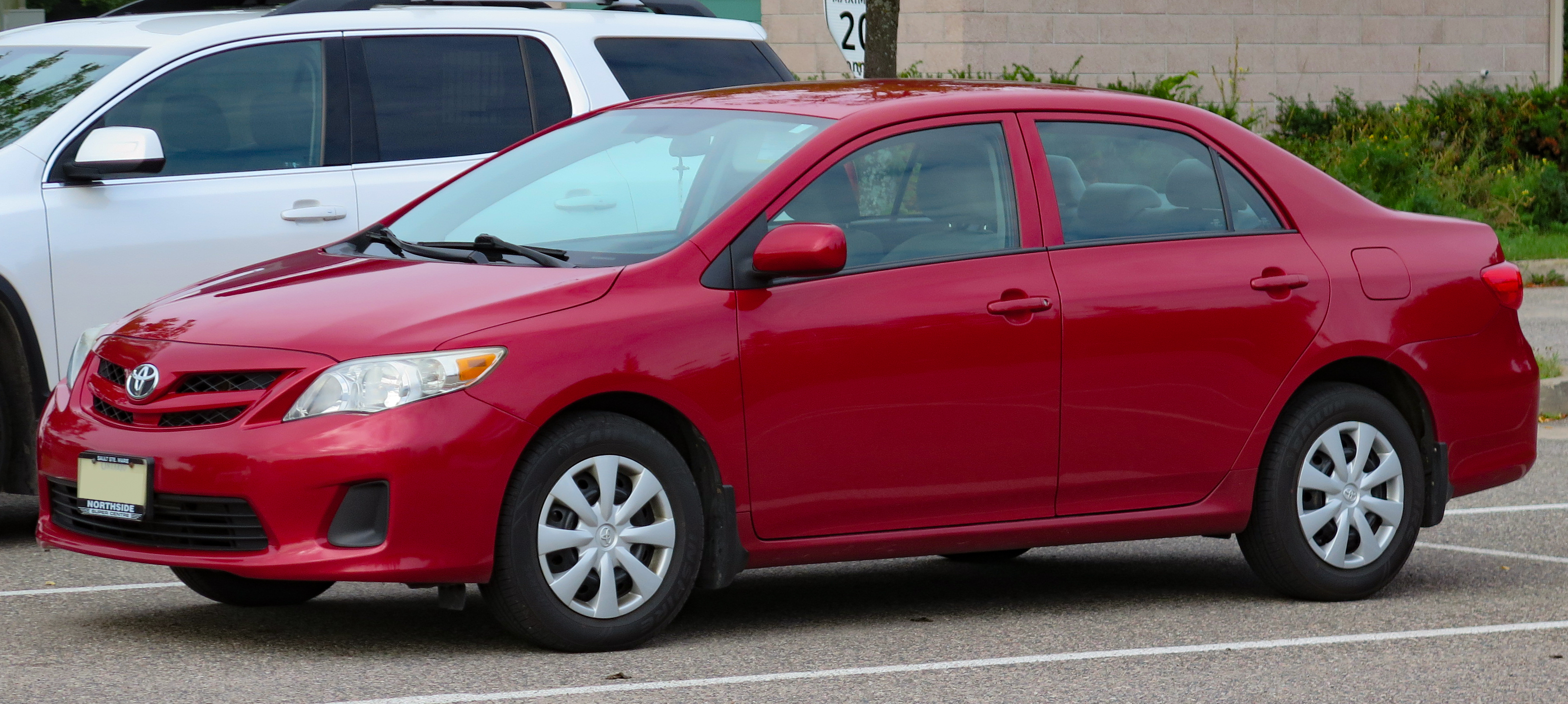

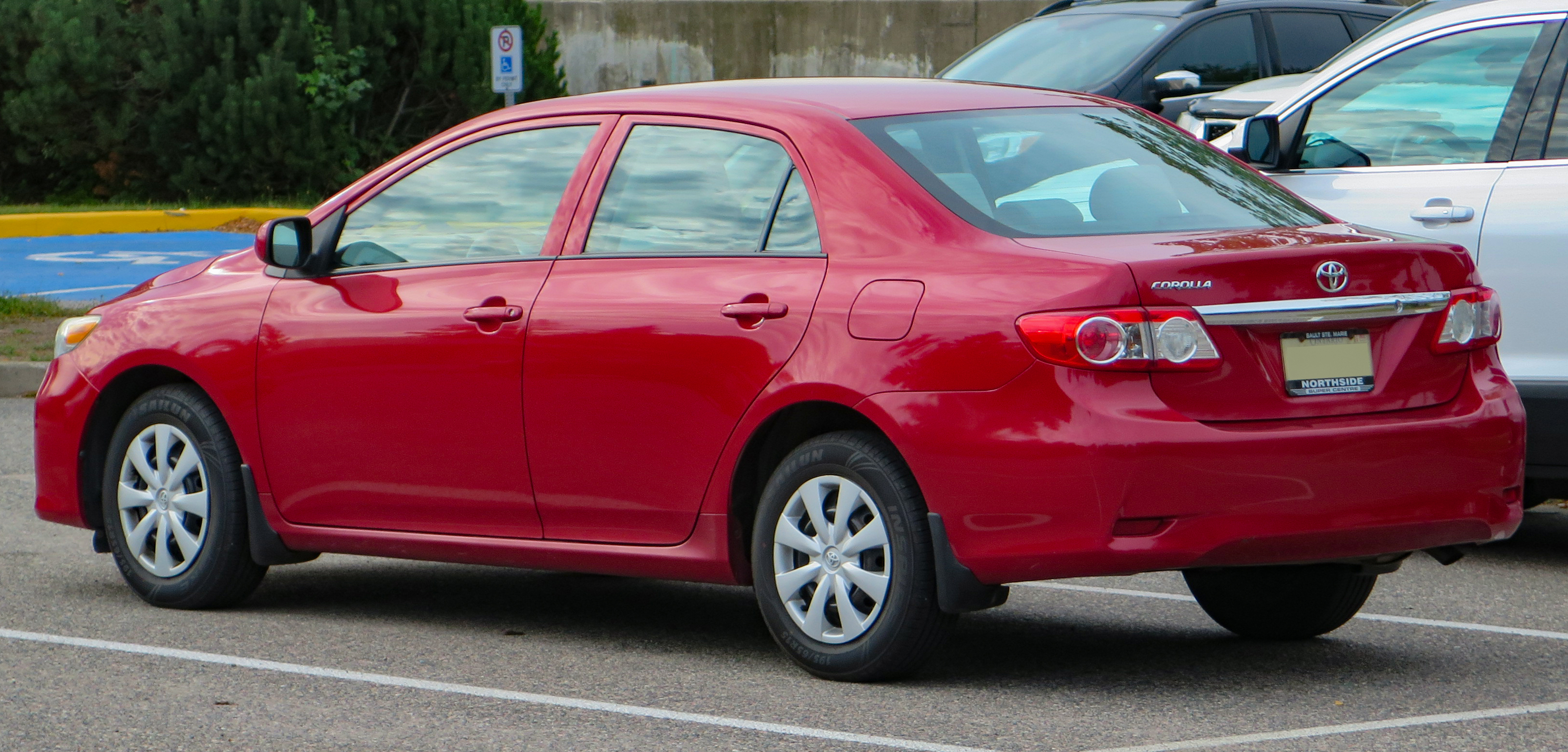
Corolla CE (Canada; facelift)

For the 2011 model year, the XRS and XLE trims were discontinued for the US market (XRS is still available in Canada and Mexico). The revised Corolla features new front and rear exterior styling and interior design changes, including a redesigned front grille, headlights, front and rear bumpers, new wheel designs, rear chrome garnish, rear combination lamps and boot lid. The interior adds a metallic trim (LE and S trims), new fabrics and a sport tilt/telescopic steering wheel (S grade). Corolla also features two new colours, Nautical Blue Metallic and Sandy Beach Metallic. New standard features for the LE trim include cruise control, Remote Keyless Entry, two additional audio speakers and variable intermittent windshield wipers with a mist cycle. The S trim adds standard cruise control, Remote Keyless Entry, 16-inch alloy wheels and a colour-keyed rear deck spoiler.

In 2011 (for the 2012 model year), the Corolla received a few feature upgrades, including a new standard audio system with the USB port, Bluetooth and steering audio controls for the US and Canadian LE trim. The US Corolla L received power windows, power door locks and remote keyless entry.

The Corolla comes standard with dual front airbags, front and rear row side curtain airbags and front row side torso airbags. ABS and active headrests are also standard. Beginning in 2009 (2010 model year), Toyota's Vehicle Stability Control and traction control became standard on all trims.

U.S. NHTSA crash test ratings (2009)
Frontal Driver:	4/5 stars
Frontal Passenger:	4/5 stars
Side Driver:	5/5 stars
Side Rear Passenger:	4/5 stars
Rollover:	4/5 stars

The Insurance Institute for Highway Safety gave the Corolla its Top Safety Pick accolade. The Corolla earned a Good overall score in the front impact crash test, with Good marks in all six measured front impact categories. And the Corolla received another Good overall score for the side impact crash test. The Corolla nearly earned perfect marks in all nine measured side impact test categories but was given an Average score for rear passenger pelvis/leg protection. However the Corolla earned a Good rating in the side impact structure/safety category which is uncommon in compact car segment.

Certain 2009 to 2010 model year Toyota Corollas (mainly US-built models with VIN# beginning in "1NX" or "2T1") were subject to the 2010 Toyota vehicle recalls regarding floor mat and accelerator pedal replacement.

On 10 October 2012, Toyota issued a recall for 2009 model year Corolla and Matrix, along with ten other models. The recall notices stated that improperly lubricated driver's side power window master switch may develop a “notchy” or sticky feel, and that improper aftermarket lubrication may present a fire hazard. The repair involves lubricating the switch assembly with a special fluorine grease.

=== Latin America ===
The tenth generation Corolla was launched in Brazil on 26 March 2008, and in Argentina in April 2008. It was produced in Brazil with two engines (a 1.6 and a 1.8-litre petrol engine – petrol/ethanol in Brazil) and three models: the base XLi, the intermediate XEi and the higher spec SE-G.

The 2.0 VVT-i Flex was added in March 2010. All versions are based on the wide-body saloon.

Bolivia

The Toyota Corolla E150 made in Japan is sold in Bolivia by Toyota Bolivia. Grey imports allow sale in Bolivia US Spec from USA/Canada and Corolla Axio from Japan.

Jamaica

The tenth generation Corolla went on sale in Jamaica in October 2007. It is available in 1.5L and 1.8L models. The 1.5L breaks down into two models; the first of which comes without alloy wheels and fog lamps and the other with alloy wheels and fog lamps. The 1.8L model however, comes standard with leather interior and a sunroof. All models feature 4-wheel anti-lock disc brakes.

==== Safety ====
The Corolla XEI with 2 airbags for Latin America received 4 stars for adult occupants and 1 star for toddlers from Latin NCAP in 2010.

Latin NCAP 1.0 test results Toyota Corolla XEI + 2 Airbags (2010, based on Euro NCAP 1997)
Test	Points	Stars
Adult occupant:	13.60/17.0	4 /5 stars
Child occupant:	12.68/49.00	1 /5 stars

== E150 wide-body ==
The E150 version appears identical to the E140 wide-body, but has a subtle difference in the front and rear fender panel lines between the front and rear wheel arc region. Its chassis has a different, more sophisticated underpinnings based on the New MC platform. The global debut of the international variant of the tenth generation Corolla was staged in November 2006 at the Beijing Auto Show.

=== China ===
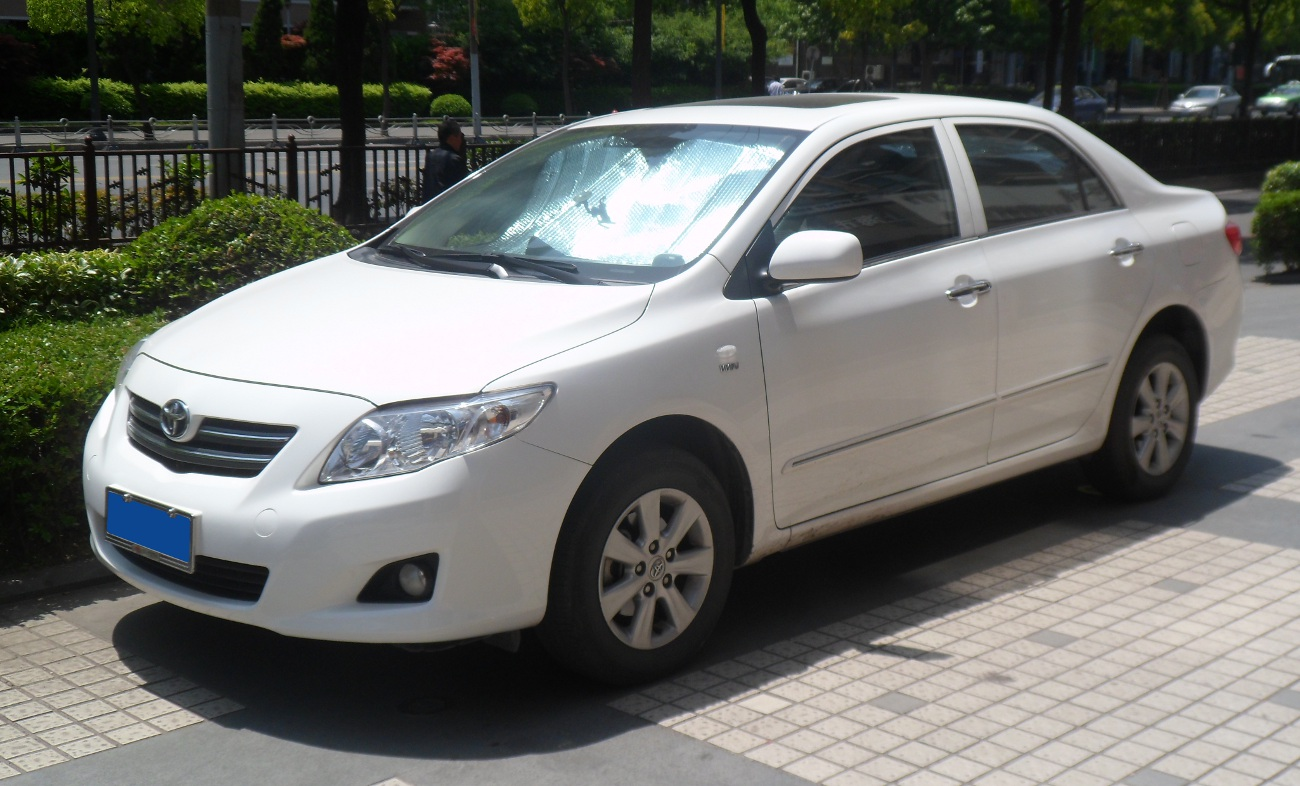
Toyota Corolla (China; pre-facelift)

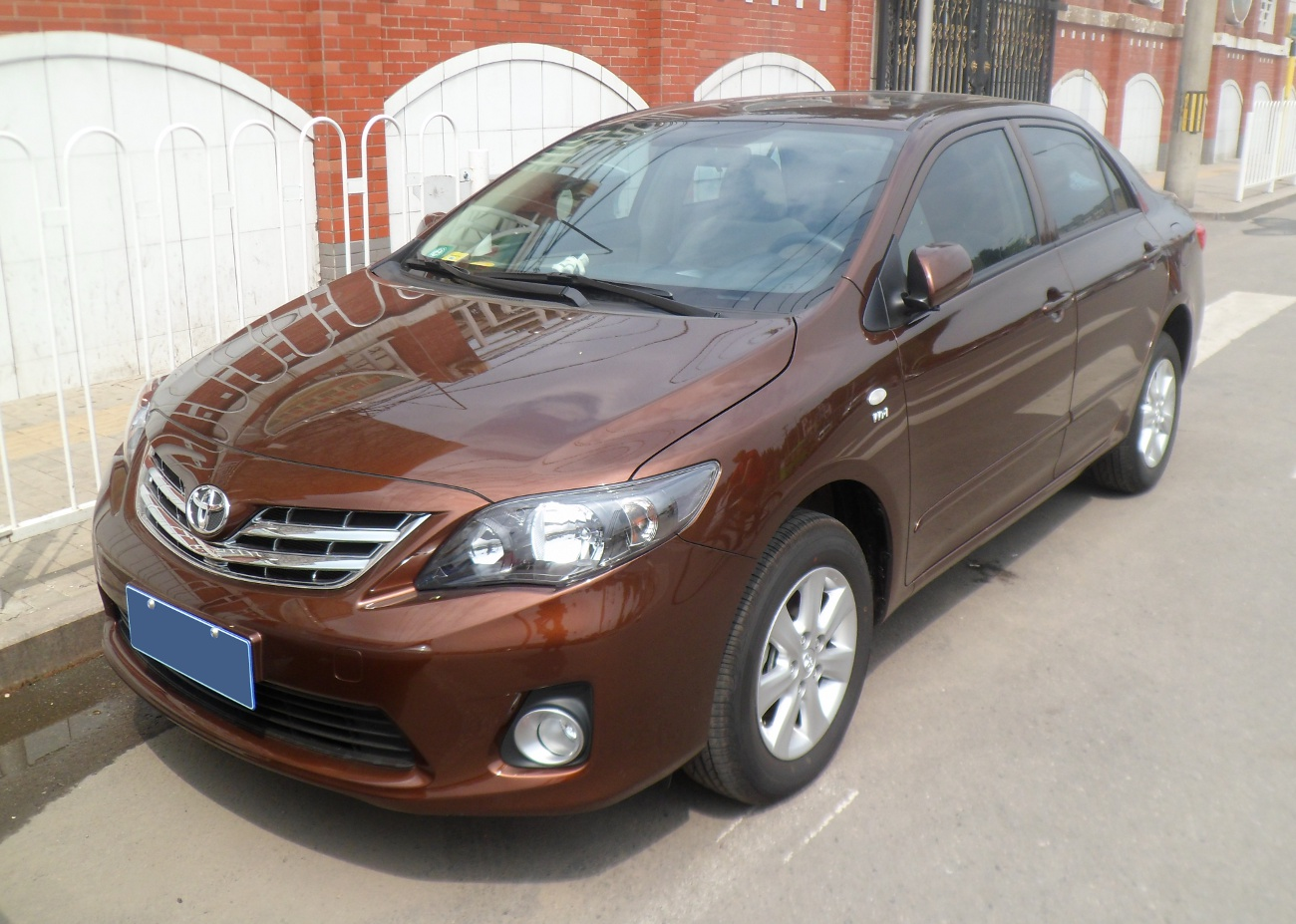
Toyota Corolla (China; facelift)

The Corolla E150 was launched at the 2006 Beijing Auto Show and commenced production in 2007. It was built at its plant in Tianjin, and the facelift arrived in September 2010 for the 2011 model year. Engine and gearbox choices available were the 1.6-litre 1ZR-FE, 1.8 litre 2ZR-FE and the 2.0-litre 3ZR-FE paired with the 5-speed manual and 4 speed-automatic for the 1.6 GL models while the 6-speed manual and CVT gearboxes were standard on 1.8GL, 1.8GLX and 2.0GLX models. Pricing ranged between 131,800 yuan and 199,800 yuan (US$25,730–$39,000). Production ended in June 2014 when the Toyota Corolla (E180) replaced it.

=== Africa ===
South Africa

This generation of the Corolla was launched in South Africa in September 2007. Unlike in some countries, Corolla mainly refers to the saloon and not the hatchback, which in South Africa is known as the Toyota Auris. This generation is lower and wider than its predecessor. Toyota South Africa Motors achieved a new all-time sales record for the South African motor industry in October 2007 with the Corolla (including Auris) leading the vehicle sales chart.

Toyota's manufacturing plant in Durban provides the Corolla, Hilux and Fortuner model exports to Europe. The European-spec Corolla made in Durban has been awarded a EURO NCAP 5-star rating (applies to all models in the range with knee airbags).

The car is available in the following models: 2.0 Diesel (Exclusive, Advanced); 1.8 Petrol (Exclusive, Exclusive Auto, Advanced); 1.6 Petrol (Advanced, Professional); and 1.4 Petrol (Advanced, Professional).

From the start of June 2014 the Corolla was re-launched as the Corolla Quest, which is a scaled-down model with less features as to target the entry level class B buyers. The Quest has been released with 1.6-litre engine in both 6-speed manual and 4-speed automatic transmissions.

=== Australasia ===
Australia

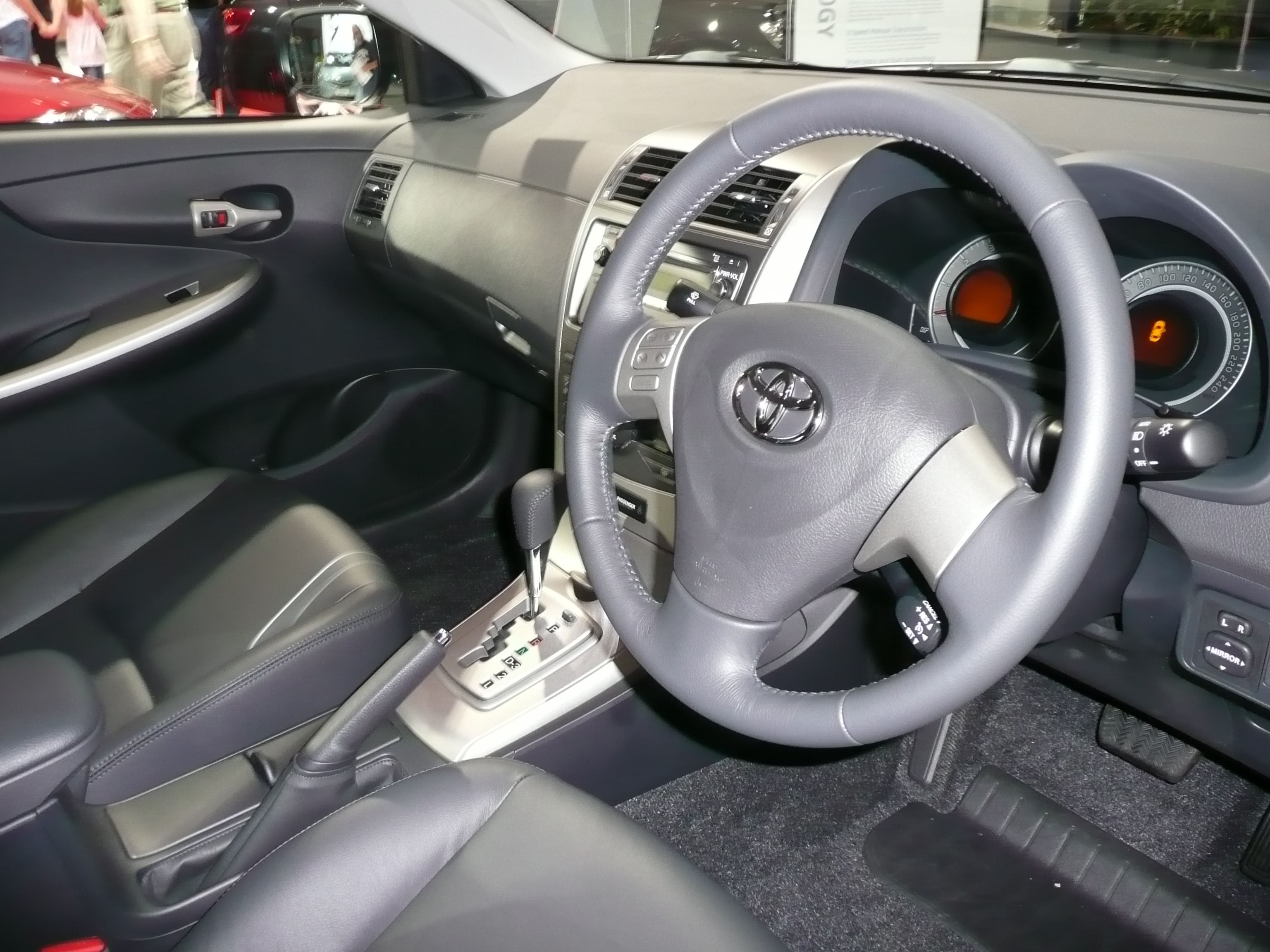
Interior

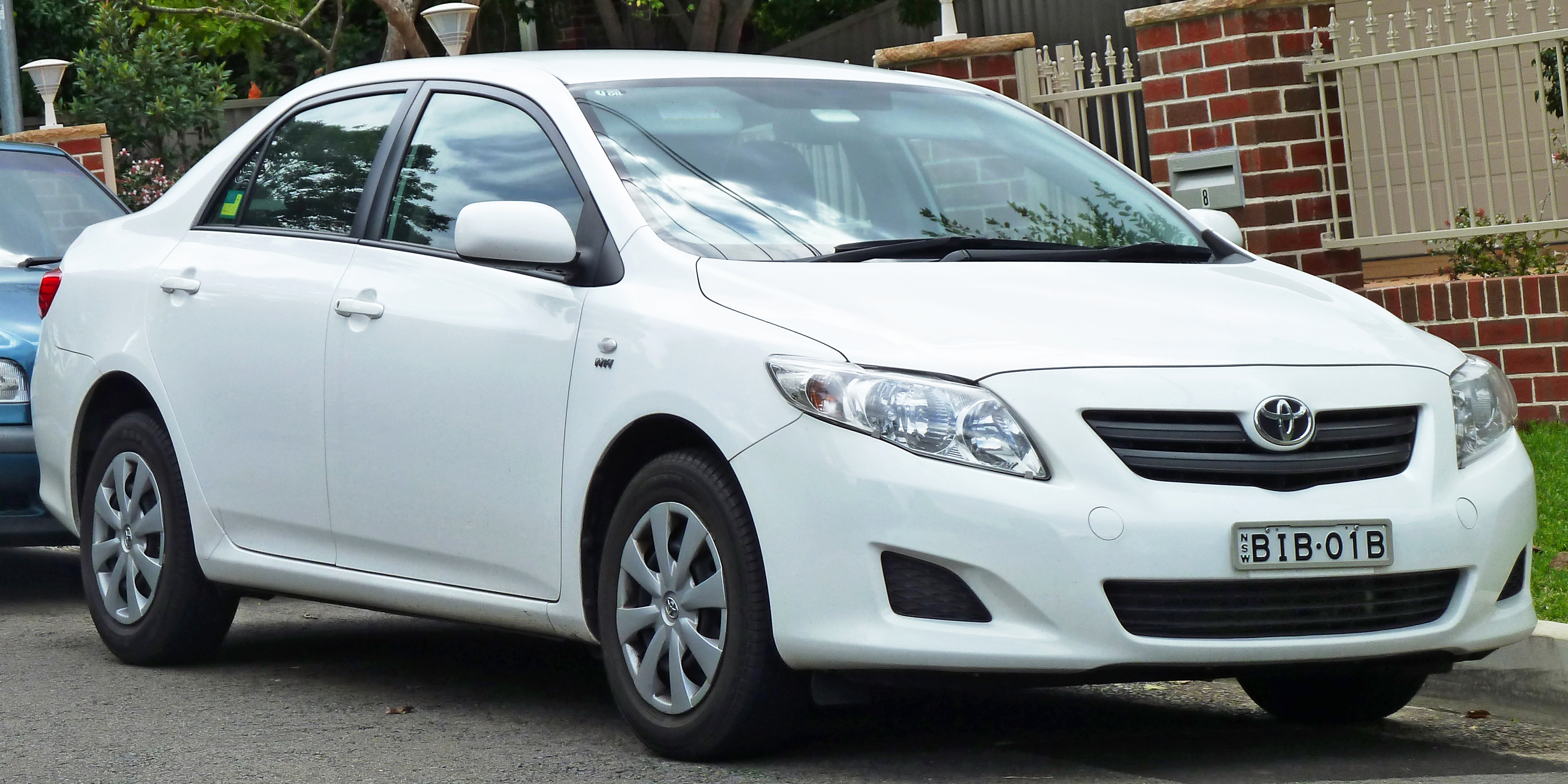
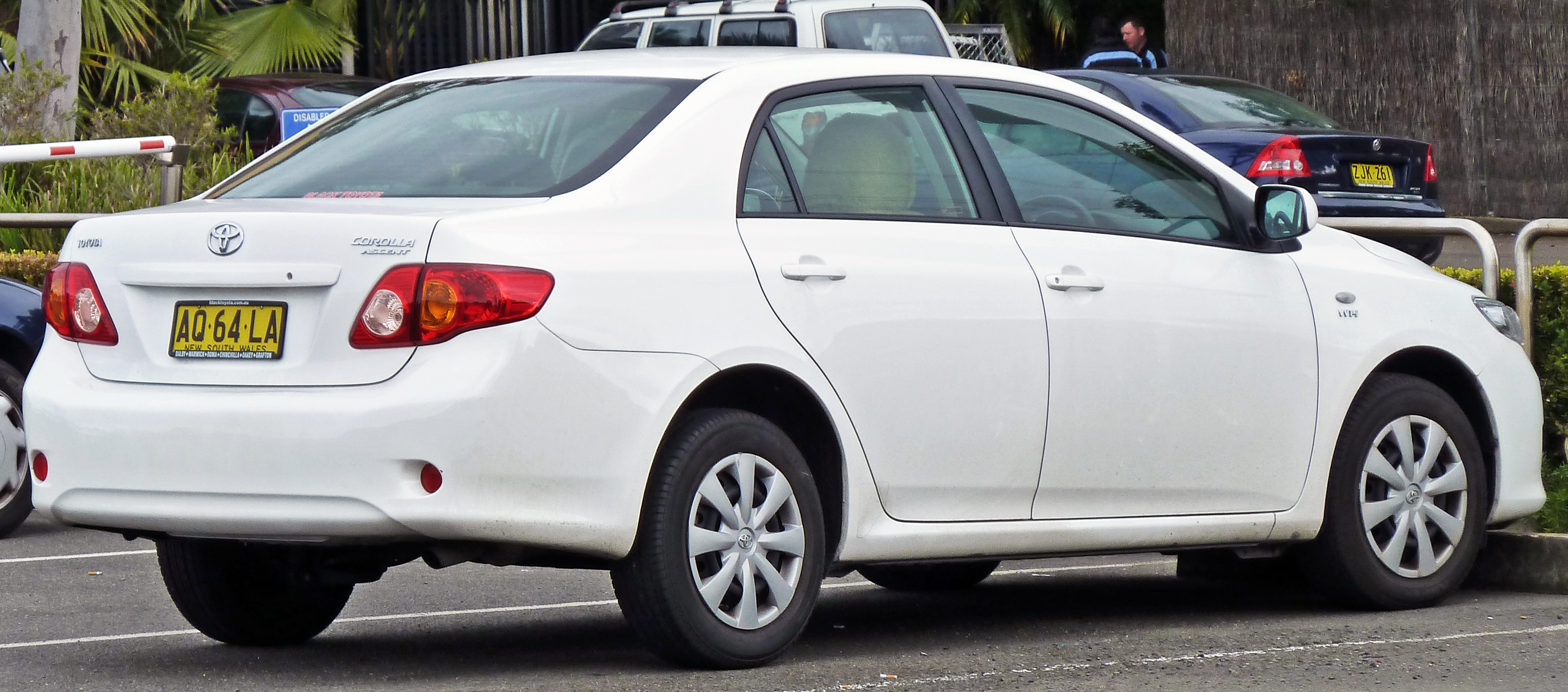
Corolla Ascent saloon (Australia; pre-facelift)
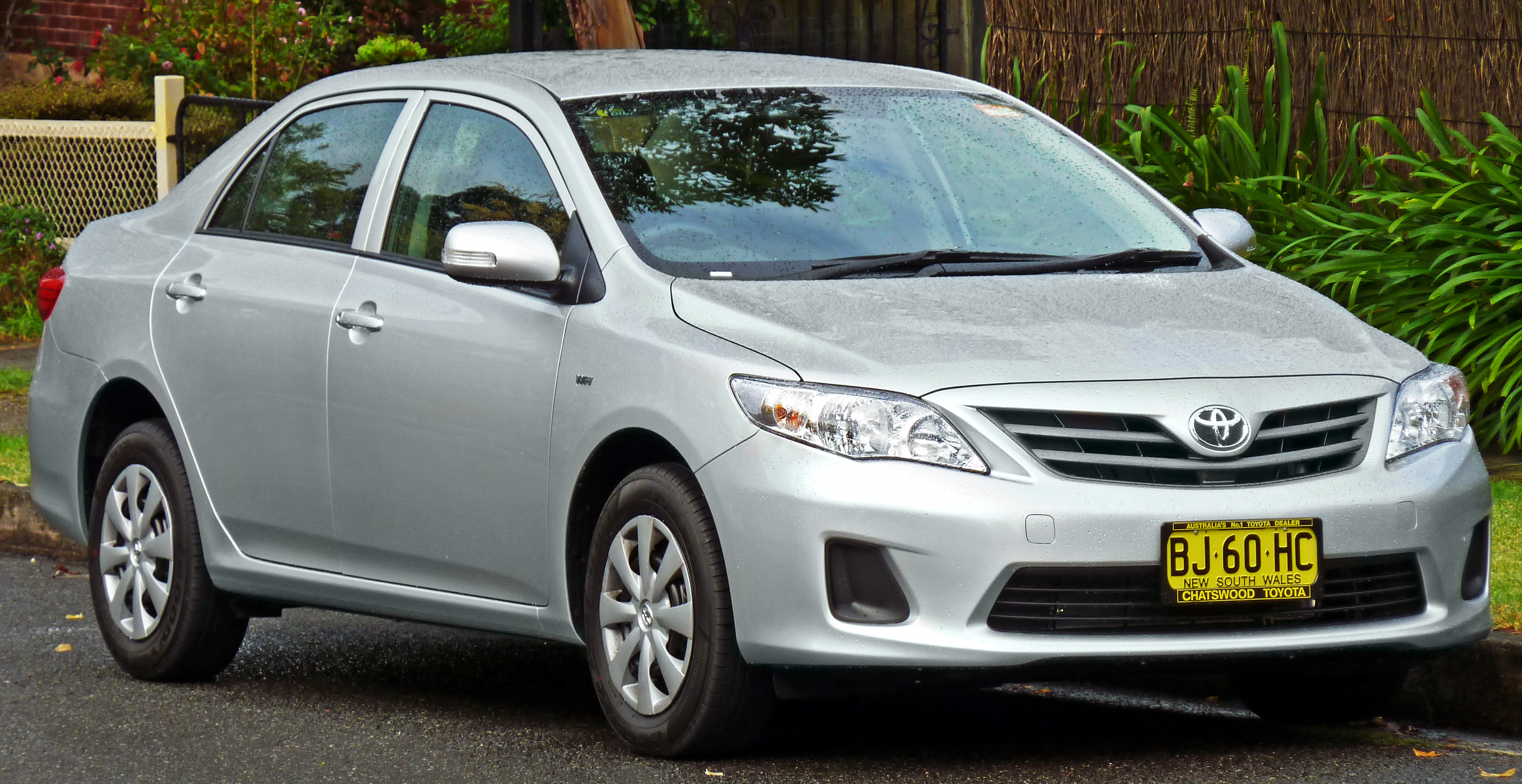
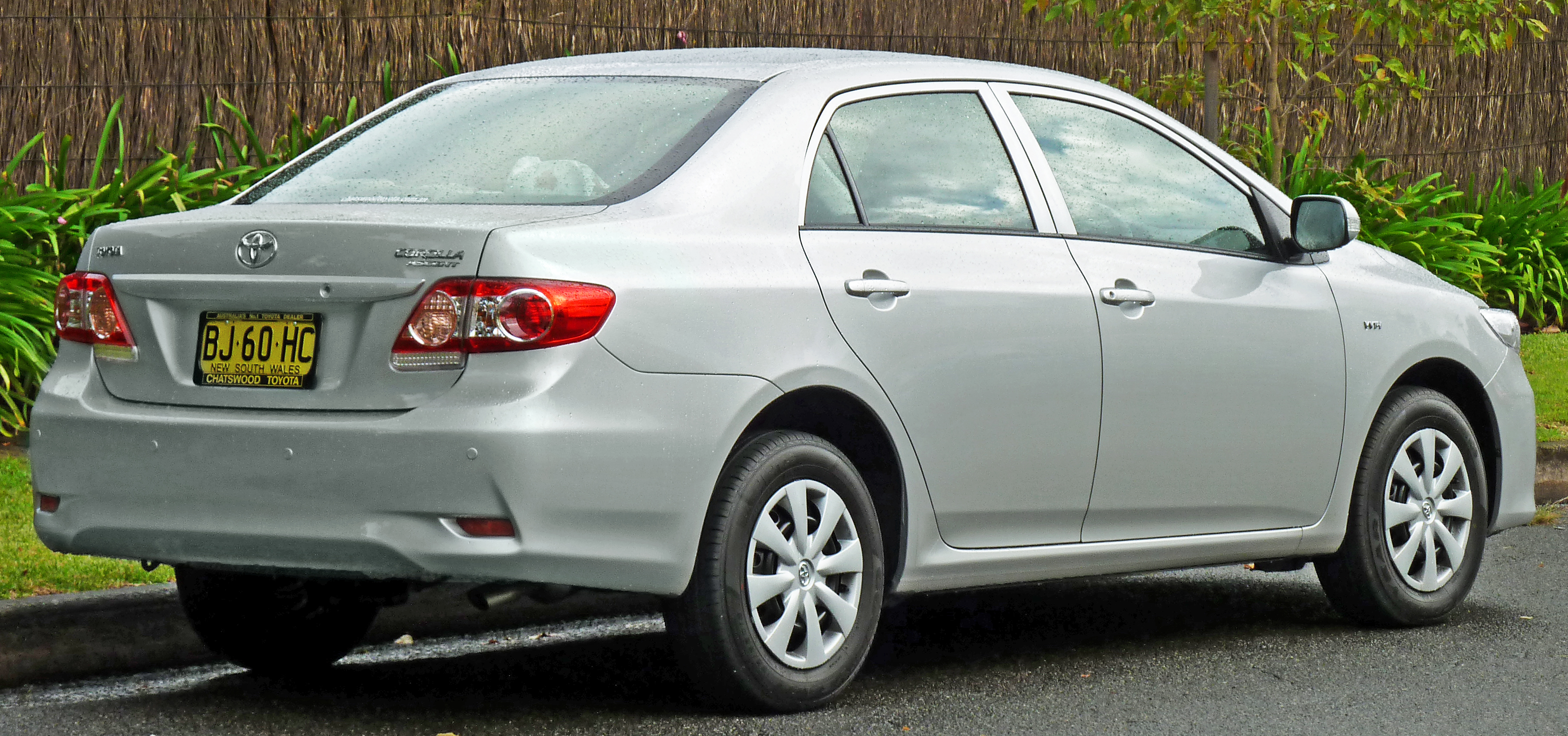
Corolla Ascent saloon (Australia; facelift)
Rebadged E150 Auris
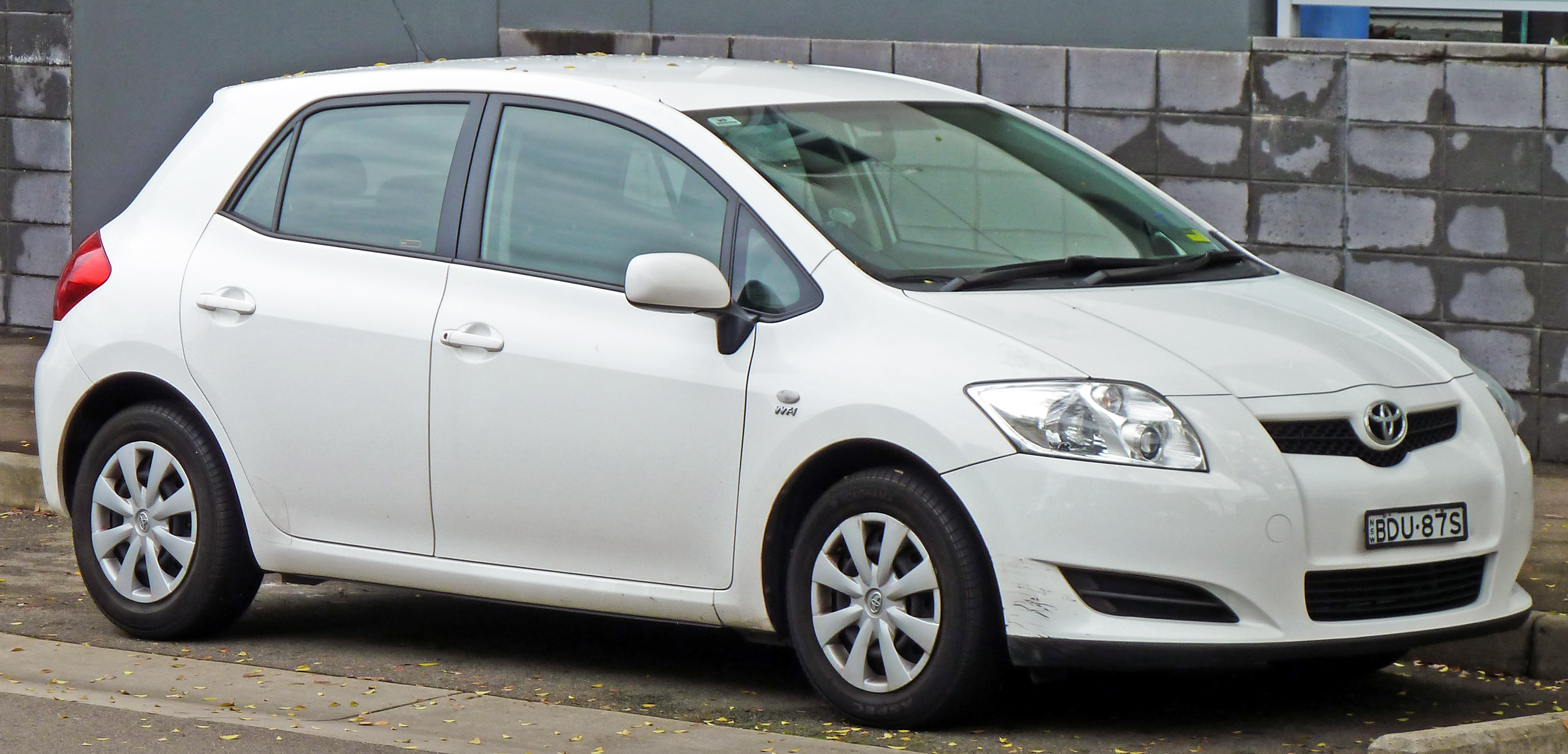
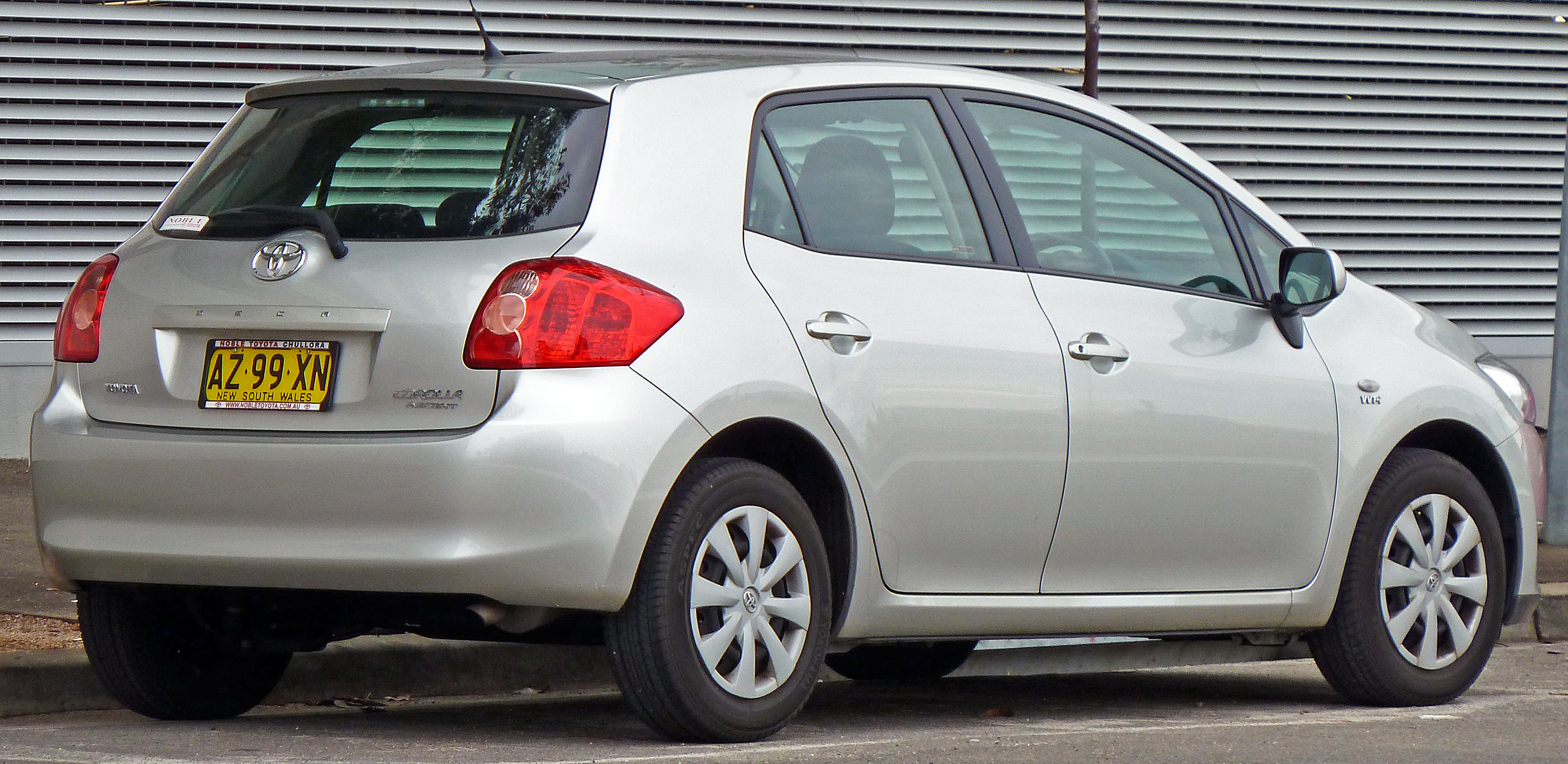
Corolla Ascent hatchback (Australia; pre-facelift)
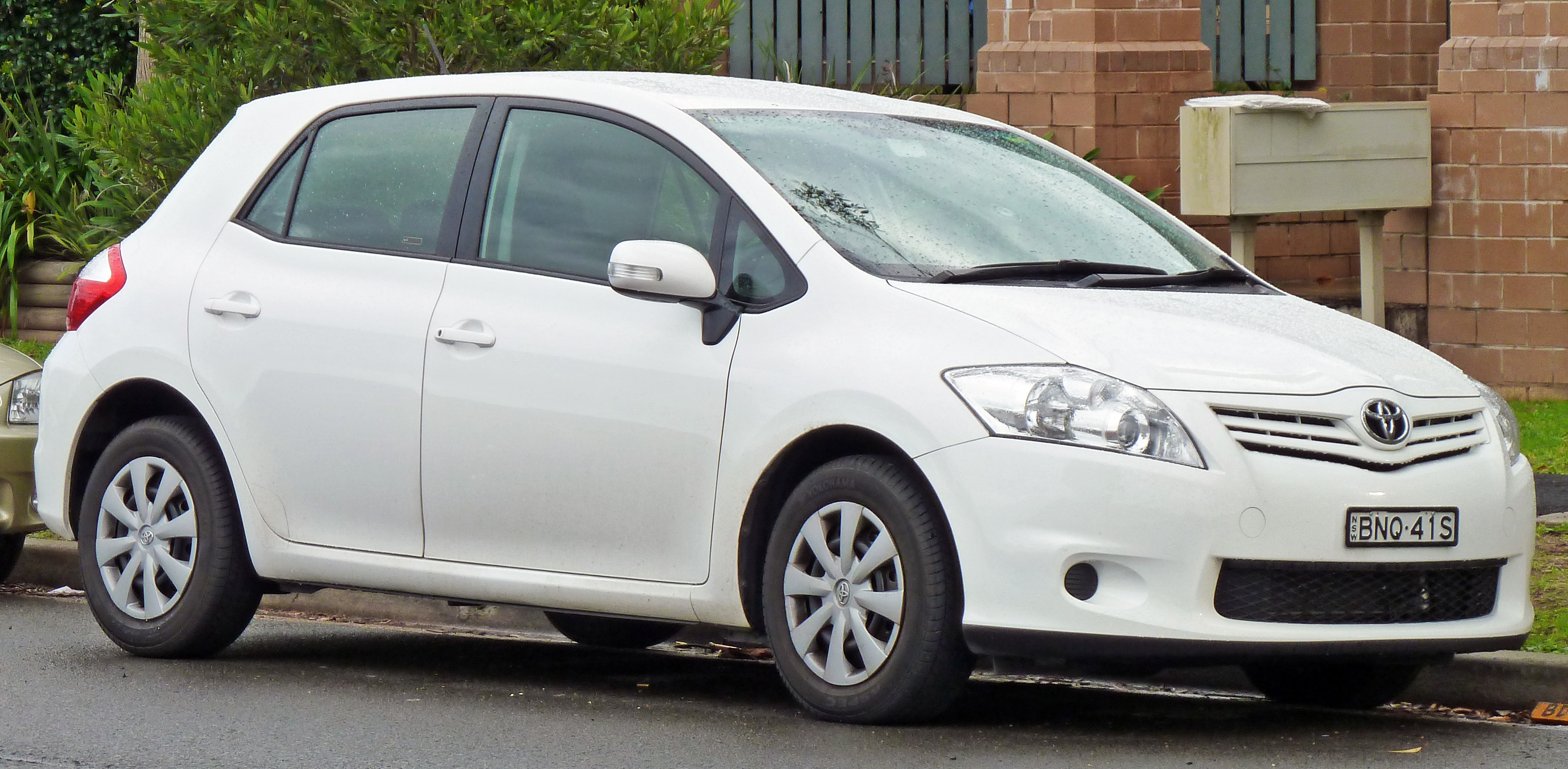
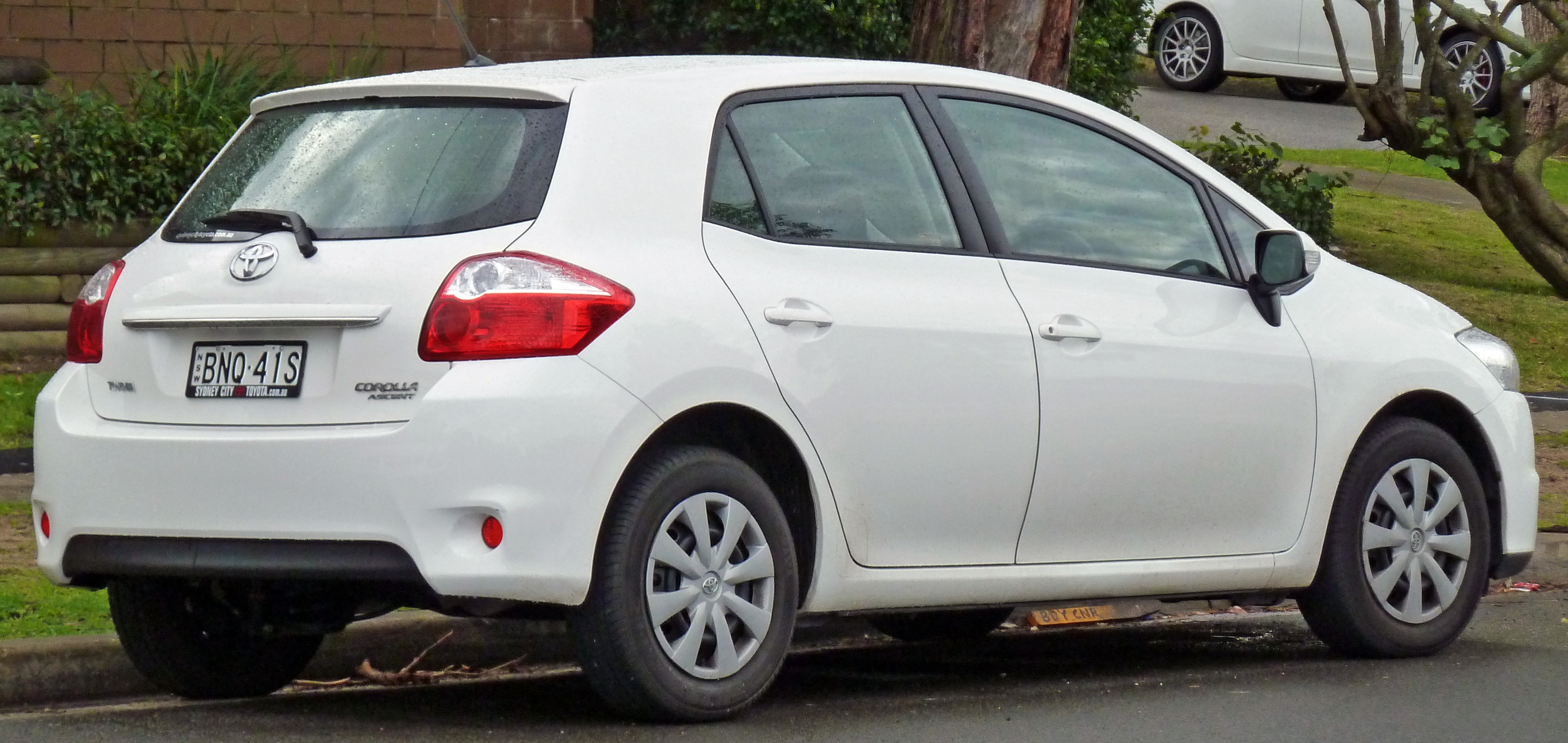
Corolla Ascent hatchback (Australia; facelift)

The new Corolla was introduced to the Australian market on 18 May 2007. It was available in both saloon and hatchback models, with added safety features. The new 1.8-litre 2ZR-FE Dual VVT-i - with variable valve timing for both intake and exhaust camshafts - was the only engine available for the Australian model. It promised better fuel economy than its predecessor whilst retaining its 100 kW power output. The previous model's 1.8-litre four-cylinder engine figures dropped to 93 kW of power and 161 Nm of torque (from 171 Nm) in late 2005 to meet the 2006 Euro IV emissions requirements. A new 6-speed manual gearbox was available with a 4-speed automatic options.

All Australian models of Corolla ran on the E150 platform, unlike the North American and Asian versions. Therefore, certain chassis parts were not interchangeable.

The new Corolla was available in five trim levels for the hatch (Ascent, Ascent Sport, Conquest, Levin SX and Levin ZR) and four for the saloon (Ascent, Ascent Sport, Conquest and Ultima - auto only), with the Corolla estate discontinued in Australia. The Levin ZR and Ultima grade featured HID xenon headlamps, rain sensing wipers, smart entry and start system and automatic climate control. Safety equipment levels was also improved with ABS brakes and dual airbags standard across the range, whilst side, curtain, driver's knee airbag and stability and traction control was optional on Ascent and Levin SX models and standard on Conquest, Levin ZR and Ultima models from December 2008 production. Other changes from December 2008 production included a revised six-speed manual transmission across all models except the auto only Ultima saloon that had improved gear ratios and the adoption of smart entry activation on front passenger and back door on Levin ZR model. Although the new hatch was badged Auris name in most world markets, the Corolla name was retained for the Australian market.

The Ultima trim level firstly came with the 1.8 L 2ZR-FE engine for the 2007 to 2010 model years and then upgraded to the 2.0 L 3ZR-FE engine, which had DOHC, 16-valves and Dual VVT-i, available for the 2011 and 2012 model years. It produced 105 kW (141 hp) at 5600 rpm and 194.0 N⋅m (143.1 lb⋅ft; 19.8 kg⋅m) at 3900 rpm.

The Corolla received a four star ANCAP safety rating for occupant safety and a three star rating for pedestrian safety.

New Zealand

Like Australia, all models are marketed under the Corolla nameplate. The range is similar to the Australian range with the same engines and drivetrain, however, models are designated as the base GX and higher spec GLX. What distinguishes the New Zealand range from the rest of the world is the addition of the Corolla Fielder estate version, which is otherwise only seen in the Japan market. With estate cars so popular in New Zealand, demand for the previous model was enough to justify it. New Zealand is the only export market for the estate. It is marketed as the Corolla GX Wagon with the 1NZ-FE engine. While the hatch and saloon feature the 1.8-litre 2ZR-FE Dual VVT-i, the estate features the Japanese market 1.5-litre, 4-cylinder, 16-valve, DOHC VVT-i engine. It is specified lower than the GX model hatch and saloon due to the estate being aimed at the price-conscious fleet market and priced accordingly. The hatchback gained two diesel motors in June 2008, with both the 1.4 and 2.0 D4-D engines joining the local range, albeit only with manual transmissions. The diesel cars are European spec models built in Japan, the 1.4 version having its motor shipped from Europe to be placed in the New Zealand spec cars.

Toyota was widely criticised by the motoring press for selling the new Corolla in Australia and New Zealand without Electronic Stability Control, which can reduce the chances of a fatal accident by up to 55 percent. Electronic Stability Control has been available on American versions of the Corolla for several years. The stability control concern was partially addressed with the diesel Corollas offering ESC as standard. The facelift in 2010 saw the addition of the safety equipment on all models bar the Japanese-spec estate.

=== Europe ===
Euro NCAP test results Corolla (2007)
Test	Score	Rating
Adult occupant:	34	5 /5 stars
Child occupant:	39	4 /5 stars
Pedestrian:	23	3 /4 stars

In Ireland, the E150 series Corolla was launched in December 2006 for sale in January 2007. That made it one of the first countries in the world to receive this model. The saloon version is available along with the Auris (and an Auris van) with a 1.4-litre 97 bhp (72 kW) 4ZZ-FE petrol engine or a 1.4-litre 90 bhp D-4D diesel engine in Terra, Strata, Luna and Sol trim levels (estate is not available). European models are built in Turkey and Japan. Saloon versions are more popular in Ireland than the recently launched Auris.

However, British buyers were only offered the Auris, although Toyota did offer the E150 in Belgium, Luxembourg, Bulgaria and Spain.

=== Safety ===
ANCAP test results Toyota Corolla sedans with side and curtain airbags (2007)
Test	Score
Overall	5 /5 stars
Frontal offset	14.63/16
Side impact	16/16
Pole	1/2
Seat belt reminders	2/3
Whiplash protection	Not Assessed
Pedestrian protection	Adequate
Electronic stability control	Not Available

ANCAP test results Toyota Corolla all sedan variants (2011)
Test	Score
Overall	5 /5 stars
Frontal offset	14.63/16
Side impact	16/16
Pole	1/2
Seat belt reminders	2/3
Whiplash protection	Good
Pedestrian protection	Adequate
Electronic stability control	Standard

Preceded by Corolla (E120/E130)	Toyota Corolla (E140/150); 2006–2020	Succeeded by Corolla (E170/E180); Corolla (E160) (Japan)
