= Toyota Corolla (E170) =

Toyota Corolla (E170/E180)
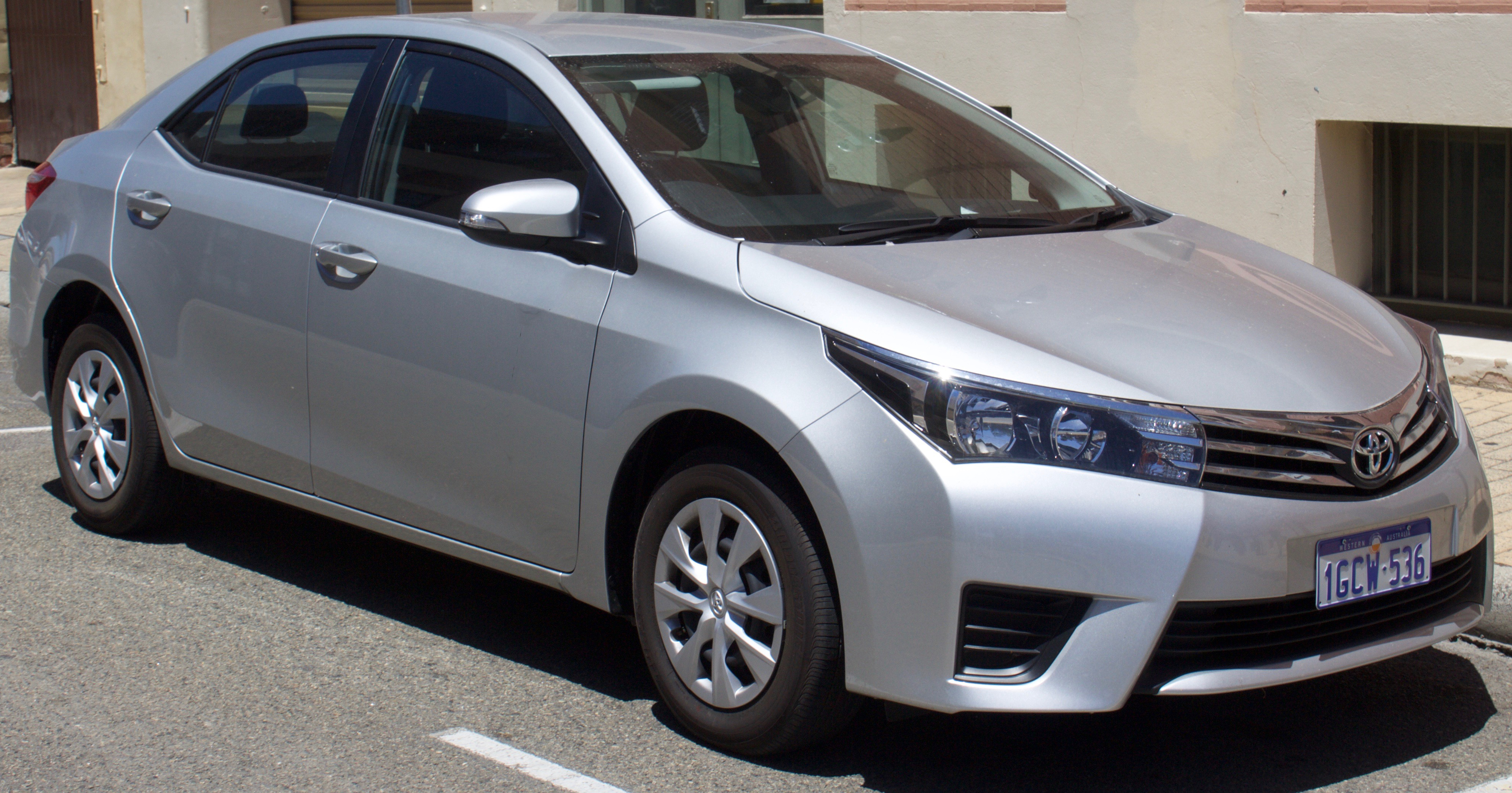

Overview
- Manufacturer: Toyota
- Also called: Toyota Levin (GAC Toyota; China); Pyeonghwa Hwiparam 1622 (N. Korea)
- Production: June 2013 – January 2019 (Europe); August 2013 – February 2019 (US); October 2013 – March 2019 (Taiwan); December 2013 – August 2019 (Thailand); January 2014 – 2024 (South Africa); April 2014 – March 2020 (India); June 2014 – September 2019 (China); July 2014 – present (Pakistan); September 2014 – February 2022 (Vietnam)
- Model years: 2014–2019
- Assembly: Canada: Cambridge, Ontario (TMMC); China: Guangzhou (GAC Toyota); Tianjin (FAW Toyota); India: Bidadi (Toyota India); Pakistan: Karachi (Toyota Indus); South Africa: Prospecton (TSAM); Taiwan: Zhongli; Thailand: Chachoengsao (TMT Gateway Plant); Turkey: Adapazarı (TMMT); United States: Blue Springs, Mississippi (TMMMS); Venezuela: Cumaná (Toyota de Venezuela C.A); Vietnam: Vĩnh Phúc
- Designer: Shinichi Yasui (2010, 2011)

Body and chassis
- Class: Compact car
- Body style: 4-door saloon/sedan
- Layout: Front-engine, front-wheel-drive
- Platform: Toyota New MC platform
- Related: Toyota Auris (E180)

Powertrain
- Engine: Petrol: 1.2 L 8NR-FTS turbo I4; 1.2 L 9NR-FTS I4 (China); 1.3 L 1NR-FE I4 (Europe); 1.3 L 2NZ-FE I4 (Pakistan); 1.6 L 1ZR-FE I4 (Philippines, Singapore and Pakistan); 1.6 L 1ZR-FAE I4; 1.6 L 1ZR-FBE I4 (flexi fuel E85); 1.8 L 2ZR-FE I4; 1.8 L 2ZR-FXE I4 (hybrid); 1.8 L 2ZR-FBE I4 (flexi fuel E85); 2.0 L 3ZR-FE I4; 2.0 L 3ZR-FBE I4 (flexi fuel E85); Diesel: 1.4 L 1ND-TV turbo I4; 2.0 L 1AD-FTV I4
- Transmission: 5/6-speed manual; 4-speed automatic; 7/8-speed Super CVT-i automatic; ECVT

Dimensions
- Wheelbase: 2,700 mm (106.3 in)
- Length: 4,620 mm (181.9 in); 4,639 mm (182.6 in) (North America); 4,650 mm (183.1 in) (Type-S)
- Width: 1,775 mm (69.9 in)
- Height: 1,455–1,460 mm (57.3–57.5 in)
- Curb weight: 1,245–1,300 kg (2,745–2,866 lb); 1,280–1,300 kg (2,822–2,866 lb) (North America)

Chronology
- Predecessor: Toyota Corolla (E140/E150; wide-body)
- Successor: Toyota Corolla (E210); Toyota Yaris (AC100)

The E170/E180 series Toyota Corolla is the eleventh generation of the Corolla and was sold internationally from 2013 to 2024. Two basic front and rear styling treatments are fitted to the E170—a North American version that debuted first—and a more conservative design for all other markets that debuted later in 2013. For the Japanese and Hong Kong markets, the smaller Japanese-made E160 model is offered instead; the Japanese-made version remains compliant with Japanese government dimension regulations. The E170/E180 has an increased wheelbase that is 100 mm (3.9 in) longer than the previous generation. The E170/E180 was derived from the Toyota New MC platform, unlike the E160, which was based on the B platform.

As of 2026, the E170 series Corolla remains on sale in Pakistan.

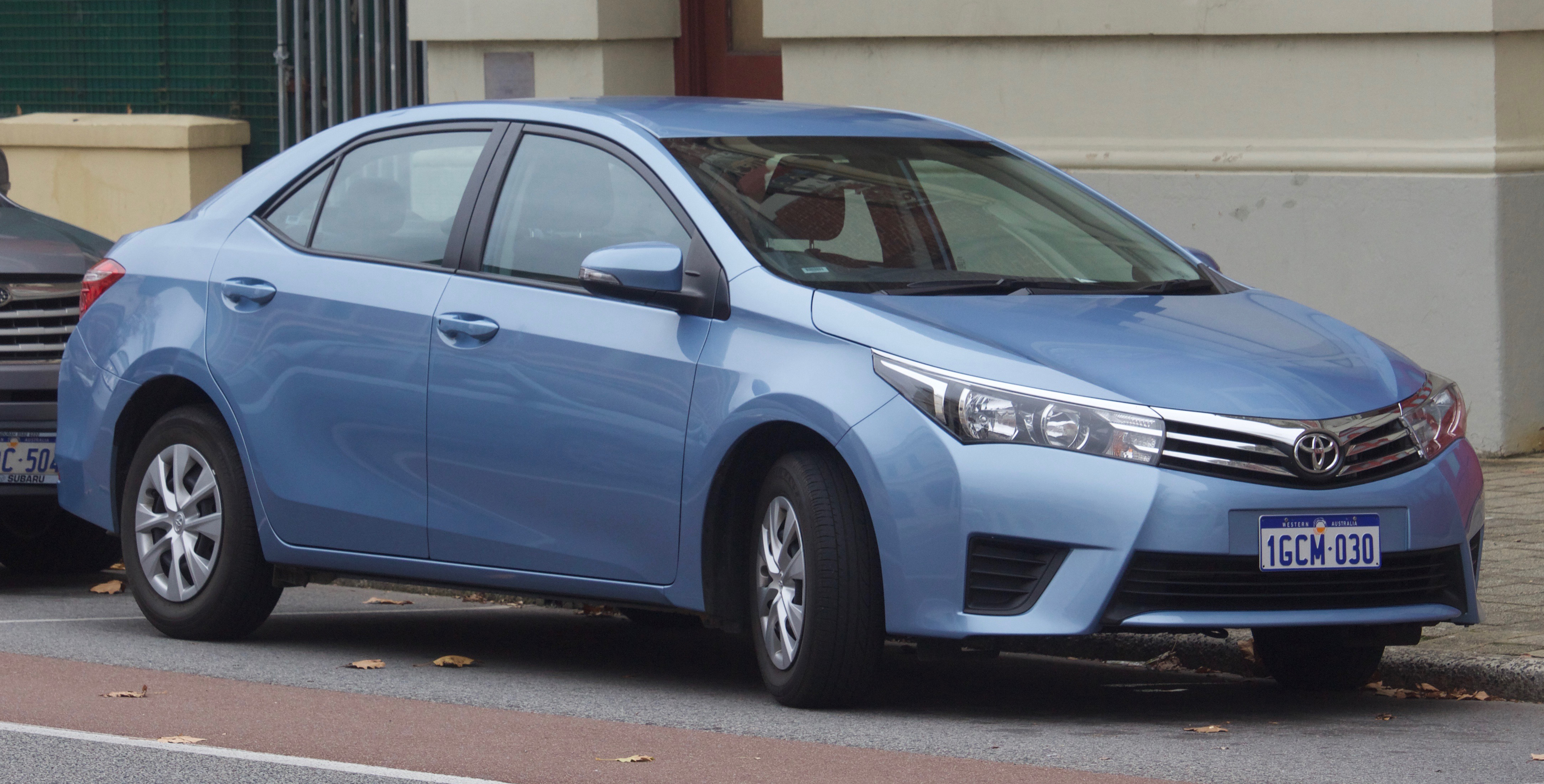
International version

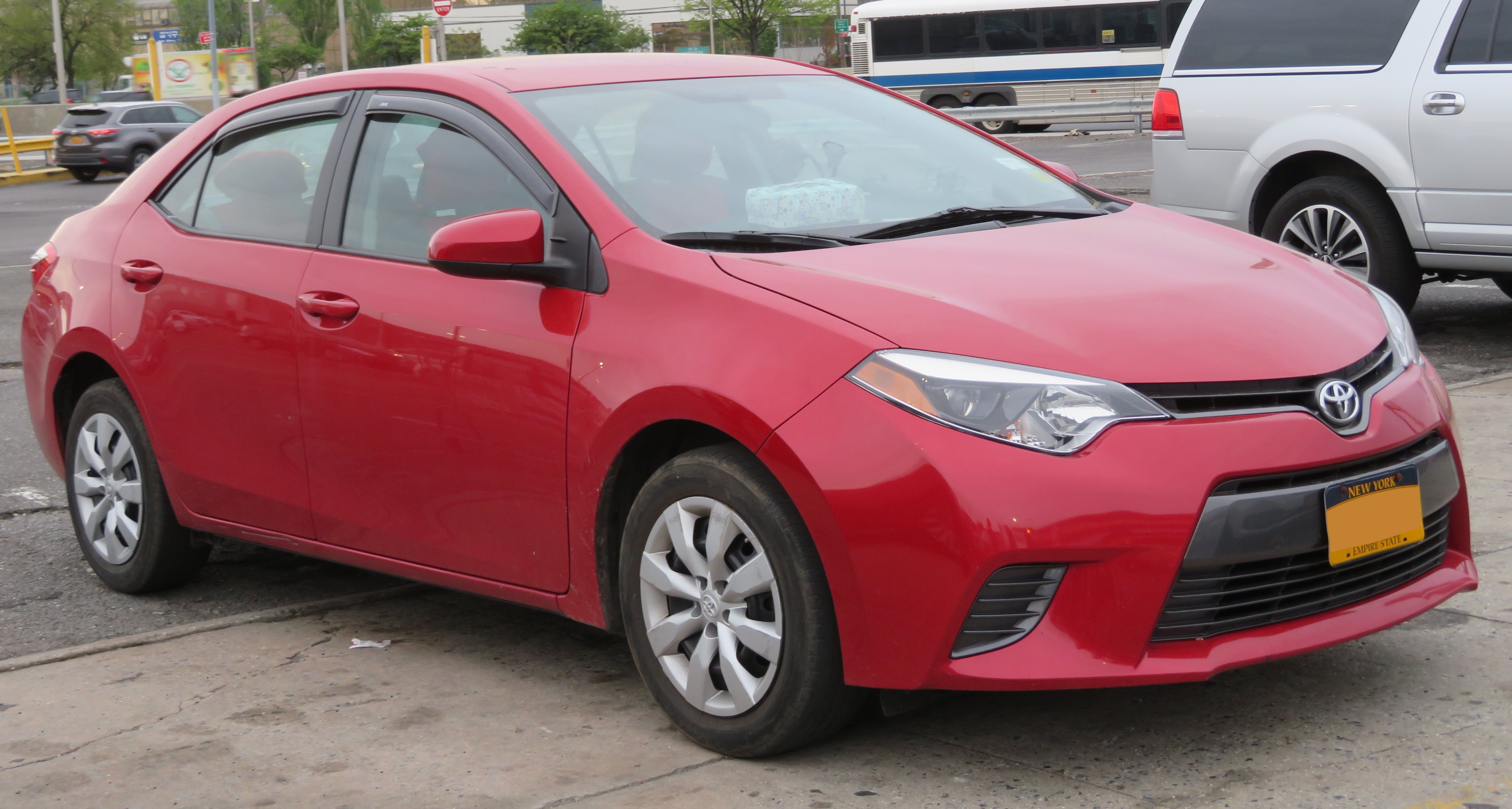
North American version

== International E170 version ==
The E170 series represents the ASEAN, Australasian, Middle Eastern, South Asian, and North American family of the eleventh-generation Corolla sedan. It shares the New MC platform with the E180 but uses a different body-in-white, electrical architecture, and regional powertrain options. Produced mainly in Thailand, Taiwan, and North America, it was marketed as the Corolla Altis in much of Asia and retained conventional torsion-beam rear suspension across all trims.

=== Asia ===
==== India ====
The Corolla Altis was available in India from April 2014 in two engine forms, in petrol and diesel engines. The 1.8-litre 2ZR-FE is powered by petrol and the 1.4-litre (1,364 cc) D-4D engine with variable Nozzle turbo and intercooler is powered by diesel. It gets 60/40 reclining rear seats, rain-sensing wipers, eight-way power adjustable seat with lumbar support, LED headlamps and 16-inch alloys on the top-end GL and VL variants, with all variants receiving LED tail lamps.

On 15 March 2017, the facelift version of the Corolla Altis launched in the country with a revised front fascia and 7 airbags instead of 2, among other updates.

Toyota shutdown the production on 31 March 2020 due to declining sales and did not engineer to meet the Bharat Stage 6 emission standards which came into effect in April. As such, the E210 model would not be introduced to India, making the E170 model as the last Corolla Altis model to be sold in the country.

==== Indonesia ====
Indonesia was the first ASEAN country to get the new Corolla Altis, released on 8 January 2014. Unlike the previous generation, it was released with the 1.8-litre Dual VVT-i engine only, the 2.0-litre Dual VVT-i engine was withdrawn due to small sales. Only 2 variants are offered, the 1.8 G manual transmission and the 1.8 V automatic transmission. The Indonesian market Corolla Altis received its facelift on 16 January 2017 with 7 airbags.

==== Malaysia ====
In Malaysia, the Corolla Altis was launched in January 2014 and came in three variant forms, the base 1.8 E, the 2.0 G and the range-topping 2.0 V. CVT transmission with seven-speed sports sequential shift were standard across the lineup. In November 2014, the 2.0 G was replaced with the 1.8 G. In December 2016, the facelift model was launched with seven airbags, ABS with EBD and brake assist, vehicle stability control and ISOFIX rear child seat anchors as standard equipment. In September 2017, the range was updated with DVR dash cam, 360-degree Panoramic View Monitor and additional USB ports.

Model	Engine	Power	Torque
1.8E	1798 cc 2ZR-FE I4	103 kW (140 PS) at 6,400 rpm	173 N⋅m (128 lb⋅ft) at 4,000 rpm
1.8G	1798 cc 2ZR-FE I4	103 kW (140 PS) at 6,400 rpm	173 N⋅m (128 lb⋅ft) at 4,000 rpm
2.0G	1987 cc 3ZR-FE I4	107 kW (145 PS) at 6,200 rpm	187 N⋅m (138 lb⋅ft) at 3,600 rpm
2.0V	1987 cc 3ZR-FE I4	107 kW (145 PS) at 6,200 rpm	187 N⋅m (138 lb⋅ft) at 3,600 rpm

==== Middle East ====
The Corolla was launched across the Gulf Cooperation Council market in December 2013. Two trims were generally available; XLi and GLi with either a 1.6L 1ZR-FE and/or a 2.0L 3ZR-FE depending on the market. In the United Arab Emirates, they were instead offered as S, SE, SE+ and Limited, with XLi Exclusive joining the lineup in 2019. Additionally, Bahrain would introduce the Corolla X Sports Edition for the 2016 model year only, based on the Taiwanese-market Corolla Altis X. At launch, it was only offered with a 4-speed automatic or 6-speed manual transmission but in 2016, the 4-Speed automatic would be replaced by a CVT-i. All eleventh generation Corolla's sold in the Gulf are sourced from Taiwan.

==== Pakistan ====
Toyota Indus launched the eleventh generation Corolla in July 2014. Initially it was offered with eight trim levels, XLi, GLi, GLi Automatic, Altis 1.6 Automatic, Altis 1.8, Altis Grande 1.8, Altis 1.8 CVT-i and Altis Grande 1.8 CVT-i. The XLi trim was the base variant that lacked many standard features such as ABS, power mirrors, power windows and central locking. These features were available as standard on all other variants. Features such as touchscreen infotainment systems, steering wheel media control buttons, chrome trim pieces, fog lamps and 15" alloy wheels remained exclusive to the Altis variants.

Model	Engine	Transmission
XLi 1.3	1298 cc 2NZ-FE VVT-i I4	5-speed manual C50
GLi 1.3	1298 cc 2NZ-FE VVT-i I4	5-speed manual C50
GLi 1.3 Automatic	1298 cc 2NZ-FE VVT-i I4	4-speed automatic U441E
Altis 1.6 Automatic	1598 cc 1ZR-FE Dual VVT-i I4	4-speed automatic U441E
Altis 1.8	1798 cc 2ZR-FE Dual VVT-i I4	6-speed manual EC60
Altis Grande 1.8	1798 cc 2ZR-FE Dual VVT-i I4	6-speed manual EC60
Altis 1.8 CVT-i	1798 cc 2ZR-FE Dual VVT-i I4	7-speed automatic CVT-i K313
Altis Grande 1.8 CVT-i	1798 cc 2ZR-FE Dual VVT-i I4	7-speed automatic CVT-i K313

In 2018, Toyota introduced a facelift to the eleventh generation Corolla with redesigned headlights and taillights, DRLs and push start ignition (Grande variants only). The facelift brought new features to the Grande variant, including auto-leveling LED headlamps, a new Android based touchscreen infotainment system with built-in vehicle tracking and monitoring through the Toyota Connect App, keyless entry, speed-sensing door locks, updated side skirts, new 16" alloy wheels and rear seat USB charging ports.

With the introduction of the Toyota Yaris in 2020, Indus Motors discontinued the 1.3 L variants of the Corolla, consisting of the XLi, GLi , XLi Automatic and GLi Automatic models.

In 2021, Toyota introduced another minor facelift to the eleventh generation Corolla with new front and rear bumpers as well as new side skirts. At this time, the Corolla was still offered in six trim levels, namely Altis 1.6, Altis 1.6 Automatic, Altis 1.6 Automatic Special Edition, Altis 1.8 CVT-i, Altis Grande 1.8 CVT-i, Altis X Grande 1.8 CVT-i. The Altis 1.6 variants retained the older 4-speed automatic transmission.

For the 2023 model year, Toyota decided to further consolidate the offerings by discontinuing the Altis 1.6 with the 4-speed automatic transmission and launching a new trim of the Altis 1.6 with the same 7-speed CVT-i transmission as the 1.8-liter variants.

As of November 2025, there are five variants available, only one with a 6-speed manual transmission while the remaining four all use the same 7-speed automatic CVT-i transmission. Cruise Control and Sports Mode are limited to the 1.8-liter variants. While certain features such as automatic rain sensors, leather steering wheel, leather seats, auto dimming mirrors, smart key and vehicle stability control are exclusive to the highest trim Altis X Grande 1.8 CVT-i.

The Corolla received another facelift in October 2026 which incorporated Toyota's hammerhead design language.

Corolla Altis X (2023-present)
Model	Engine	Transmission
Altis X 1.6 M/T	1598 cc 1ZR-FE Dual VVT-i I4	6-speed manual EC60
Altis X 1.6 CVT-i	1598 cc 1ZR-FE Dual VVT-i I4	7-speed automatic CVT-i K313
Altis X 1.6 CVT-i Special Edition	1598 cc 1ZR-FE Dual VVT-i I4	7-speed automatic CVT-i K313
Altis X 1.8 CVT-i	1798 cc 2ZR-FE Dual VVT-i I4	7-speed automatic CVT-i K313
Altis X Grande 1.8 CVT-i	1798 cc 2ZR-FE Dual VVT-i I4	7-speed automatic CVT-i K313

==== Philippines ====
The Corolla Altis was first released in early 2014, with five trims available. The entry-level 1.6 E model only came with a six-speed manual transmission, four-beam halogen headlamps, fabric upholstery, and 16-inch alloy wheels. The mid-range 1.6 G model added TVSS, fog lights and was available in six-speed manual or seven-speed continuously variable transmission. The 1.6 V featured a push starter and front bumper sensors, and the high-end 2.0 V added LED headlamps with DRLs, paddle shifters, rain sensing wipers, leather seats, 17-inch alloy wheels, and sport body kit. A minor update for the Altis was later released in December 2016. The higher end variants were now equipped with DRLs and updated safety features such as 7 airbags, ABS and EBD. 1.6 variants were still equipped with halogen headlights, beige interior while the 2.0 variant gained projector HID headlamps, wrap around body kits and leather interior.

==== Singapore ====
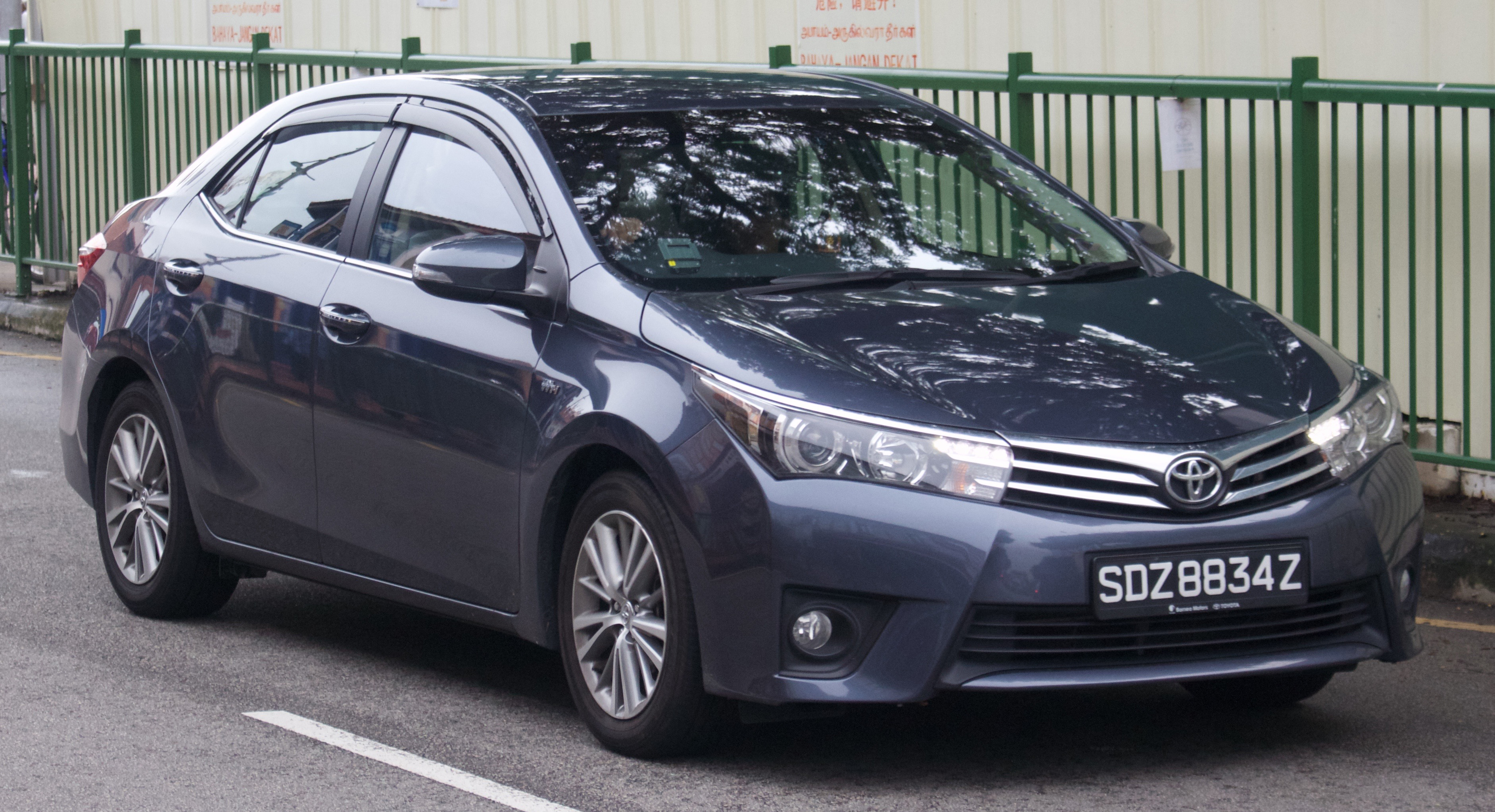
Corolla Altis Elegance (Singapore; pre-facelift)

The new Corolla Altis was available from 10 January 2014 offering only with the 1.6-litre 1ZR-FE Dual VVT-i engine with 7-speed Super CVT-i. Initially offered as a single trim, it was later split into Classic and Elegance trims with the former using multi-reflector headlamps, 16-inch rims, while the latter adds LED headlamps with DRLs, keyless entry with push button start, auto-dimming rear view mirror, ionizer for climate control. In mid 2016, all variants received updated Multi-Information Display (MID) and added steering wheel controls, while Elegance trims added powered driver seat and 17-inch alloy wheels. Later in mid 2017, the facelift model received safety features such as seven airbags, ABS with EBD and brake assist, Vehicle Stability Control (VSC) was standard on all trims and convenience features such as LED foglamps. An Eco trim was initially offered during first batch of the facelift launch, providing a no-frills option with basic 15” alloy rims, leather seats, basic touchscreen unit with buttons and without fog lamps. It was subsequently removed from the lineup as more units of the Standard and Elegance variants were available.

Japanese-market E160 models (Axio and Fielder estate) were also available and sold by grey market importers in petrol or hybrid only for the Fielder.

==== Taiwan ====
The new generation Corolla was marketed as the "Corolla Altis" (used in Southeast Asian markets and some parts of Asia). It is only available with a 1.8-litre Dual VVT-i 2ZR-FE engine with variants such as the Classic, 1.8E Deluxe, Elegance and 1.8 Z. In 2015, an additional sportier version was added to the lineup with the Corolla Altis X moniker. Designed and sold exclusively in Taiwan, the model featured a redesigned front bumper heavily influenced by the 2014 North American Camry facelift, a redesigned lower rear bumper, side skirts, clear tail lamps, and spoilers. In October 2016, the facelift model was launched, with Eco, Standard and Elegance trims. Safety features such as seven airbags, ABS with EBD and brake assist, Vehicle Stability Control (VSC) were standard across all trims.

On 21 September 2017, the updated Corolla Altis X was launched, with the similar front bumper design as the updated Chinese market Levin.

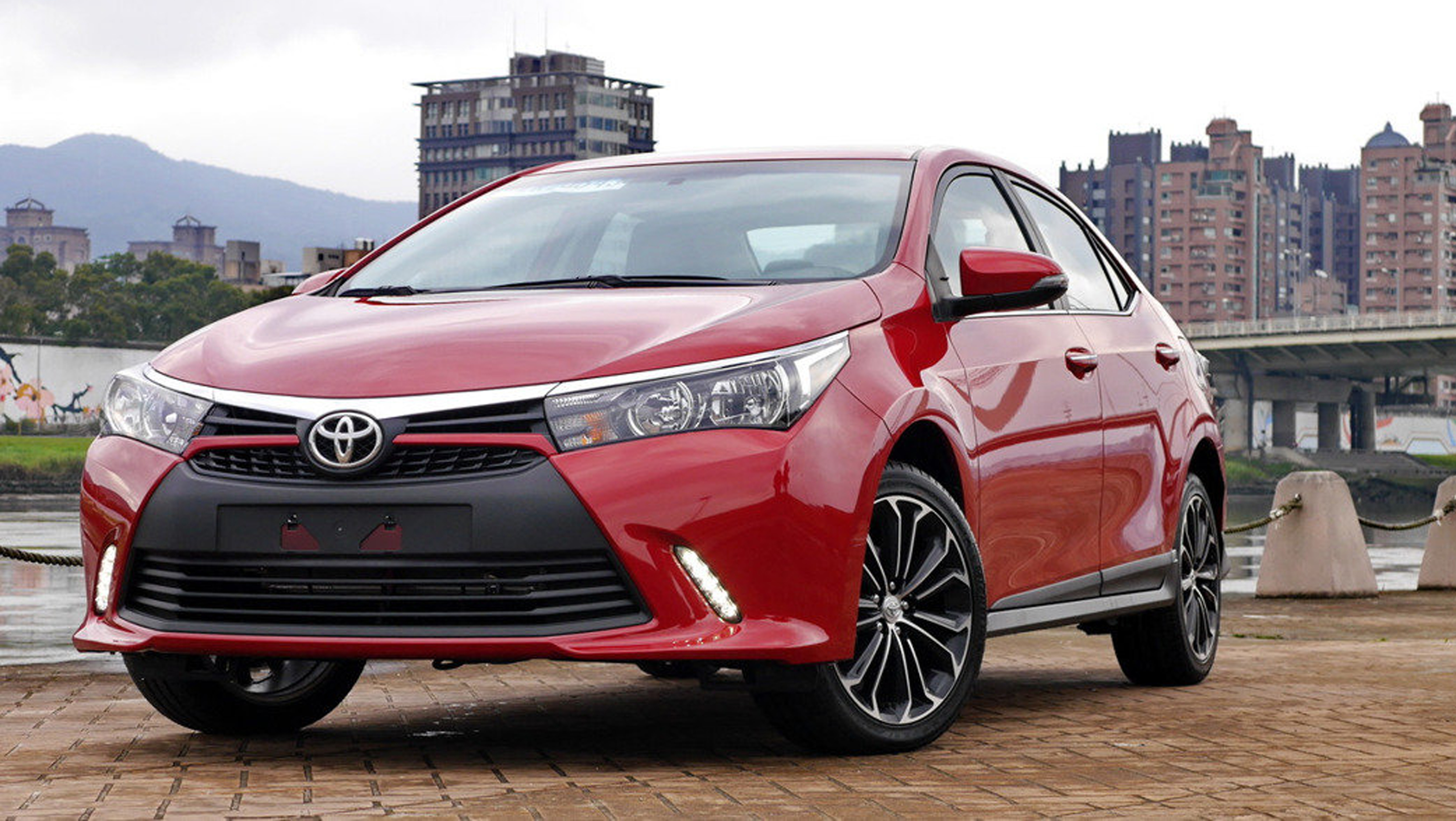
Corolla Altis X (pre-facelift)

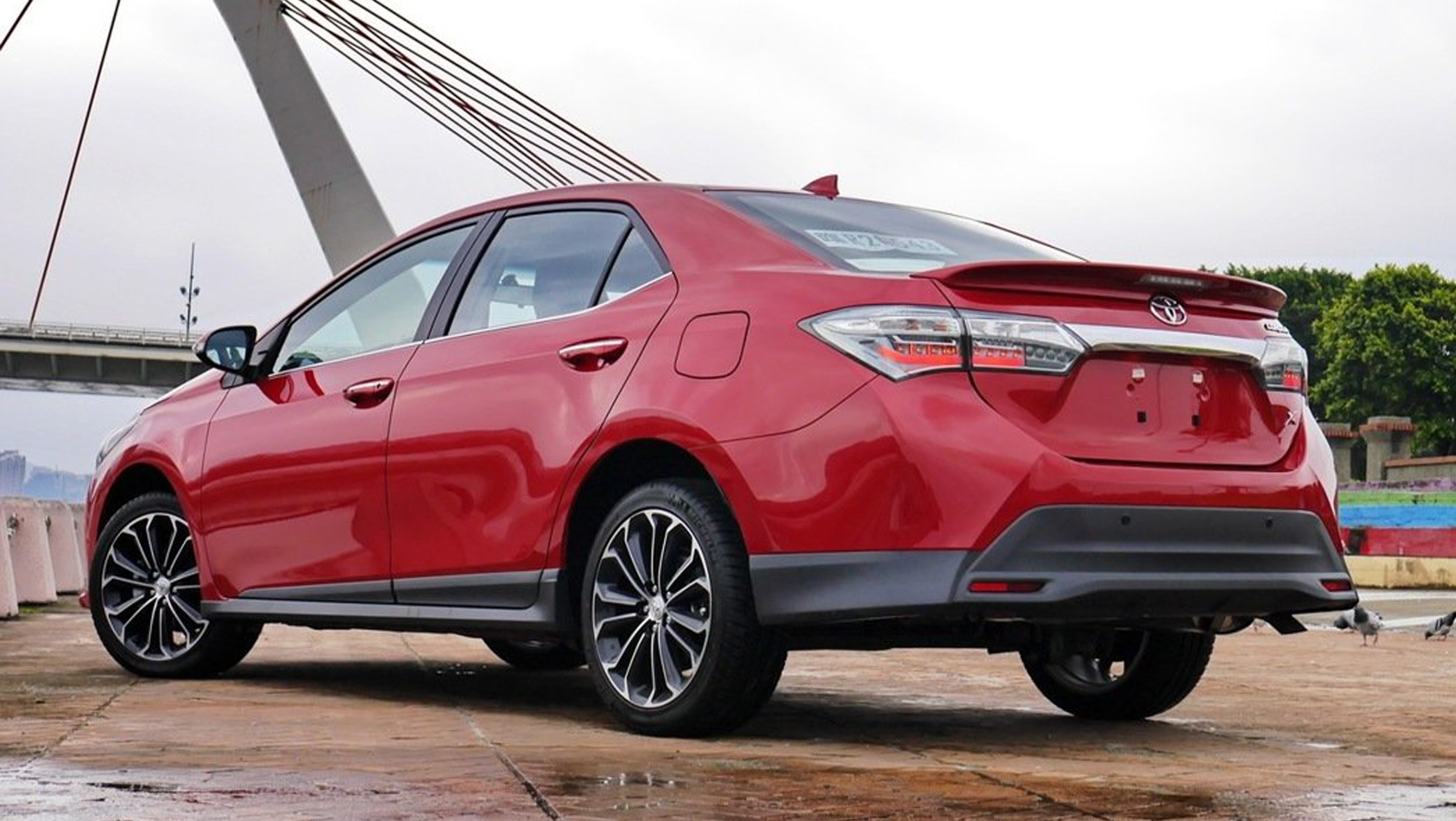
Corolla Altis X (pre-facelift)

==== Thailand ====
The new Corolla Altis was unveiled in Thailand on 14 January 2014 and it is offered in a total of seven grades (J, E, G and V), as well as a special edition grade (ESport). Thailand is the only country to offer all existing grades of the new Altis, being the manufacturing plant for various export markets. In other regions, only certain of the Thai variant or limited features is made available. Unlike most markets in Southeast Asia, CNG powered grades were offered for the 1.6-litre variants of the Corolla Altis. A special edition grade (E Sport) was also offered only in Thailand which comes with an aerodynamic bodykit including a rear spoiler, sport seats and 17-inch multi-spoke alloys. Grades available for the Corolla Altis in Thailand vary from the basic 1.6J to the high spec 1.8V Navi model.

Marketed as Corolla:

- 1.6 J – 1.6 litre DOHC 1ZR-FE Dual VVT-i engine, 6-speed manual transmission, 3-spoke urethane steering wheel, includes tachometer, electric power steering, windows, door locks and mirrors, standard gauge instrument cluster, integrated AM/FM radio with CD, MP3 and WMA player, Auxiliary input and USB input with 4 speakers, manual dial-type air conditioning, gray Fabric seats, colour-keyed door handles, standard headlamps, Dual SRS airbags and 15-inch alloy rims.
- 1.6 J CNG – 1.6 litre DOHC 1ZR-FE Advanced CNG Dual VVT-i engine, 6-speed manual transmission, same specifications and features with the 1.6 J model with the inclusion of CNG kits.

Marketed as Corolla Altis:

- 1.6 E CNG – 1.6 litre DOHC 1ZR-FE Advanced CNG Dual VVT-i engine, 7-speed Super CVT-i transmission with Super ECT, 3-spoke urethane steering wheel with audio controls, same specifications and features with the 1.6J CNG model with the inclusion of power mirrors with retractable function, beige Fabric seats, Toyota Vehicle Security System (TVSS) with auto alarm function, Anti-lock Braking System (ABS) with Electronic Brake-force Distribution (EBD) and 16-inch multi-spoke alloy rims.
- 1.6 G – 1.6 litre DOHC 1ZR-FE Dual VVT-i engine, 7-speed Super CVT-i with Super ECT, same specifications and features as the 1.6E CNG model with the removal of CNG kits and the inclusion of 6 Speakers on the audio system.
- 1.8 E – 1.8 litre DOHC 2ZR-FBE Dual VVT-i Flexi-fuel engine, 7-speed Super CVT-i transmission with Super ECT, same features as the 1.6G model with the speakers reduced to 4 on the audio system.
- 1.8 S – 1.8 litre DOHC 2ZR-FBE Dual VVT-i Flexi-fuel engine, 7-speed Super CVT-i transmission with Super ECT, 3-spoke leather wrapped steering wheel with audio controls, same specifications and features as 1.8E model with the speakers increasing to 6 instead of 4, genuine black leather seats, rear center console with cupholders, projector-type LED Headlamps, LED Daytime running lights (DRLs), chrome accents on door handles and 17-inch machine-cut alloy rims.
- 1.8 ESport – 1.8 litre DOHC 2ZR-FBE Dual VVT-i Flexi-fuel engine, 7-speed Super CVT-i transmission with Super ECT, same specifications and features as 1.8S model with the inclusion of dark chrome grille with gun metallic stripes, front and rear skirts, side skirts, rear spoiler and sporty exhaust pipes.
- 1.8 ESport Nürburging Edition – 1.8 litre DOHC 2ZR-FBE Dual VVT-i Flexi-fuel engine, 7-speed Super CVT-i transmission with Super ECT, 3-spoke red-stitched leather wrapped steering wheel with audio controls, same specifications and features as 1.8ESport model with the inclusion of piano black grille with gun metallic stripes, front and rear skirts, side skirts, special designed rear spoiler, sporty exhaust pipes, halogen foglamps and 6.1-inch Touchscreen display audio with built-in Navigation System, added in March 2015.
- 1.8 G – 1.8 litre DOHC 2ZR-FBE Dual VVT-i Flexi-fuel engine, 7-speed Super CVT-i transmission with Super ECT, 3-spoke leather wrapped steering wheel with audio and MID controls, same specifications and features as 1.8E model with the inclusion of advanced Toyota Vehicle Security System (TVSS), Smart Keyless Entry System with Engine Start-Stop button, auto-folding side mirrors, optitron gauge instrument cluster, genuine black leather seats, 60/40 split-fold rear seats, rear center console with cupholders, cruise control, Vehicle Stability Control (VSC) and Traction Control (TRC).
- 1.8 V Navi – 1.8 litre DOHC 2ZR-FBE VVT-i engine, 7-speed Super CVT-i transmission with Super ECT, same specifications and features as 1.8G model with the inclusion of projector-type LED Headlamps, LED Daytime running lights (DRLs), 6.1-inch Touchscreen display audio with built-in Navigation System and Bluetooth and 6-way Power-adjustable driver and front passenger seats.

The Corolla Altis received minor updates on 26 January 2016 for the 2016 model, The 1.6-litre 1ZR-FE engine was replaced with the E85-compliant 1ZR-FBE Flexi-fuel engine. The 1.6J CNG and 1.8S models were removed from the lineup, while the rest of the lineup gets some updates, Anti-lock Braking System (ABS) with Electronic Brake-force Distribution (EBD), Vehicle Stability Control (VSC) and Traction Control (TRC) became standard across the lineup.

Marketed as Corolla:

- 1.6 J – 1.6 litre DOHC 1ZR-FBE Dual VVT-i Flexi-fuel engine, 6-speed manual transmission, 3-spoke urethane steering wheel, includes tachometer, electric power steering, windows, door locks and mirrors, standard gauge instrument cluster, integrated AM/FM radio with CD, MP3 and WMA player, Auxiliary input and USB input with 4 speakers, manual dial-type air conditioning, gray Fabric seats, colour-keyed door handles, standard headlamps, Dual SRS airbags, Anti-lock Braking System (ABS) with Electronic Brake-force Distribution (EBD), Vehicle Stability Control (VSC), Traction Control (TRC) and 15-inch alloy rims.

Marketed as Corolla Altis:

- 1.6 E CNG – 1.6 litre DOHC 1ZR-FBE Advanced CNG Dual VVT-i Flexi-fuel engine, 7-speed Super CVT-i transmission with Super ECT, 3-spoke urethane steering wheel with audio controls, same specifications and features with the 1.6J model with the inclusion of CNG kits, power mirrors with retractable function, beige Fabric seats, Toyota Vehicle Security System (TVSS) with auto alarm function and 16-inch multi-spoke alloy rims.
- 1.6 G – 1.6 litre DOHC 1ZR-FBE Dual VVT-i Flexi-fuel engine, 7-speed Super CVT-i with Super ECT, same specifications and features as the 1.6E CNG model with the removal of CNG kits and the inclusion of chrome accents on door handles and 6 Speakers on the audio system.
- 1.8 E – 1.8 litre DOHC 2ZR-FBE Dual VVT-i Flexi-fuel engine, 7-speed Super CVT-i transmission with Super ECT, same features as the 1.6G model with the speakers reduced to 4 on the audio system.
- 1.8 ESport – 1.8 litre DOHC 2ZR-FBE Dual VVT-i Flexi-fuel engine, 7-speed Super CVT-i transmission with Super ECT, 3-spoke leather wrapped steering wheel with audio controls, same specifications and features as 1.8E model with the speakers increasing to 6 instead of 4, genuine black leather seats, rear center console with cupholders, projector-type LED Headlamps, LED Daytime running lights (DRLs), halogen foglamps and 17-inch machine-cut alloy rims.
- 1.8 ESport Nürburging Edition – 1.8 litre DOHC 2ZR-FBE Dual VVT-i Flexi-fuel engine, 7-speed Super CVT-i transmission with Super ECT, 3-spoke red-stitched leather wrapped steering wheel with audio and MID controls, same specifications and features as 1.8ESport model with the inclusion of piano black grille with revised body kits, advanced Toyota Vehicle Security System (TVSS), Smart Keyless Entry System with Engine Start-Stop button, auto-folding side mirrors, TFT optitron gauge instrument cluster and 6.1-inch Touchscreen display audio with built-in Navigation System.
- 1.8 G – 1.8 litre DOHC 2ZR-FBE Dual VVT-i Flexi-fuel engine, 7-speed Super CVT-i transmission with Super ECT, same specifications and features as 1.8ESport model with the inclusion of 60/40 split-fold rear seats, rear center console with cupholders, cruise control, paddle shifters, cabin Air-Filtration system and the wheels was reduced to 16-inch multi-spoke alloy rims.
- 1.8 V Navi – 1.8 litre DOHC 2ZR-FBE VVT-i engine, 7-speed Super CVT-i transmission with Super ECT, same specifications and features as 1.8G model with the inclusion of reclining rear seats and 6.1-inch Touchscreen display audio with built-in Navigation System.

Model	Engine	Power	Torque
1.6J / 1.6J CNG	1598 cc 1ZR-FE/1ZR-FBE I4	92 kW (125 PS) at 6,000 rpm	157 N⋅m (116 lb⋅ft) at 5,200 rpm
1.6G / 1.6E CNG	1598 cc 1ZR-FE/1ZR-FBE I4	92 kW (125 PS) at 6,000 rpm	157 N⋅m (116 lb⋅ft) at 5,200 rpm
1.8E / 1.8S / 1.8 ESport	1798 cc 2ZR-FBE I4	104 kW (141 PS) at 6,000 rpm	177 N⋅m (131 lb⋅ft) at 4,000 rpm
1.8G / 1.8V Navi	1798 cc 2ZR-FBE I4	104 kW (141 PS) at 6,000 rpm	177 N⋅m (131 lb⋅ft) at 4,000 rpm

The facelifted Corolla Altis was launched on 21 November 2016, it featured new grille, revised tail lights, and new set of instrument cluster gauges. The 1.8G model was discontinued from the lineup, while the ESport Nürburging edition was replaced by the ESport Option, the 1.8S model was reintroduced in May 2018 and the 1.8V Navi gained Telematics support from T-connect.

Marketed as Corolla:

- 1.6 J – 1.6 litre DOHC 1ZR-FBE Dual VVT-i Flexi-fuel engine, 6-speed manual transmission, 3-spoke urethane steering wheel, includes tachometer, electric power steering, windows, door locks and mirrors, standard gauge instrument cluster, integrated AM/FM radio with CD, MP3 and WMA player, Auxiliary input and USB input with Bluetooth Function and 4 speakers, manual dial-type air conditioning, gray Fabric seats, colour-keyed door handles, standard headlamps, 7 SRS airbags, Anti-lock Braking System (ABS) with Electronic Brake-force Distribution (EBD), Vehicle Stability Control (VSC), Traction Control (TRC) and 15-inch alloy rims.

Marketed as Corolla Altis:

- 1.6 E CNG – 1.6 litre DOHC 1ZR-FBE Advanced CNG Dual VVT-i Flexi-fuel engine, 7-speed Super CVT-i transmission with Super ECT, 3-spoke urethane steering wheel with audio controls, same specifications and features with the 1.6J model with the inclusion of CNG kits, power mirrors with retractable function, beige Fabric seats, Toyota Vehicle Security System (TVSS) with auto alarm function and 16-inch two-tone multi-spoke alloy rims.
- 1.6 G – 1.6 litre DOHC 1ZR-FBE Dual VVT-i Flexi-fuel engine, 7-speed Super CVT-i with Super ECT, same specifications and features as the 1.6E CNG model with the removal of CNG kits and the inclusion of chrome accents on door handles, advanced Toyota Vehicle Security System (TVSS), Smart Keyless Entry System with Engine Start-Stop button and 6 Speakers on the audio system.
- 1.8 E – 1.8 litre DOHC 2ZR-FBE Dual VVT-i Flexi-fuel engine, 7-speed Super CVT-i transmission with Super ECT, same features as the 1.6G model with the removal of advanced Toyota Vehicle Security System (TVSS), Smart Keyless Entry System with Engine Start-Stop button and auto-folding side mirrors and the inclusion of black fabric seats and reduced 4 speakers on the audio system.
- 1.8 S – 1.8 litre DOHC 2ZR-FBE Dual VVT-i Flexi-fuel engine, 7-speed Super CVT-i transmission with Super ECT, 3-spoke leather wrapped steering wheel with audio controls, same specifications and features as 1.8E model with the inclusion of advanced Toyota Vehicle Security System (TVSS), Smart Keyless Entry System with Engine Start-Stop button, auto-folding side mirrors, speakers increasing to 6 instead of 4, genuine black leather seats, reclining rear seats, rear center console with cupholders, 60/40 split-fold rear seats, cruise control, projector-type LED Headlamps, LED Daytime running lights (DRLs), auto-folding side mirrors and 17-inch sport alloy rims, added in May 2018.
- 1.8 ESport – 1.8 litre DOHC 2ZR-FBE Dual VVT-i Flexi-fuel engine, 7-speed Super CVT-i transmission with Super ECT, 3-spoke red-stitched leather wrapped steering wheel with audio and MID controls, same specifications and features as 1.8S model with the inclusion of chrome grille with dark metallic stripes, front and rear skirts, side skirts, rear spoiler and sporty exhaust pipes.
- 1.8 ESport Option – 1.8 litre DOHC 2ZR-FBE Dual VVT-i Flexi-fuel engine, 7-speed Super CVT-i transmission with Super ECT, 3-spoke leather wrapped steering wheel with audio and MID controls, same specifications and features as 1.8ESport model with the inclusion of TFT optitron gauge instrument cluster, 8-way power adjustable drivers seat and 7-inch Touchscreen display audio system.
- 1.8 V Navi – 1.8 litre DOHC 2ZR-FBE VVT-i engine, 7-speed Super CVT-i transmission with Super ECT, same specifications and features as 1.8Esport Option model with the inclusion of Navigation System, 6-way power adjustable front passenger seat and the wheels were reduced to 16-inch two-tone multi-spoke alloy rims, T-Connect telematics added in May 2018.

Model	Engine	Power	Torque
1.6E CNG	1598 cc 1ZR-FBE I4	92 kW (125 PS) at 6,000 rpm	157 N⋅m (116 lb⋅ft) at 5,200 rpm
1.6J / 1.6G	1598 cc 1ZR-FBE I4	92 kW (125 PS) at 6,000 rpm	157 N⋅m (116 lb⋅ft) at 5,200 rpm
1.8E / 1.8 ESport	1798 cc 2ZR-FBE I4	104 kW (141 PS) at 6,000 rpm	177 N⋅m (131 lb⋅ft) at 4,000 rpm
1.8S / 1.8V Navi	1798 cc 2ZR-FBE I4	104 kW (141 PS) at 6,000 rpm	177 N⋅m (131 lb⋅ft) at 4,000 rpm

=== Australia and New Zealand ===
Toyota in Australia and New Zealand launched the E170 series Corolla sedan in late February 2014. An equivalent hatchback model is also retailed under the Corolla nameplate, but this is actually a rebadged E180 Auris released earlier in 2012. For the sedan version, which was imported from Thailand, there were three different variants: the base Ascent, the mid range SX model, and the flagship ZR. The Corolla sedan and hatchback (Auris) were together in 2014 the top selling car in Australia.

Sedan

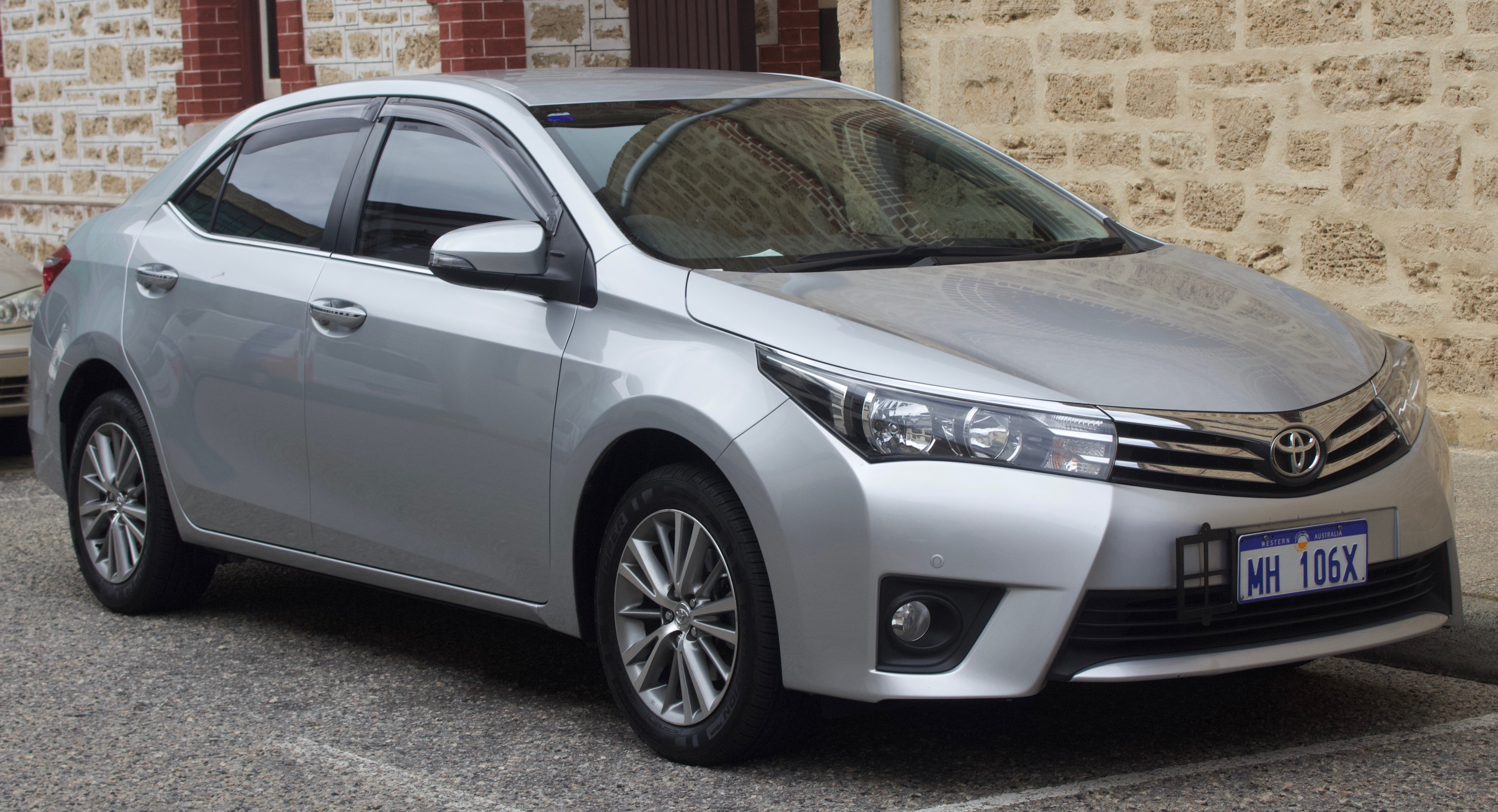
Corolla SX sedan (pre-facelift)

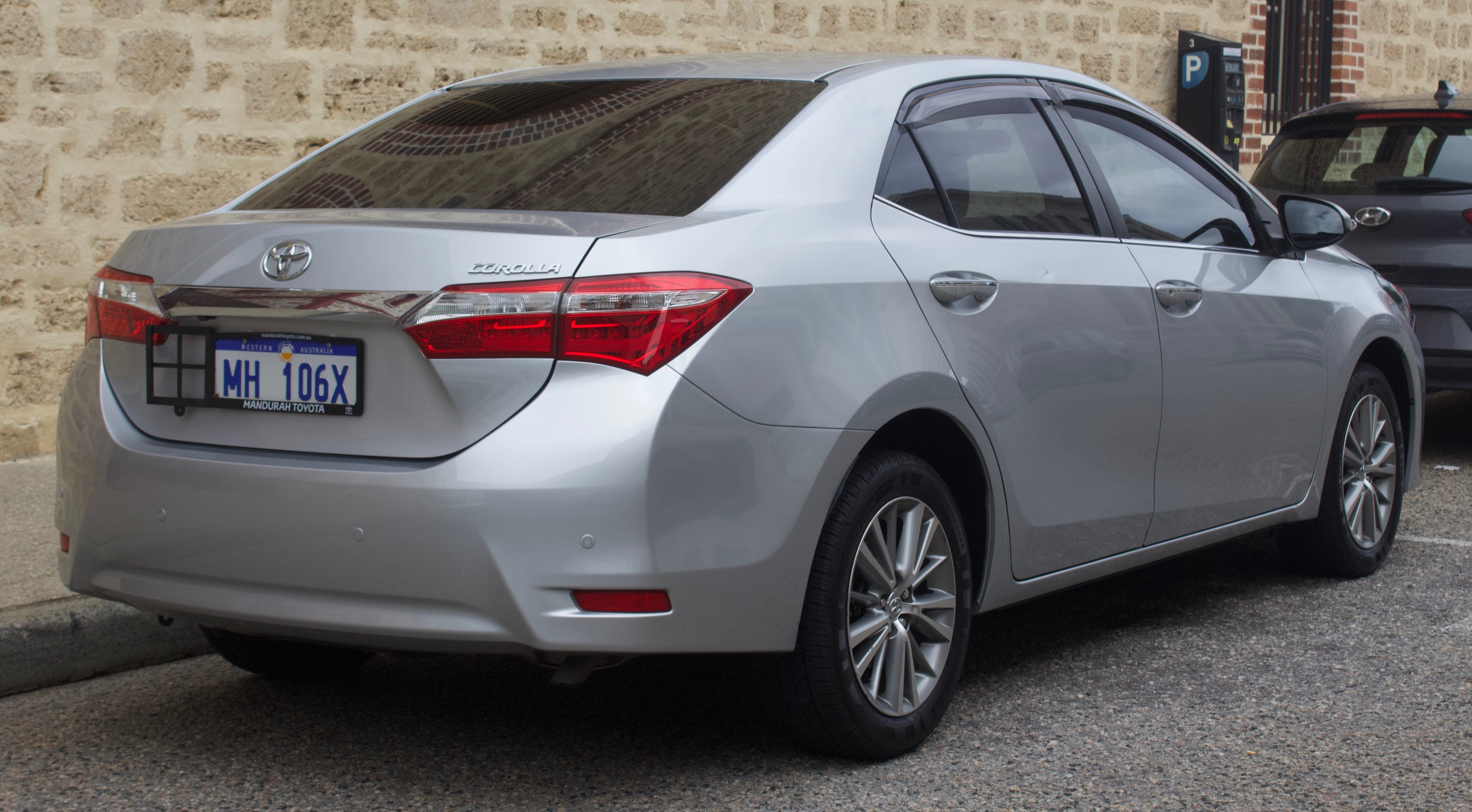
Corolla SX sedan (pre-facelift)

Hatchback (rebadged E180 Auris)

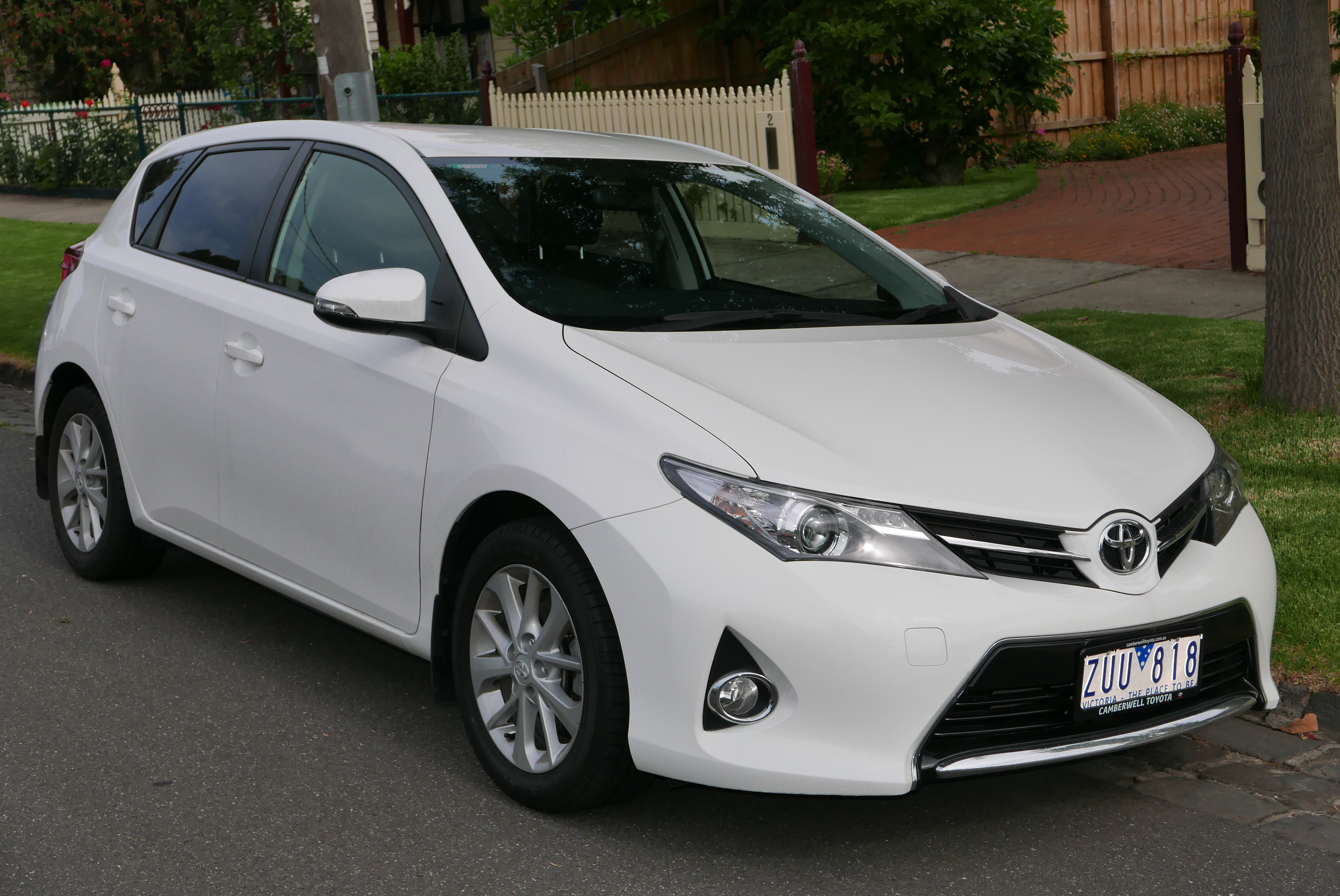
Corolla Ascent Sport hatchback (pre-facelift)

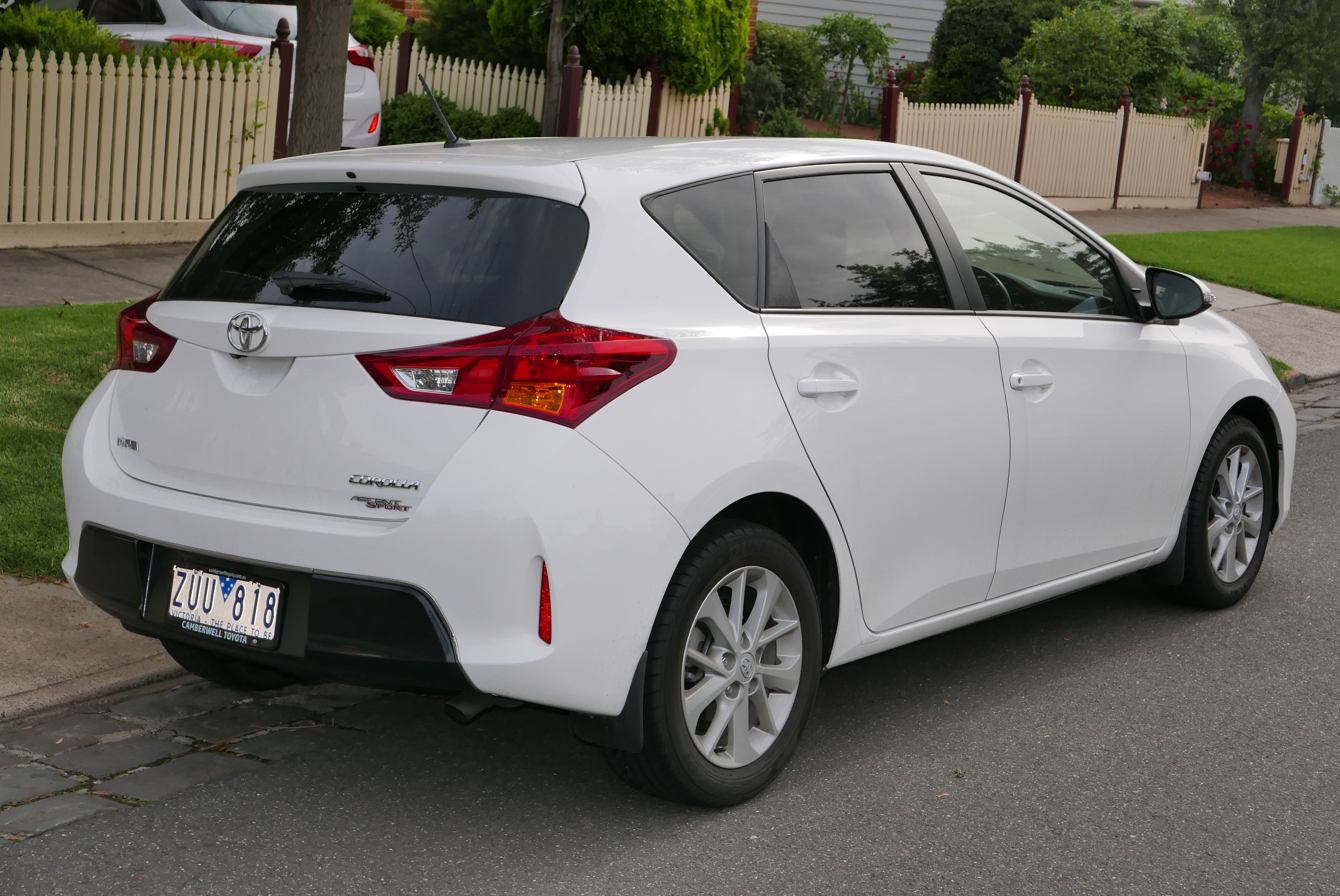
Corolla Ascent Sport hatchback (pre-facelift)

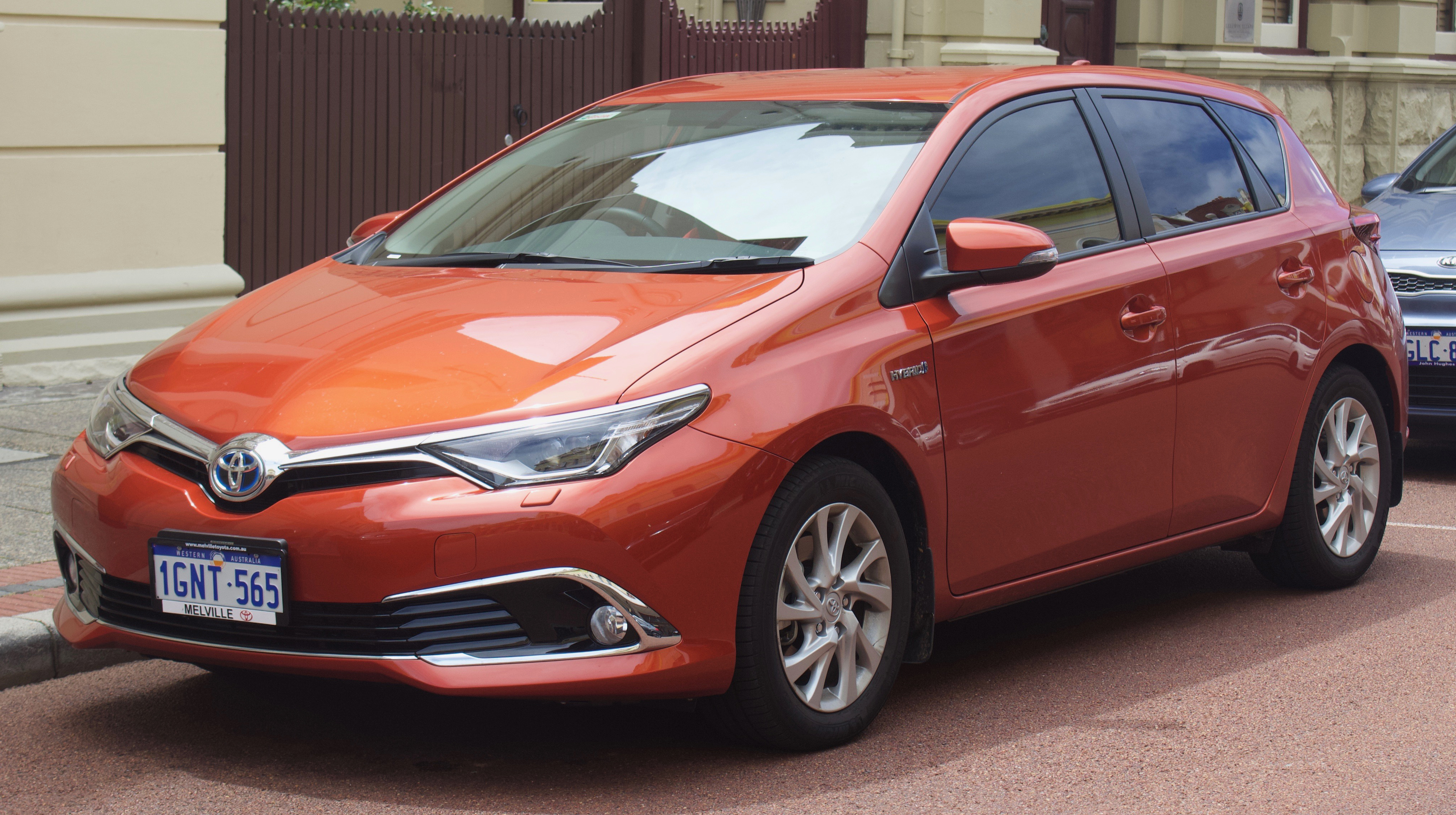
Corolla Hybrid hatchback (facelift)

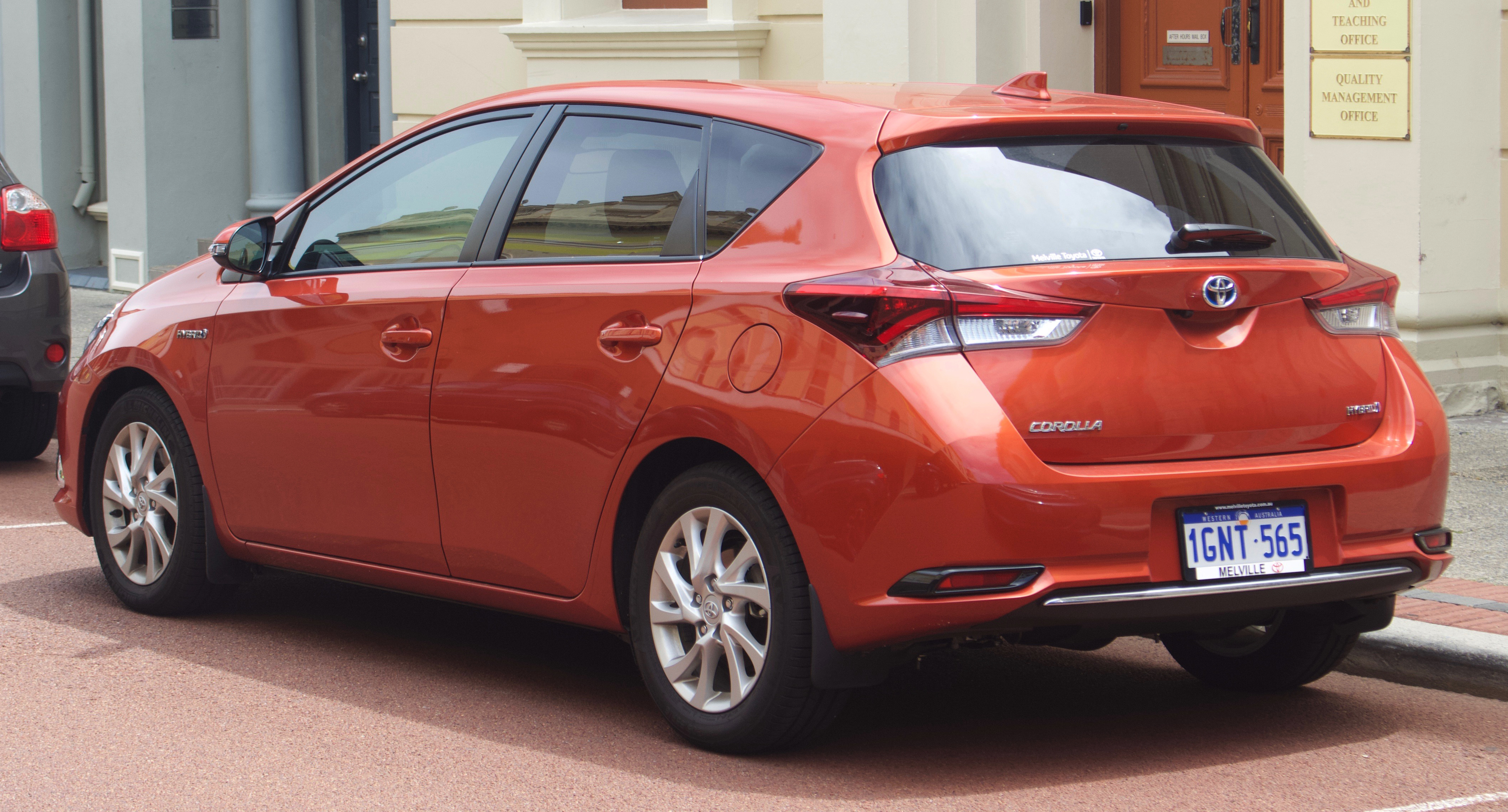
Corolla Hybrid hatchback (facelift)

=== Facelift ===
The facelifted international version of the E170 Corolla was unveiled on 24 March 2016. It features sleeker LED headlamps with new LED light guides, thinner upper chrome grille, a full-width lower grille that houses the fog lamps, which has the option of LED foglamps along with the update. At the rear the chrome strip is thinner and the tail lamps adopt new single LED cluster strips. The facelifted E170 Corolla Altis was launched in Thailand on 21 November 2016, in the Philippines on 8 December 2016, in Malaysia on 9 December 2016, in Indonesia on 16 January 2017, in Singapore in July 2017 and in Pakistan in August 2017.

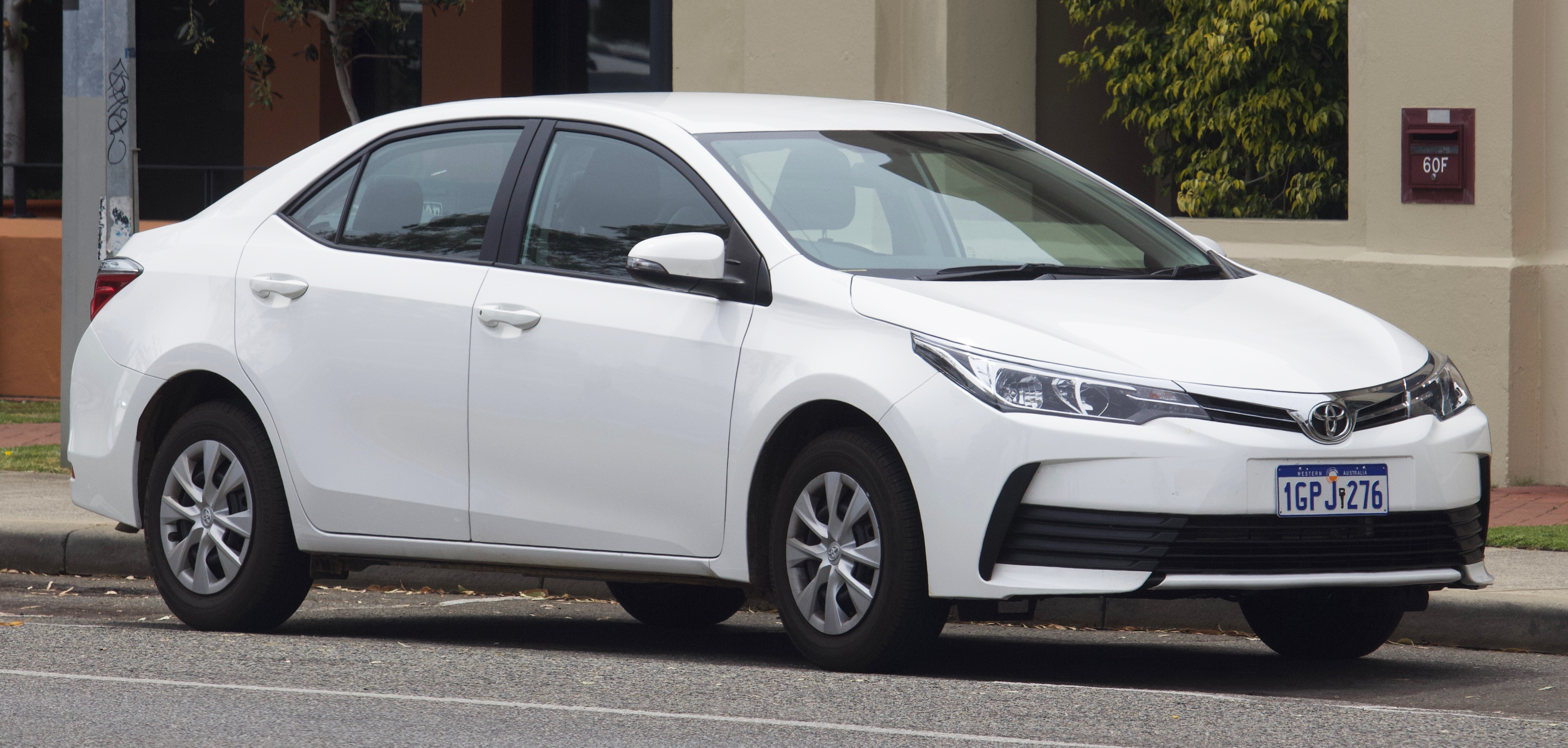
Corolla Ascent saloon (Australia; facelift)

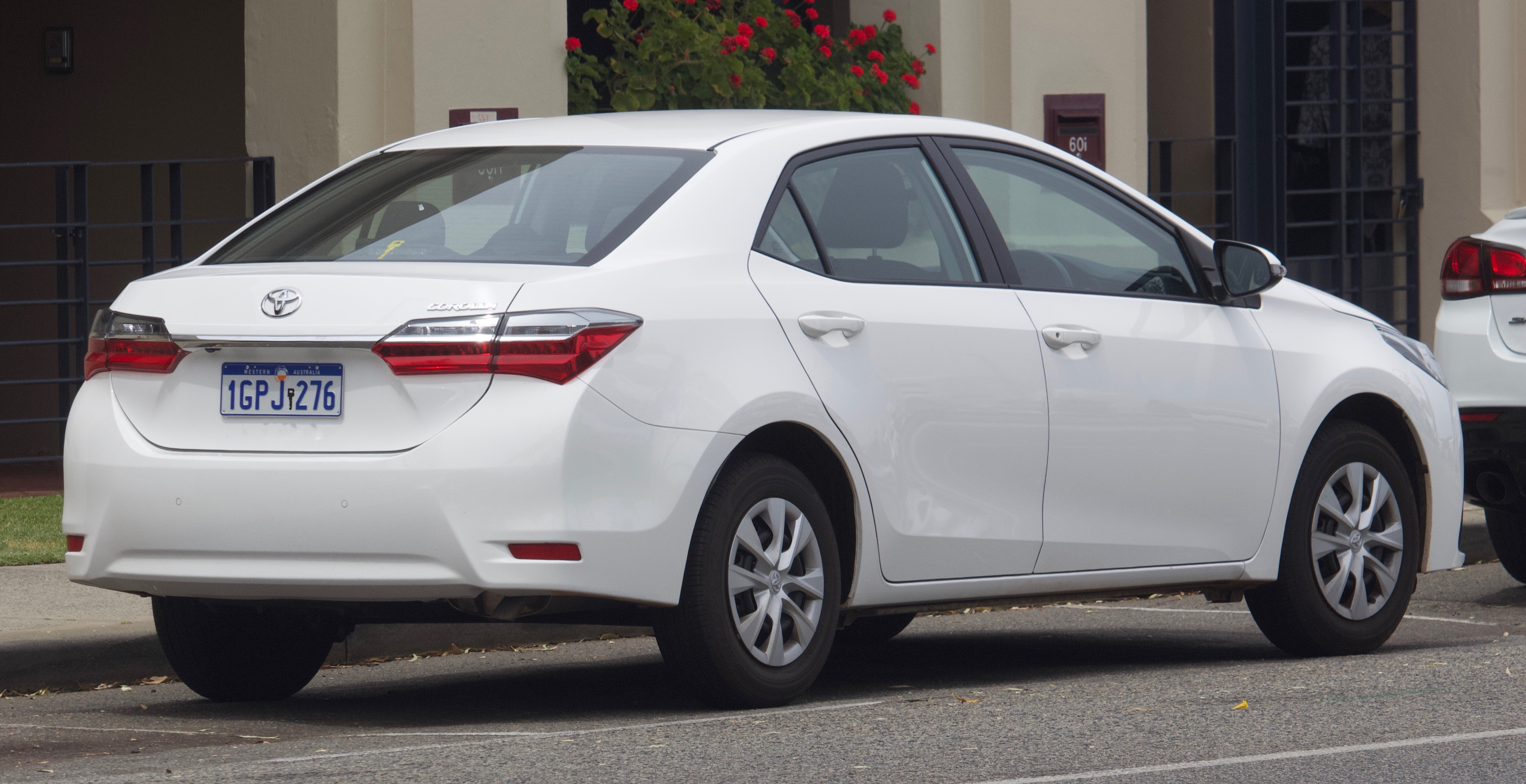
Corolla Ascent saloon (Australia; facelift)

=== Safety ===
ANCAP test results* Toyota Corolla all sedan variants (2014)
Test	Score
Overall	5 /5 stars
Frontal offset	14.88/16
Side impact	16/16
Pole	2/2
Seat belt reminders	2/3
Whiplash protection	Good
Pedestrian protection	Adequate
Electronic stability control	Standard

ANCAP test results* Toyota Corolla all sedan variants (2014)
Test	Score
Overall	5 /5 stars
Frontal offset	14.88/16
Side impact	16/16
Pole	2/2
Seat belt reminders	2/3
Whiplash protection	Good
Pedestrian protection	Adequate
Electronic stability control	Standard

ASEAN NCAP test results Toyota Corolla Altis 1.8 E (2013)
Test	Points	Stars
Adult occupant:	13.35	4 /5 stars
Child occupant:	78%	4 /5 stars
Safety assist:	NA	

ASEAN NCAP test results Toyota Corolla Altis 1.8 E (2014)
Test	Points	Stars
Adult occupant:	14.88	5 /5 stars
Child occupant:	78%	4 /5 stars
Safety assist:	NA	

== International E180 version ==
The E180 series is the Auris-derived sedan family built for Europe, South Africa, and China, including the FAW-Toyota Corolla and GAC-Toyota Levin. It aligns with the European Auris in structural and electrical architecture and offers region-specific engines such as the 1.33-litre 1NR-FE, 1.4-litre D-4D diesel, and 1.2-litre turbo units, alongside 1.6- and 1.8-litre petrols. Assembly took place in markets such as Turkey, South Africa, and multiple plants in China.

=== China ===
Toyota would sell two versions of the E180 Corolla in China, the international version, called the FAW-Toyota Corolla, which is similar in appearance to the Corolla Altis, and the Guangqi-Toyota Levin, which sports a design closer to the North American version, but is still a separate design (see below). In October 2015, Toyota introduced the Corolla hybrid variant in China with locally produced hybrid systems. Production for the Corolla E180 commenced in June 2014 for the 2015 model year. Engine and transmission choices available are the 1.6 litre 1ZR-FE and 1.8 litre 2ZR-FE paired with 5 speed manual or continuously variable transmissions. The Levin also shares these engines and transmissions.

In 2017, both versions of the Corolla in China received a facelift and a 1.2-litre 9NR-FTS turbocharged engine. The FAW-Toyota Corolla also had the old 1.6-litre engine as an option but the Levin dropped the 1.6-litre engine. While the E180 Corolla, Levin, and Levin plug-in hybrid ended production in September 2019, the Corolla plug-in hybrid is still available for purchase as of March 2022.

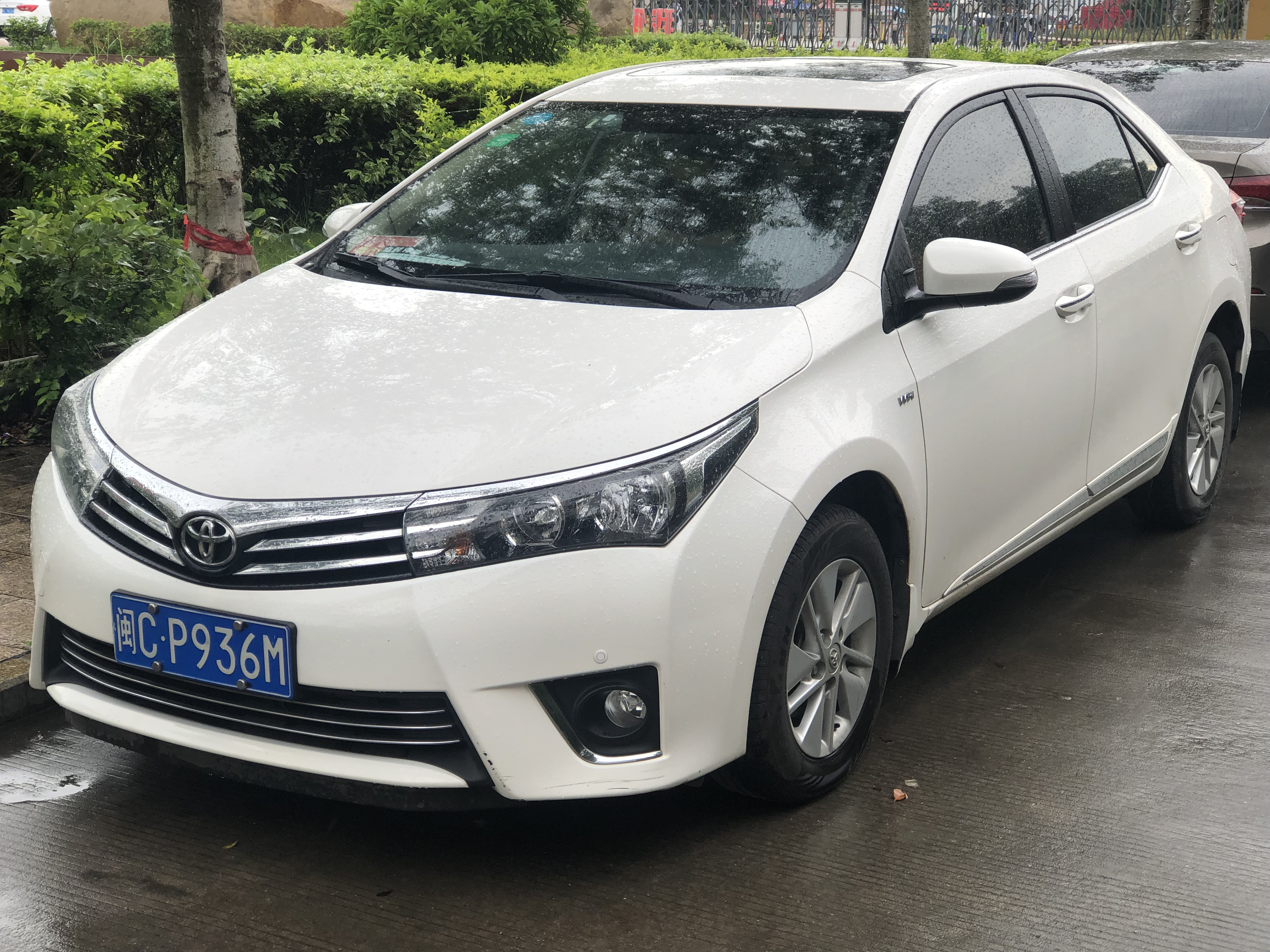
FAW-Toyota Corolla (pre-facelift, China)

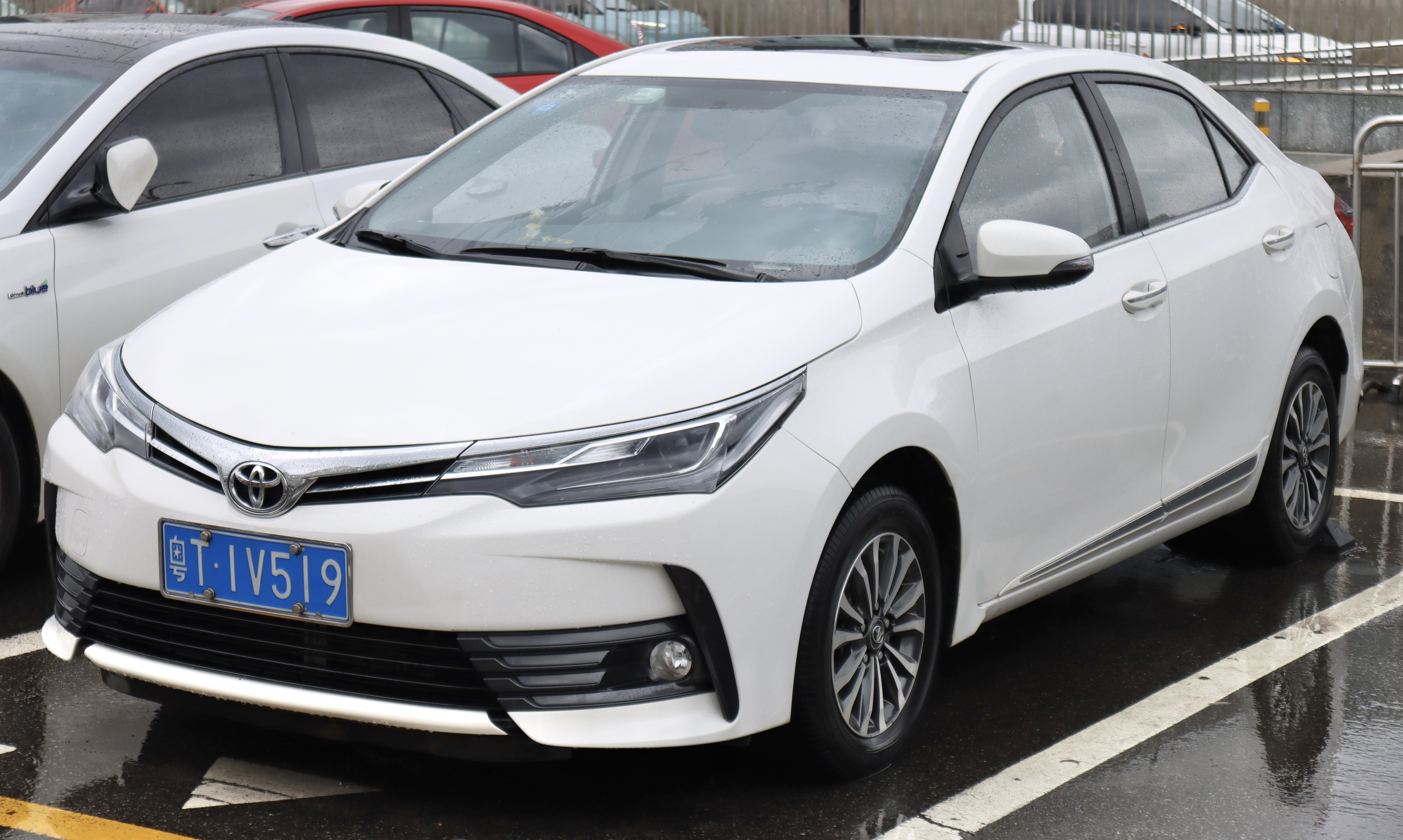
FAW-Toyota Corolla (facelift, China)

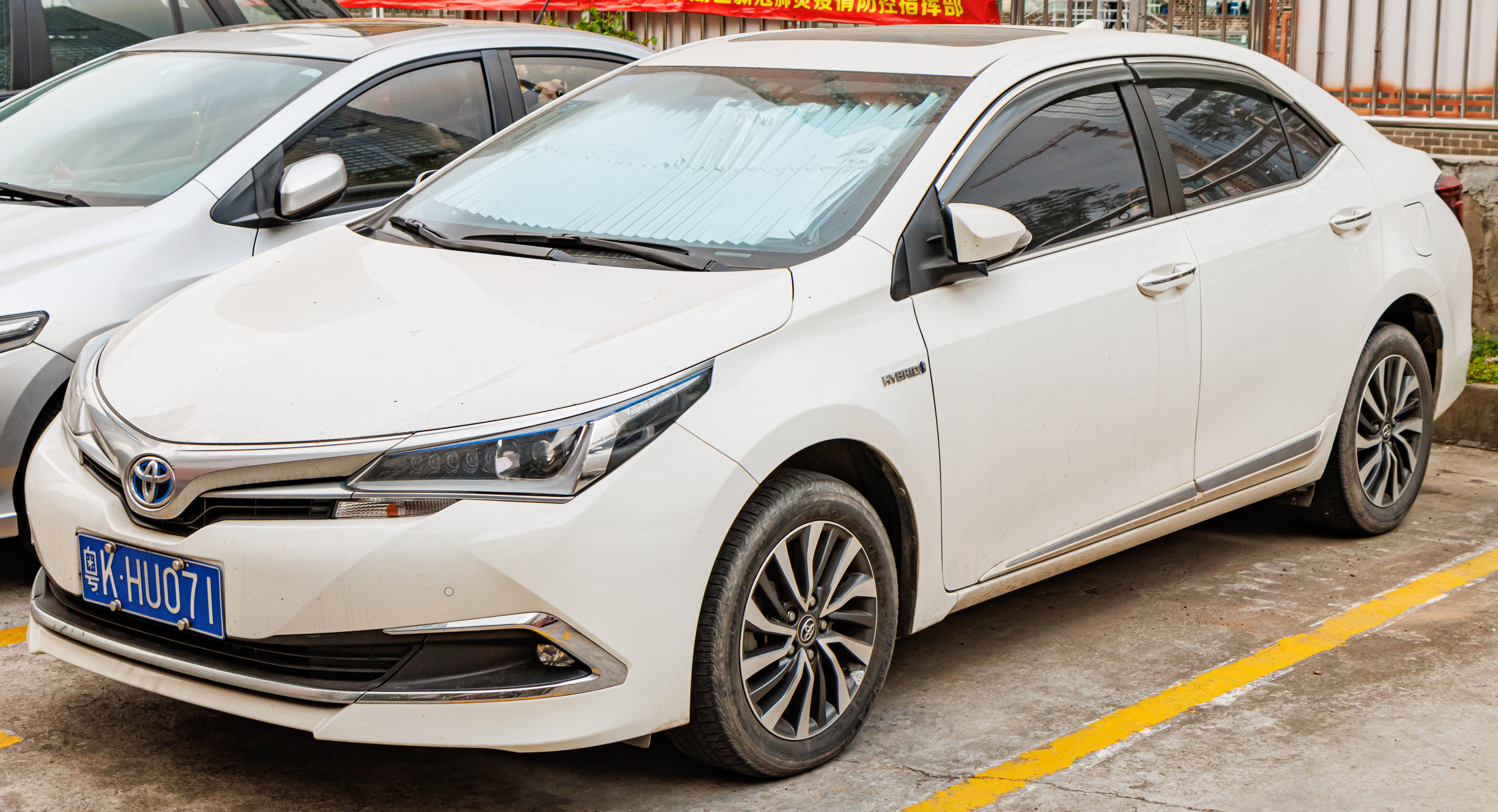
FAW-Toyota Corolla Hybrid (China)

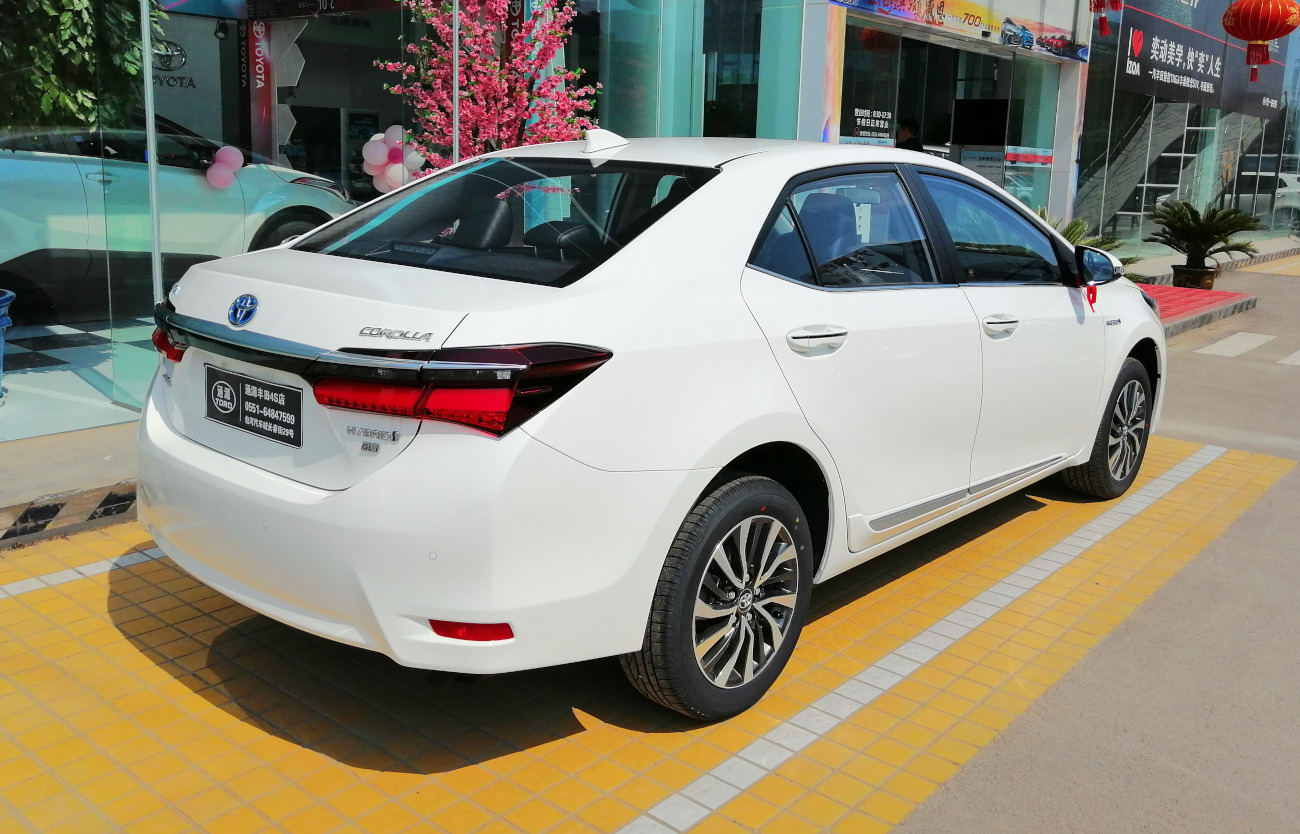
FAW-Toyota Corolla Hybrid (China)

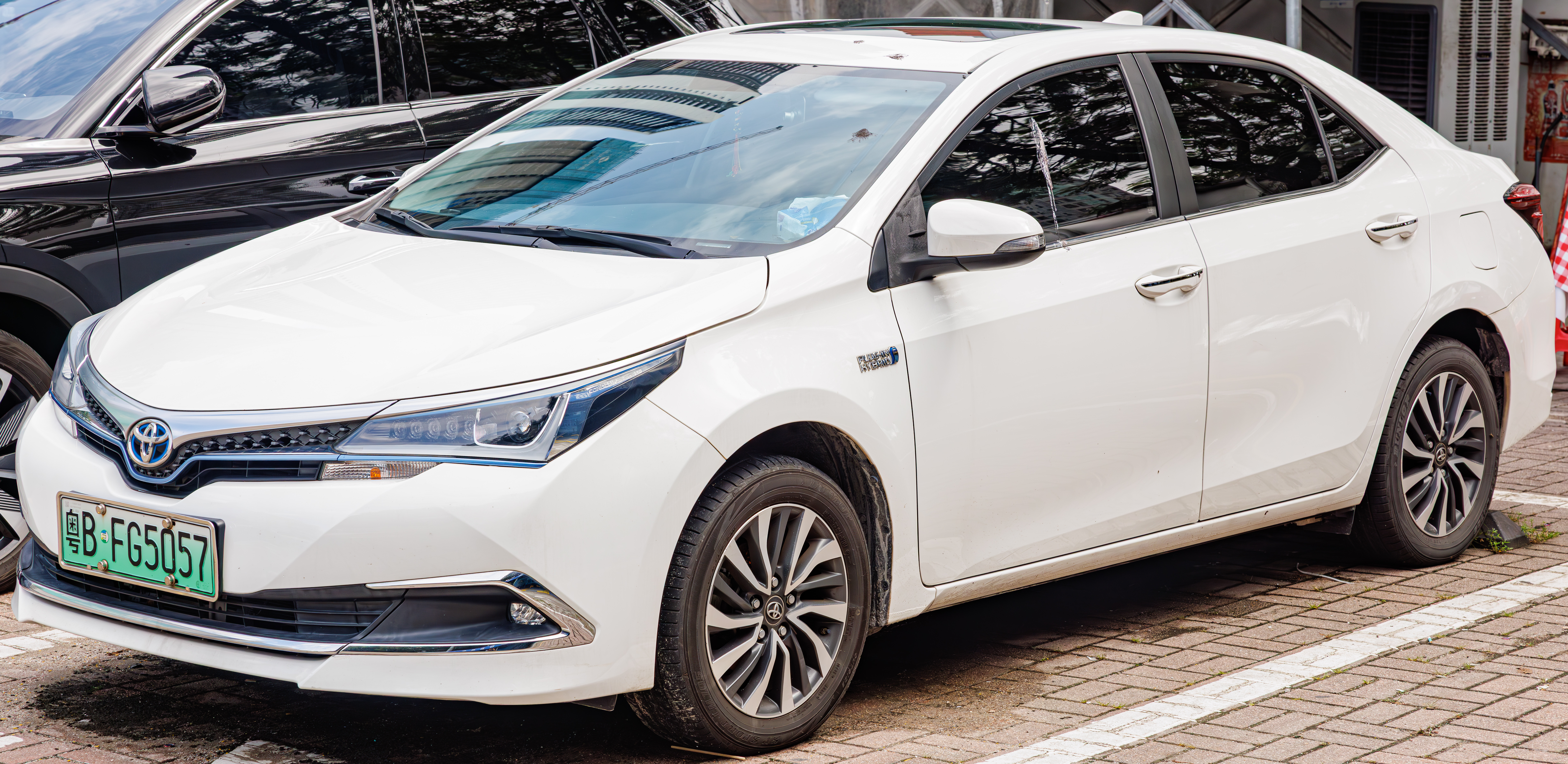
FAW-Toyota Corolla PHEV (China)

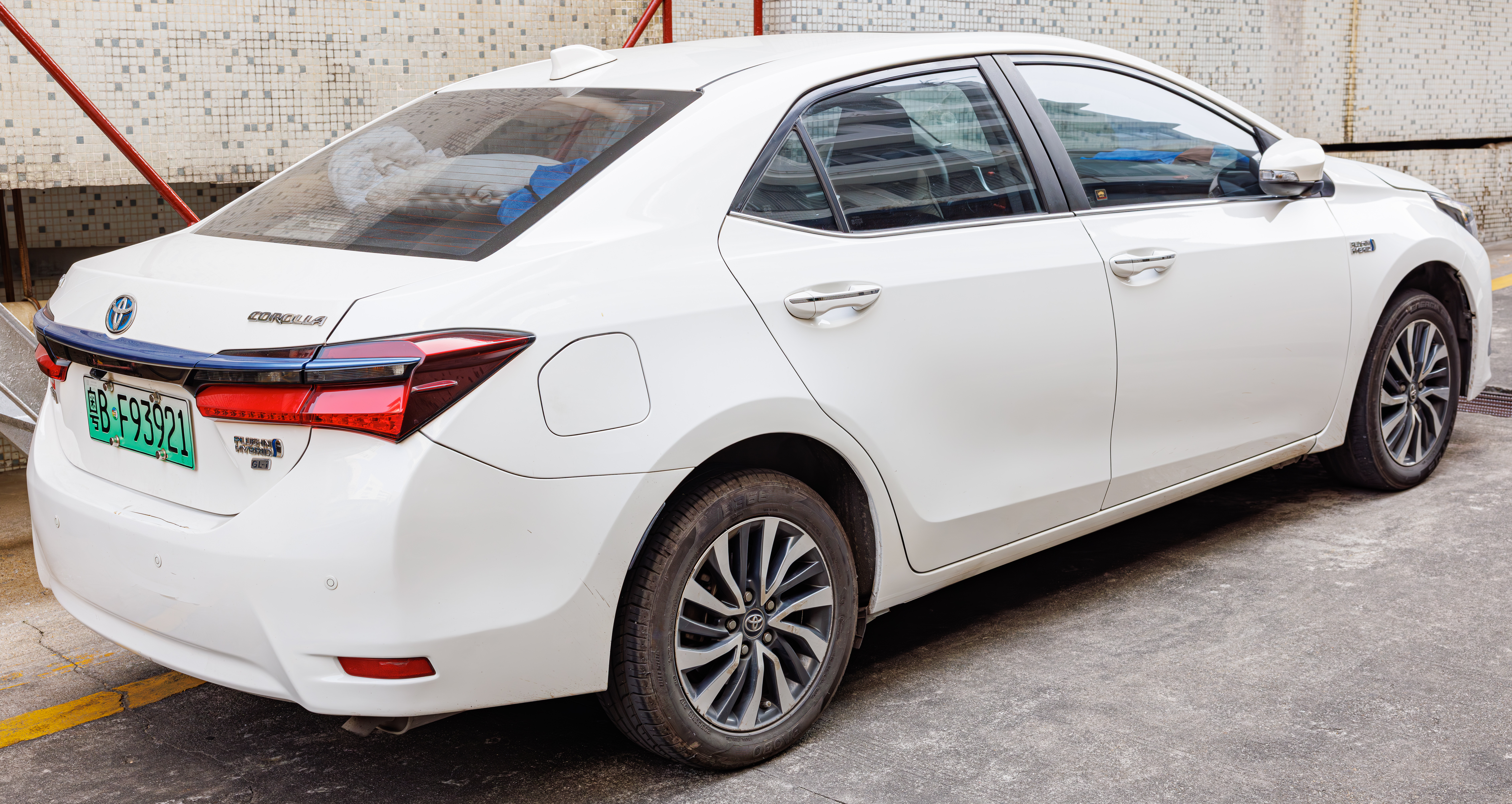
FAW-Toyota Corolla PHEV (China)

=== South Africa ===
In South Africa, the E180 Corolla was launched on 7 February 2014 with a choice of three petrol engines (1.3-, 1.6- and 1.8-litre) and a 1.4-litre D-4D diesel engine. All engines are mated to a standard six-speed manual transmission while a CVT is available for the 1.6- and 1.8-litre variants. Trim levels are the base Esteem, the mid-level Prestige, the sporty Sprinter and the top-of-the-line Exclusive. The facelifted version of the E180 Corolla went on sale on 25 January 2017. The facelifted E180 Corolla retained the pre-facelift model tail lamps for the Esteem trim and the Sprinter trim was discontinued.

On 31 January 2020, the E180 Corolla was reintroduced as the Corolla Quest and released in March 2020. It was discontinued in late 2024.

Euro NCAP test results* Toyota Corolla (2013)
Test	Points	%
Overall:	5 /5 stars	
Adult occupant:	34	94%
Child occupant:	40	82%
Pedestrian:	24	67%
Safety assist:	6	66%

=== Europe ===
In February 2014, Toyota introduced the Corolla E180 in Germany, western Europe's largest national automobile market. This marked the return of the "Corolla" badge to Germany after an absence of seven years (although the previous Corolla E150 was sold in some smaller European markets, such as Belgium). The line-up includes a 1.4-litre D-4D turbo-diesel and petrol engines ranging from a 1.33-litre Dual VVT-i engine, a 1.6-litre engine available with Dual VVT-i and Valvematic system, and a new 1.8-litre Dual VVT-i engine.

The 1.8-litre Dual VVT-i petrol engine is fitted as standard with a new Multidrive S automatic transmission. All other engines in the line-up are fitted with six-speed manual transmissions.

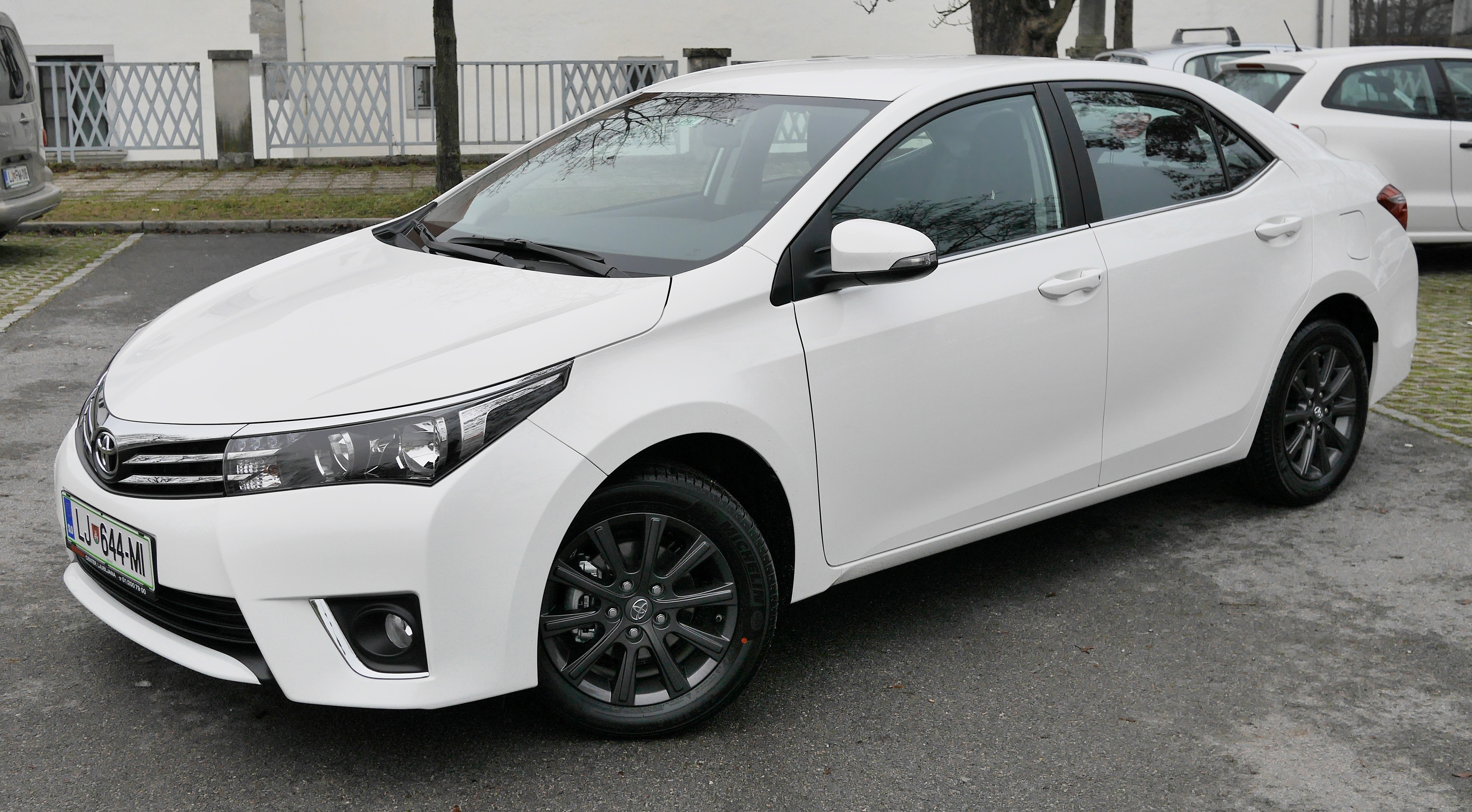
Pre-facelift

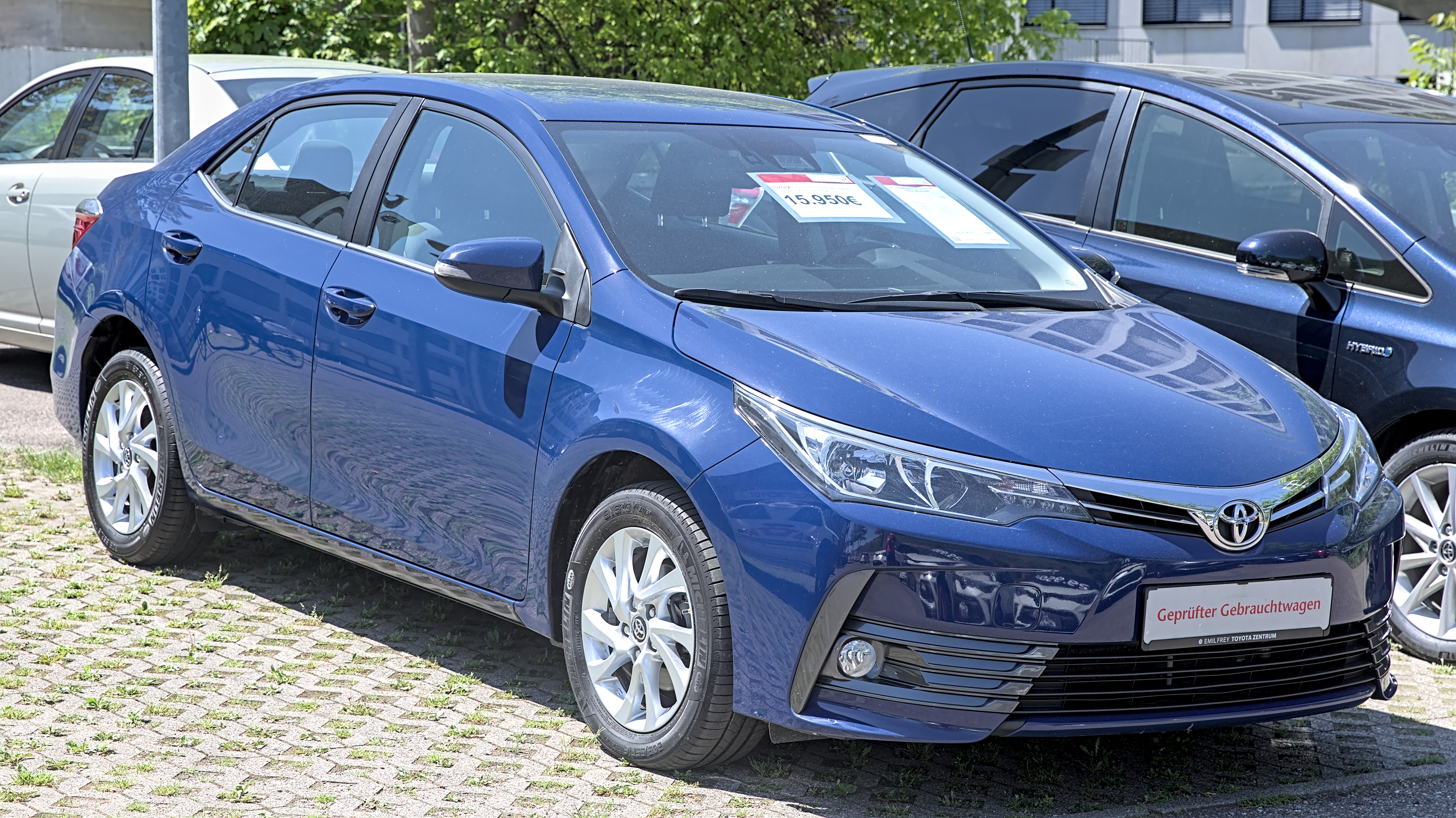
Facelift

== North American version (E170) ==
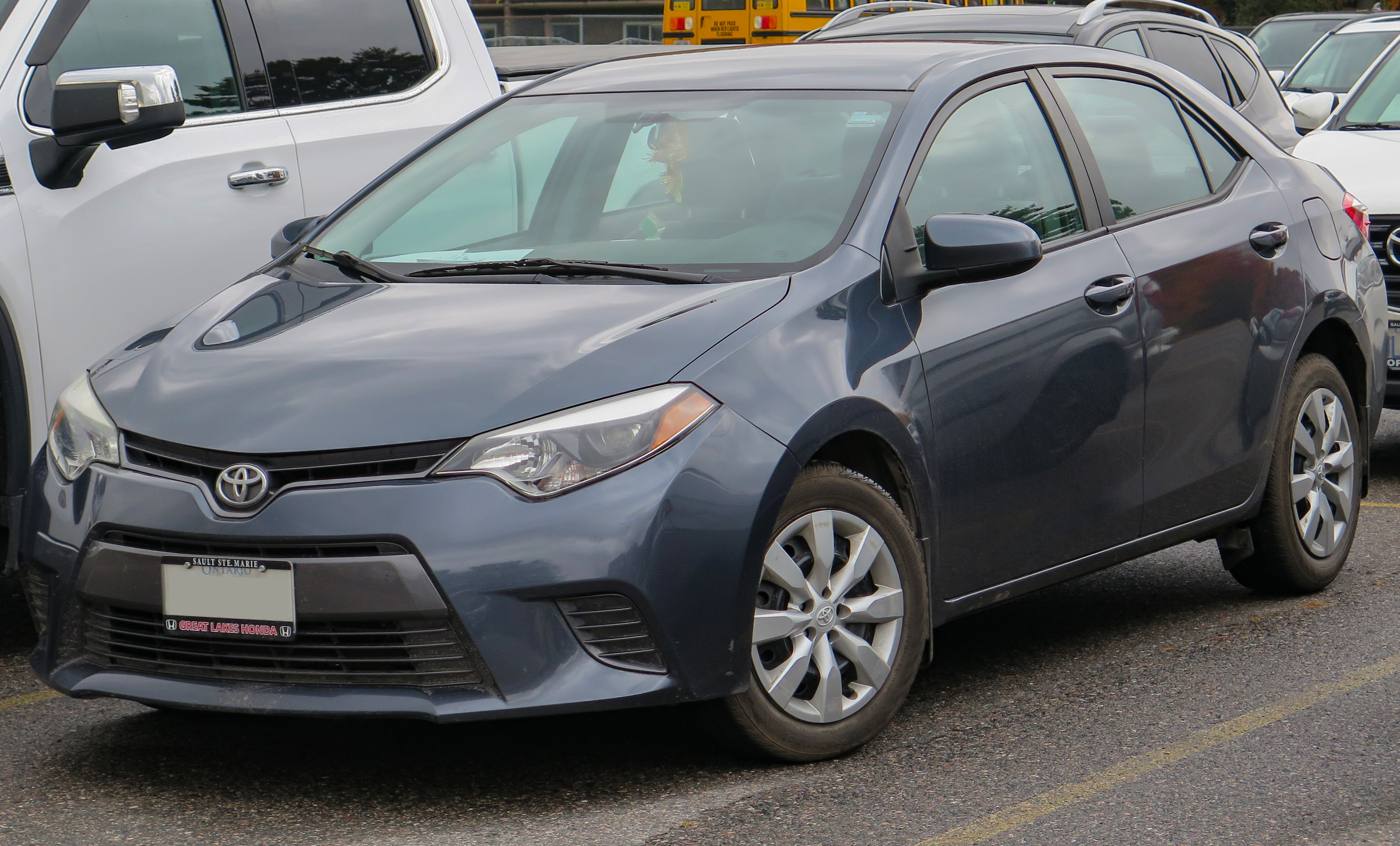
Corolla LE (ZRE172, Canada)

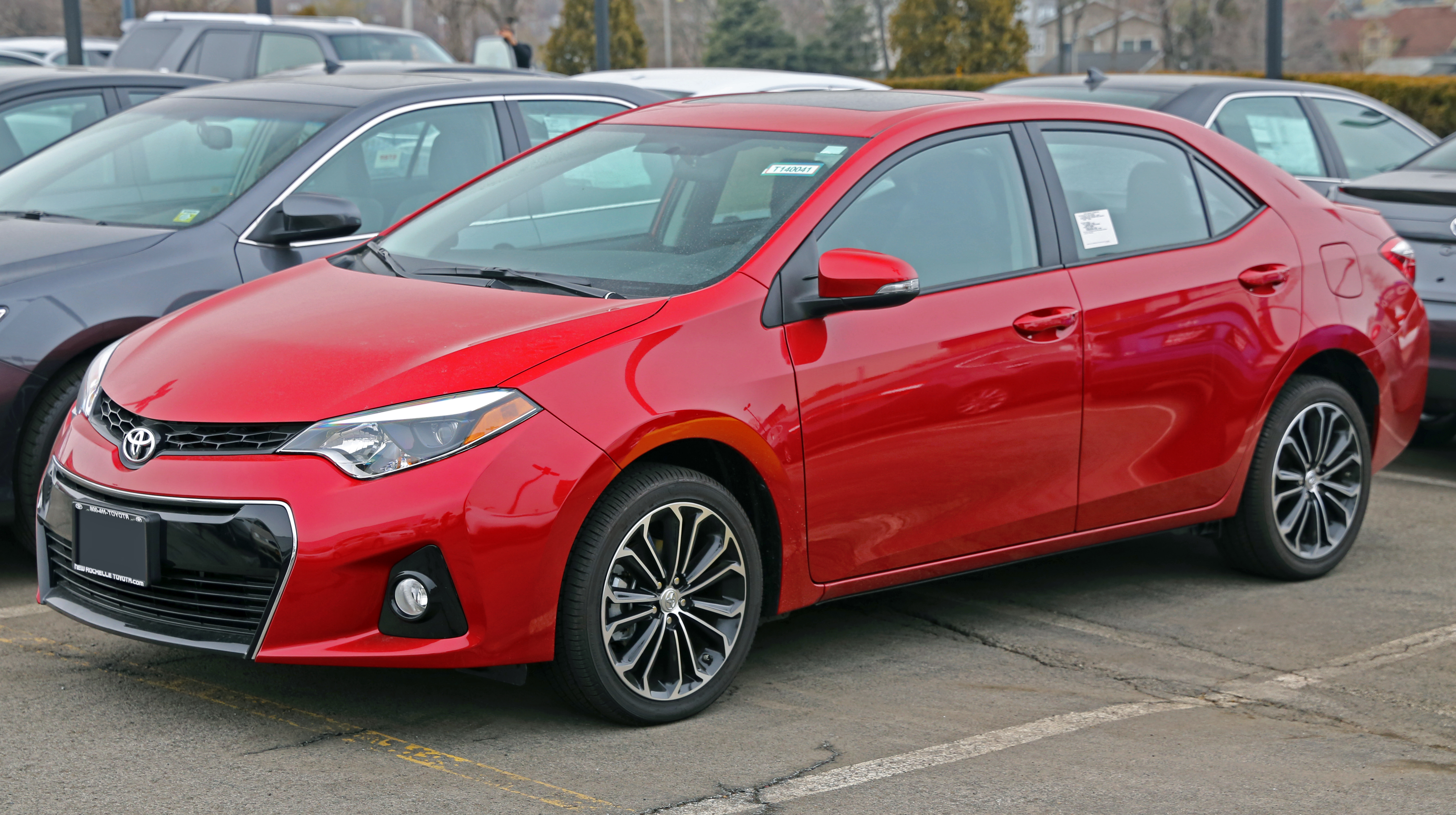
Corolla S (ZRE172, US)

The North American Corolla is very similar to the international version, except for offering revised front and rear styling. North American models were announced first on June 6, 2013; European models, announced the day after, differed mostly outside with their front-end treatment. The engines were closely related to the previous models, with only slight improvements in performance and emissions. Stylistic elements of this generation of the Corolla were previewed in the Furia concept car shown at the January 2013 Detroit Auto Show.

The eleventh generation Corolla falls under North America's compact car market segment, and it is offered in four grades: L, LE, LE Eco and S. The Corolla is a top-selling model in North America, and the world. Toyota increased fuel efficiency with this new design, while also increasing size and weight.

The Corolla manufactured in Cambridge, Ontario, Canada had about 25 percent of its parts coming from Japan.

Two, four-cylinder engines are available, the 1.8-litre 2ZR-FE with 132 horsepower (98 kW), and a Valvematic equipped 2ZR-FAE offered on the new "Eco" trim, providing 140 horsepower (100 kW). The Corolla is available with a four-speed automatic, six-speed manual, or Toyota's CVTi-S Continuously-Variable Transmission.

The brakes are a 275 mm (10.8 in) ventilated front disc, and a 229 mm (9.0 in) rear drum with the option of a 259 mm (10.2 in) solid rear disc on the S trim. It features Toyota's Star Safety System as standard, including Vehicle Stability Control (VSC), Traction Control (TRAC), Anti-lock Braking System (ABS), Electronic Brake-force Distribution (EBD) and Brake Assist. Smart Stop Technology brake override system is also included standard, as well as an electronic tire pressure monitoring system (TPMS).

The standard wheels on the L and LE Eco grades are 15-inch covered steel, with 16-inch wheels on the LE and S. Different 16-inch aluminium alloy wheels are offered on the LE, and LE Eco, and 17-inch alloy wheels are offered on the S. The tire on the LE Eco are low rolling resistance 195/65R-15 rubber. The S 17-inch option offers 215/45R-17 rubber. For the LE, and on the alloy option for the LE Eco model, a 205/55R-16 tire is used.

The Corolla offers two engine selections, both all aluminium, 1.8-litre inline four cylinder engines. With the exception of the LE Eco trim, the 1.8-litre engine is equipped with dual Intelligent VVT-i variable valve timing, producing 98 kW (132 hp). The LE Eco model has a 104 kW (140 hp) engine featuring Toyota's Valvematic option, which improves the Eco model's fuel efficiency. Valvematic offers a broader range of continuously variable valve timing (lift and phasing) over VVT-i, providing more optimal intake valve (not on exhaust side) operation relative to engine demands conferring a five-percent improvement in fuel economy and engine output. The Eco model's engine also has an increased compression ratio of 10.6:1.

The base model Corolla L is offered with a four-speed automatic transmission or a six-speed manual transmission. The six-speed manual is also available in the Corolla S.

Toyota offers a continuously variable transmission on the LE, LE Eco and S trims, named the CVTi-S (Continuously Variable Transmission intelligent-shift). The transmission's software creates discrete sequential shift points to emulate traditional transmissions while accelerating. The S trim offers a manual-mode shift gate in the console shifter, or paddle shifters on the steering wheel allowing sequential "shifts" through 7 speeds. On the LE Eco, the transmission has an ECO driving mode.

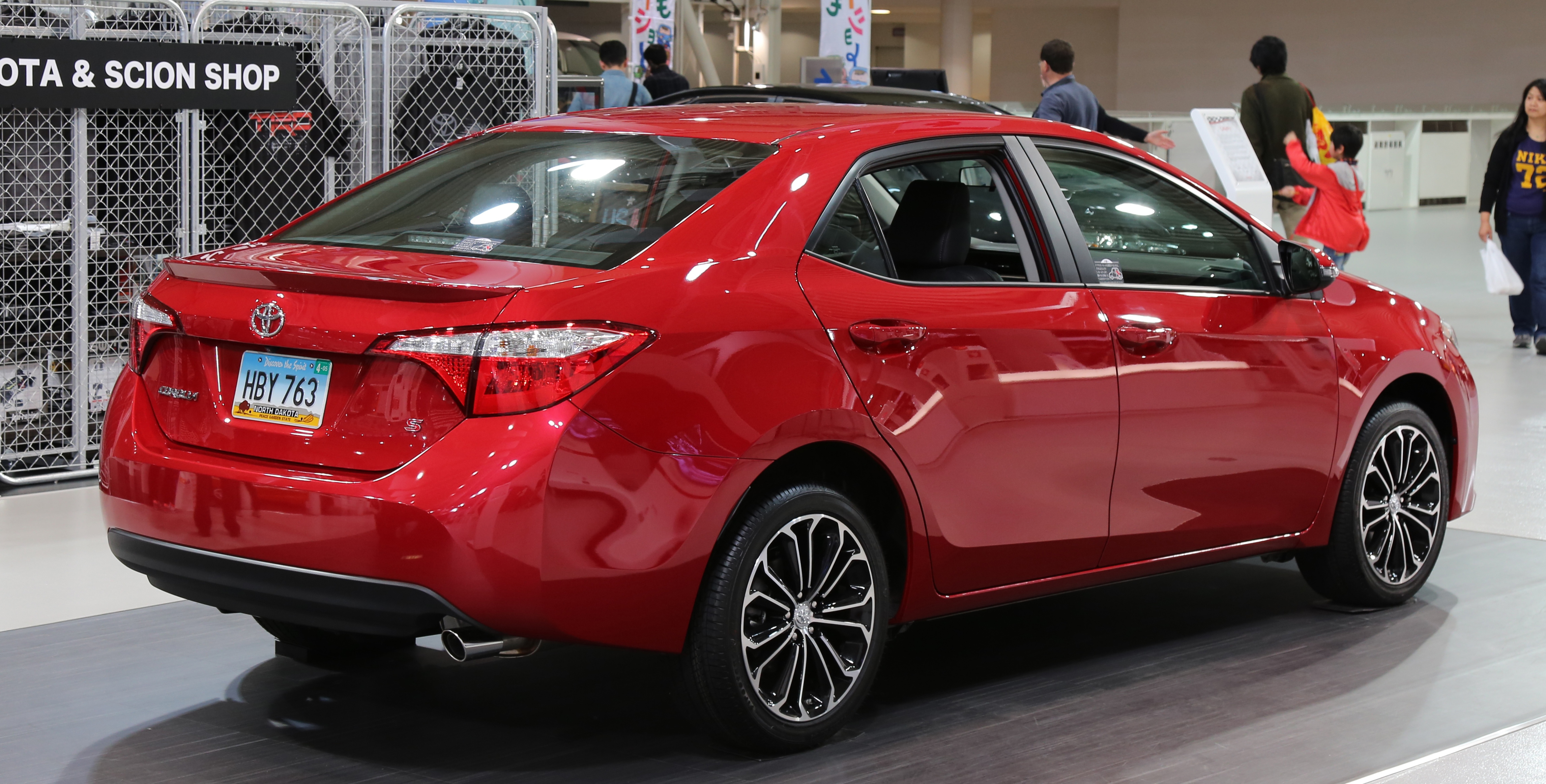
2015 Corolla S (ZRE172)

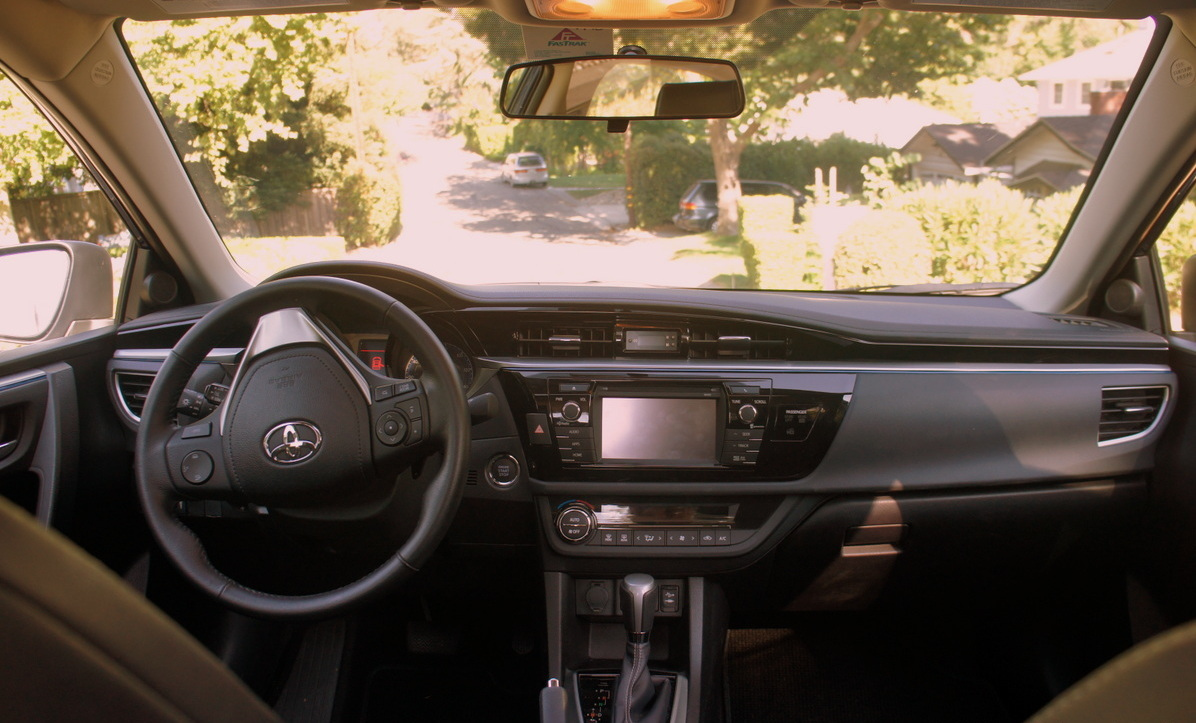
Interior

The front suspension uses MacPherson struts with a more rigid control-arm design, while the rear uses a torsion beam arrangement. The spring rates on Corolla are relaxed, but the S model equipped with 17-inch wheels includes unique coil, damper, and bushing tuning to offer stiffer handling. The rear torsion beam's attachments points are now fastened to the body at a slanted, diagonal angle for its bushings, a departure from the traditional straight attachment orientation; the layout contributes improves grip, and stability.

=== Safety ===
The Corolla in its most basic Latin American market configuration with 3 airbags received 5 stars for adult occupants and 4 stars for toddlers from Latin NCAP 1.0 in 2014.

Latin NCAP 1.5 test results Toyota Corolla + 3 Airbags (2014, similar to Euro NCAP 2002)
Test	Points	Stars
Adult occupant:	15.83/17.0	5 /5 stars
Child occupant:	41.25/49.00	4 /5 stars

The Corolla in its most basic Latin American market configuration with 7 airbags received 5 stars for adult occupants, 5 stars for toddlers, and Advanced Award from Latin NCAP 2.0 in 2017.

Latin NCAP 2.0 test results Toyota Corolla + 7 Airbags (2017, based on Euro NCAP 2008)
Test	Points	Stars
Adult occupant:	29.60/34.0	5 /5 stars
Child occupant:	44.88/49.00	5 /5 stars

=== Special Edition ===
In 2014, for the 2015 model year, Toyota released the Special Edition Corolla based on the S model. It has gloss black-painted 17-inch alloy wheels, red stitching on its black steering wheel, shift knob, door trim, and seats, Special Edition floor mats and boot emblem. In Canada, this model is called the 50th Anniversary Limited Edition. Absolutely Red, Super White, and Black Sand Pearl are the only exterior colours offered.

=== Facelift ===
In 2016, for the 2017 model year, Toyota released the facelift version of the E170 Corolla with new aerodynamic scoops, (only for 50th anniversary edition) restyled front facia, including new headlight design; redesigned taillights also featured. The interior added a new seven-inch touch screen and four-inch multi-information display. The updated Corolla features the new SE and XSE grades, and new exterior colours.

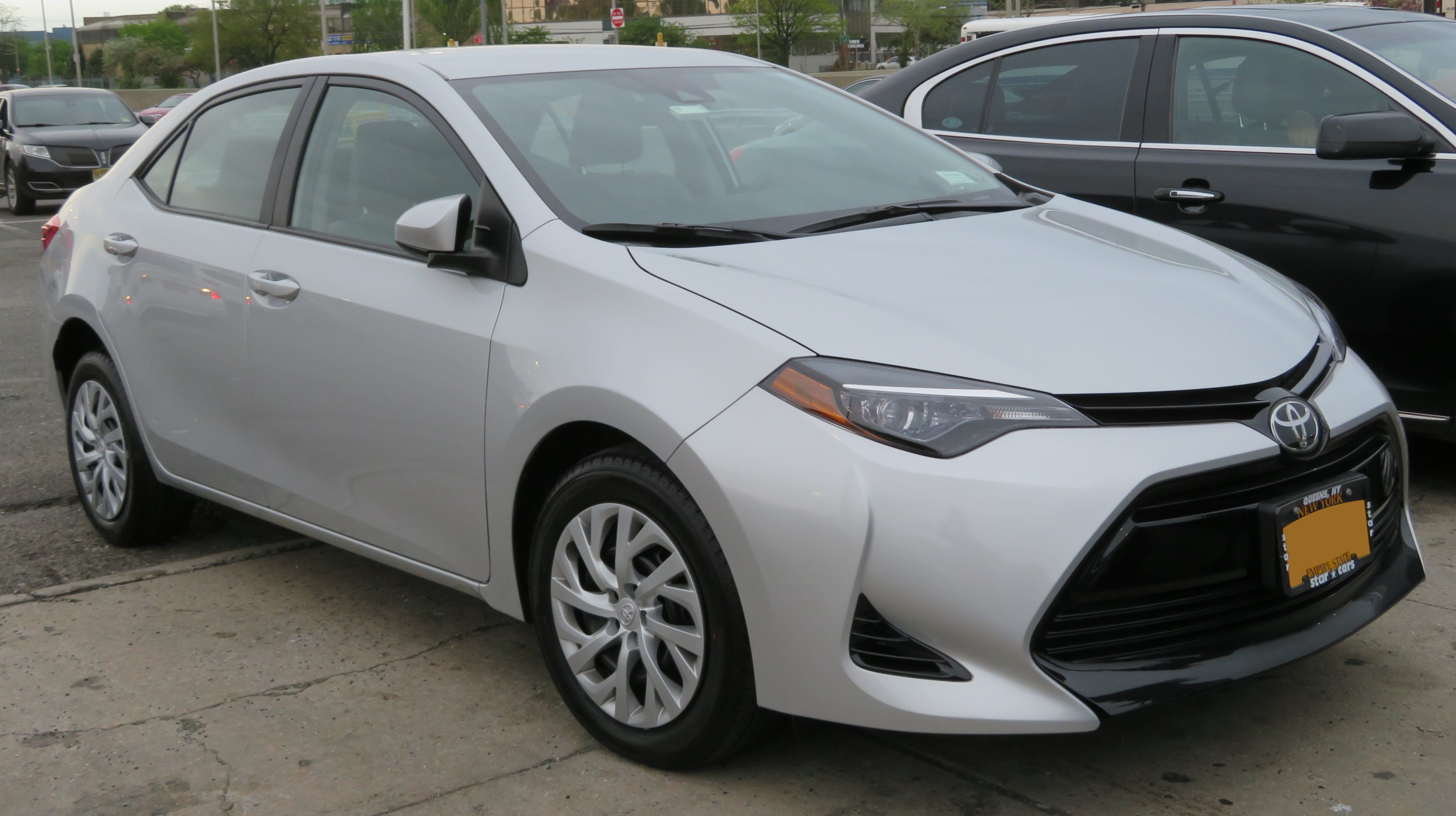
Facelifted American version E170 Corolla LE

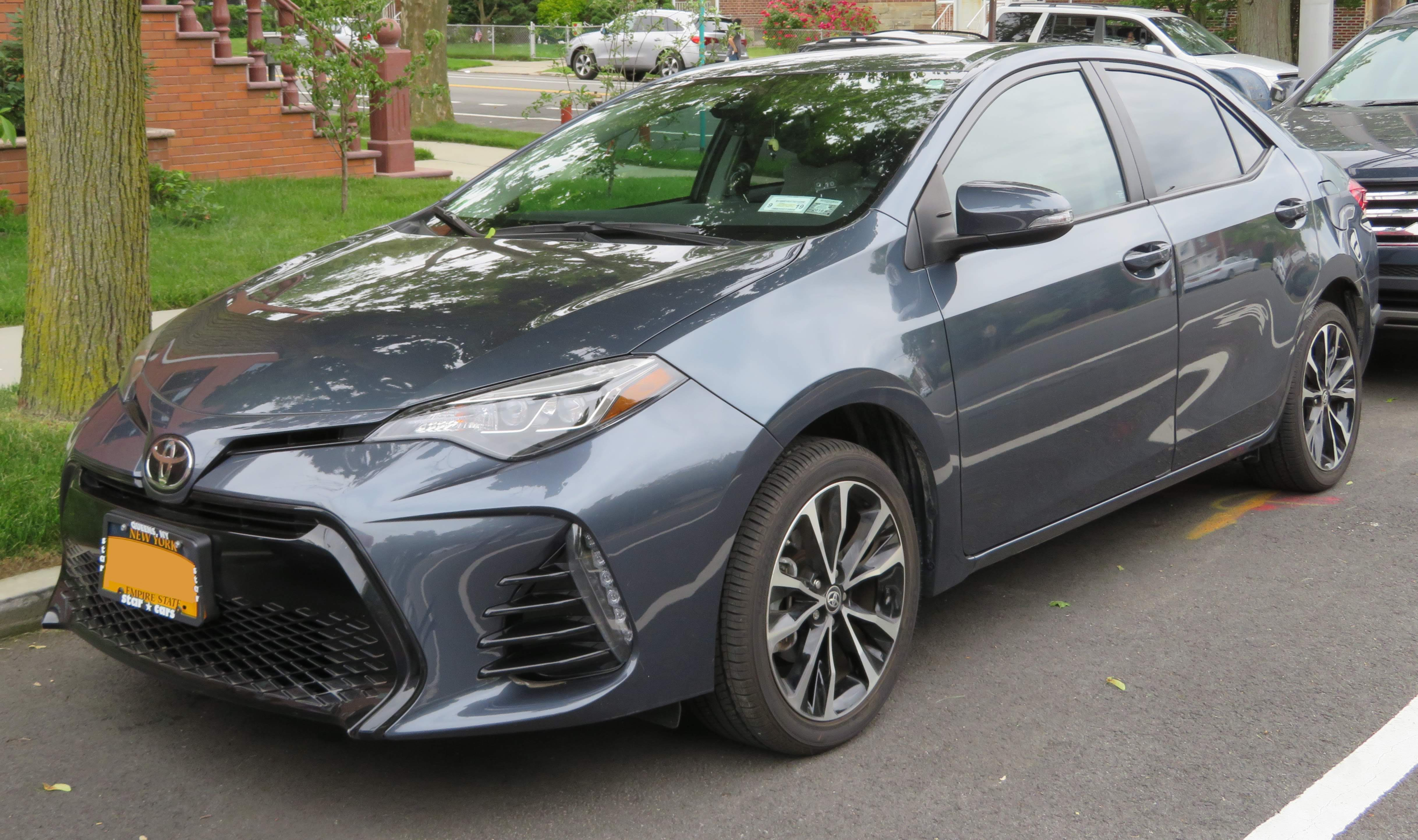
Facelifted American version E170 Corolla SE

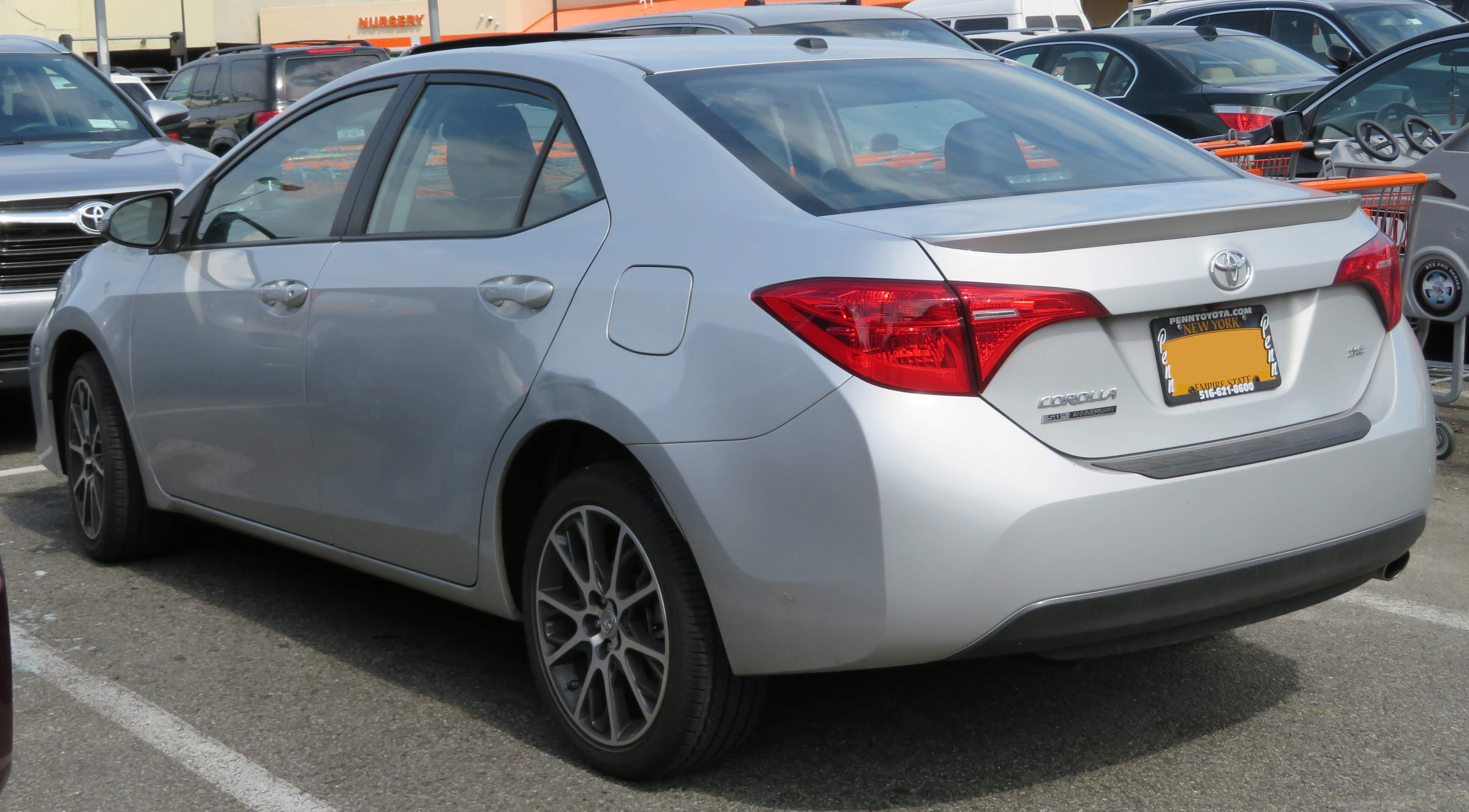
Facelifted American version E170 Corolla SE

== Toyota Levin (E180) ==
In addition to the FAW-Toyota Corolla sold in China that is based on the Corolla Altis, in 2014 Toyota China released the GAC-Toyota Levin (Chinese: 雷凌; pinyin: Léilíng). In October 2015, Toyota introduced the Corolla hybrid variant in China with locally produced hybrid systems.

The Levin has different frontal styling compared to both the North American Corolla and the international version. The grille is a slim piece dominated by chrome strip along the top that continues above the headlamps (that have been designed as a cross between the North American Corolla's lights and the international Corolla's wraparound units). The lower intake is trapezoidal-shaped like the regular (non-sport) grade North American Corolla, but for China, features a chrome surround. At the rear, the Levin's lights are based on the North American Corolla—the rear three-quarter panels and bumper are identical. The reshaped boot lid has the Toyota logo moved upwards to make way for the dominating chrome strip that bridges the tail lamps. The outer portions of the Levin's tail-lamps are the same shape as the Corolla for North America. The inner portion that sits upon the boot lid is resigned. Also, the North American Corolla's tailpipe pokes straight out from underneath the rear bumper; the Levin's tailpipe curves downwards.

The Levin received an update at the Auto Shanghai in April 2017, with the similar front bumper design as the updated Taiwanese market Corolla Altis X.

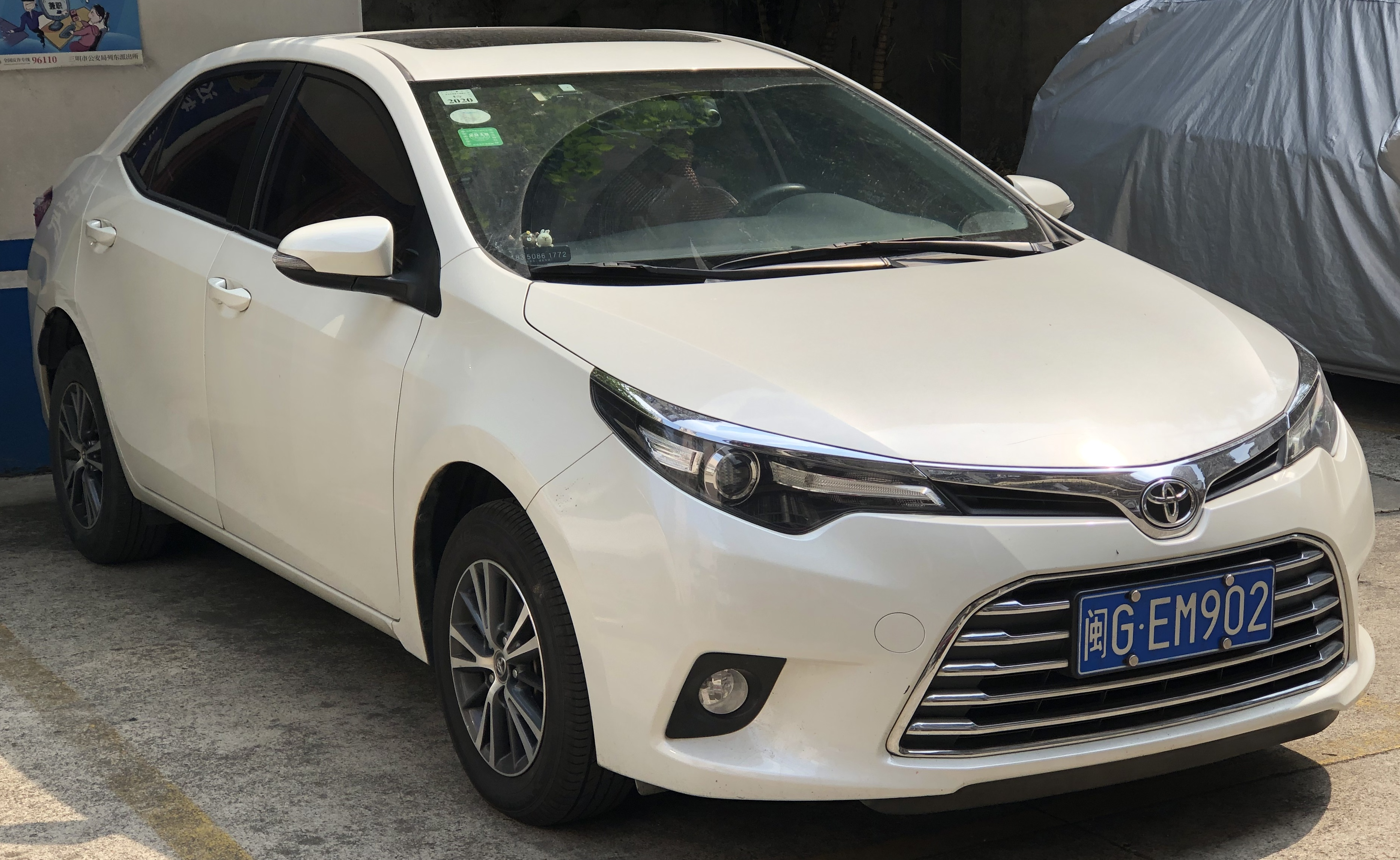
GAC-Toyota Levin (pre-facelift, China)

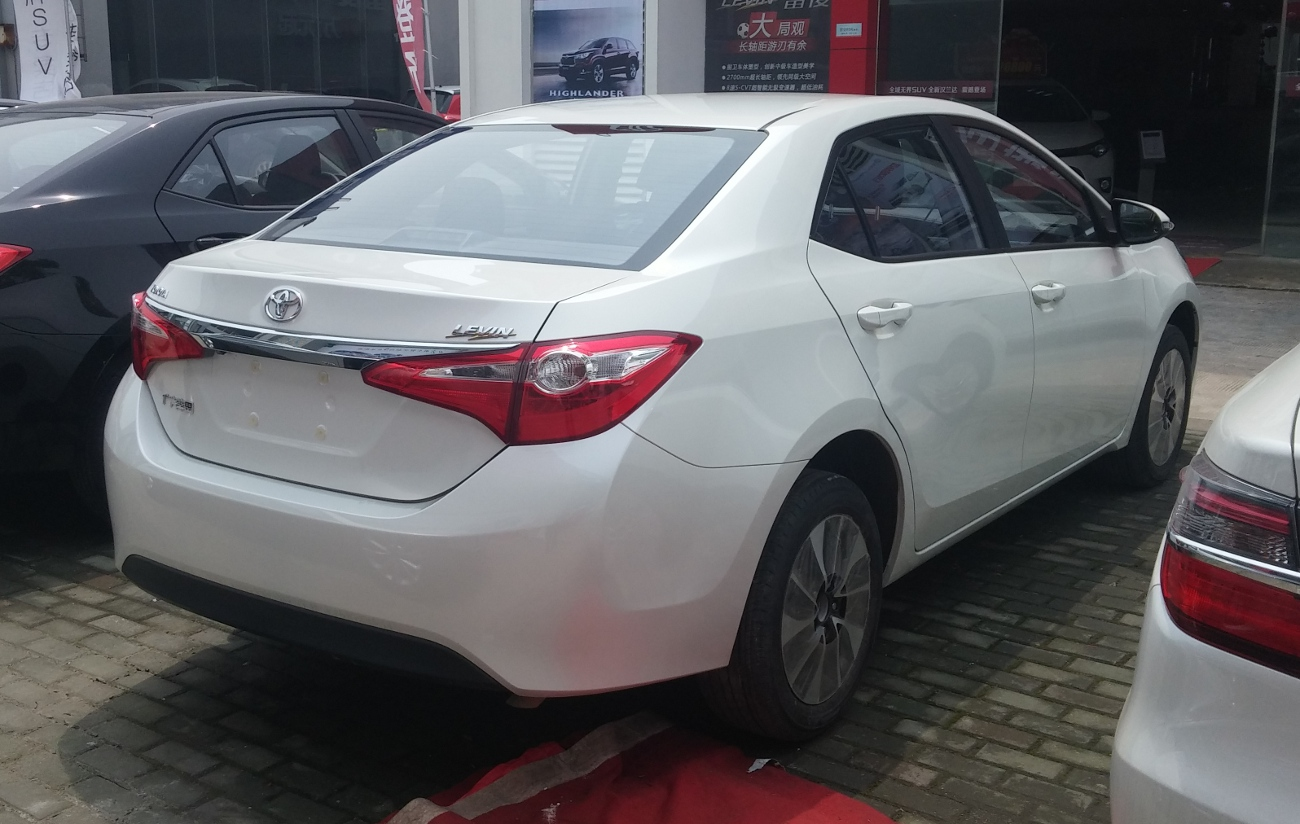
GAC-Toyota Levin (pre-facelift, China)

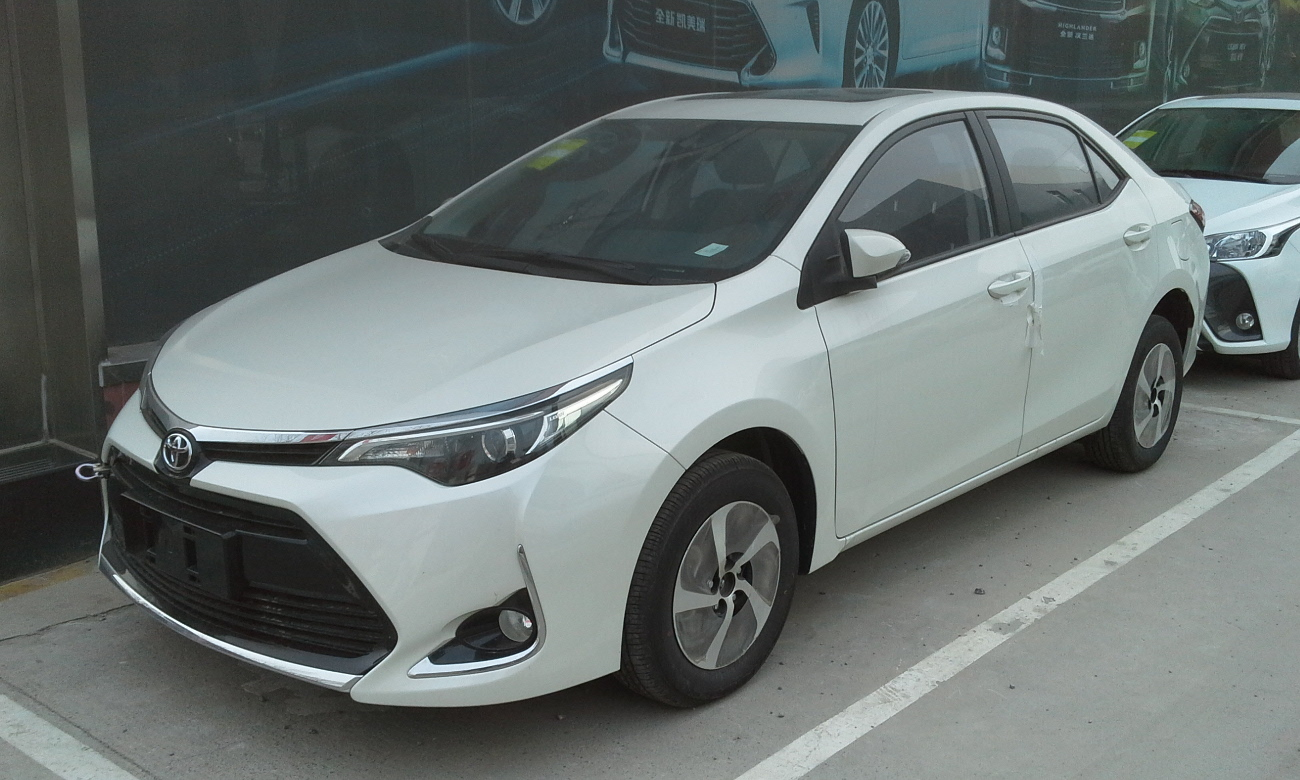
GAC-Toyota Levin (facelift, China)

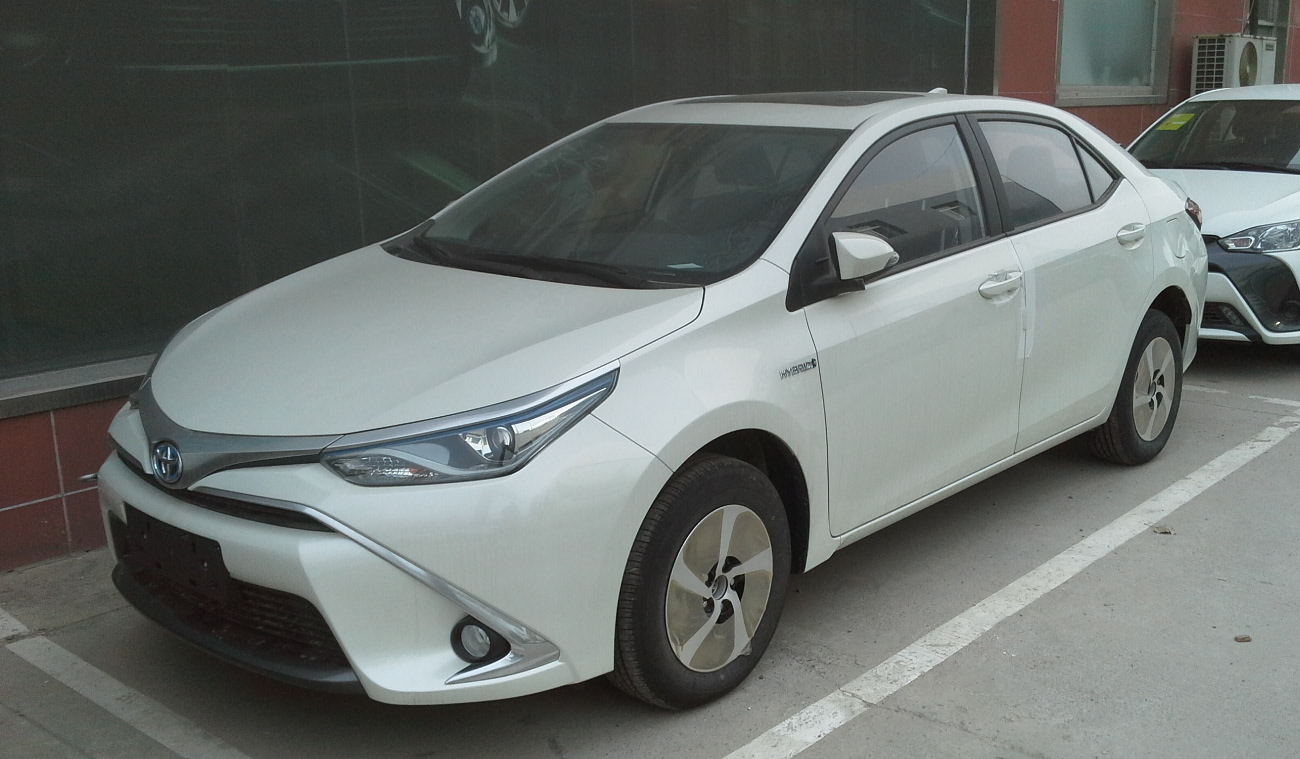
GAC-Toyota Levin Hybrid (China)

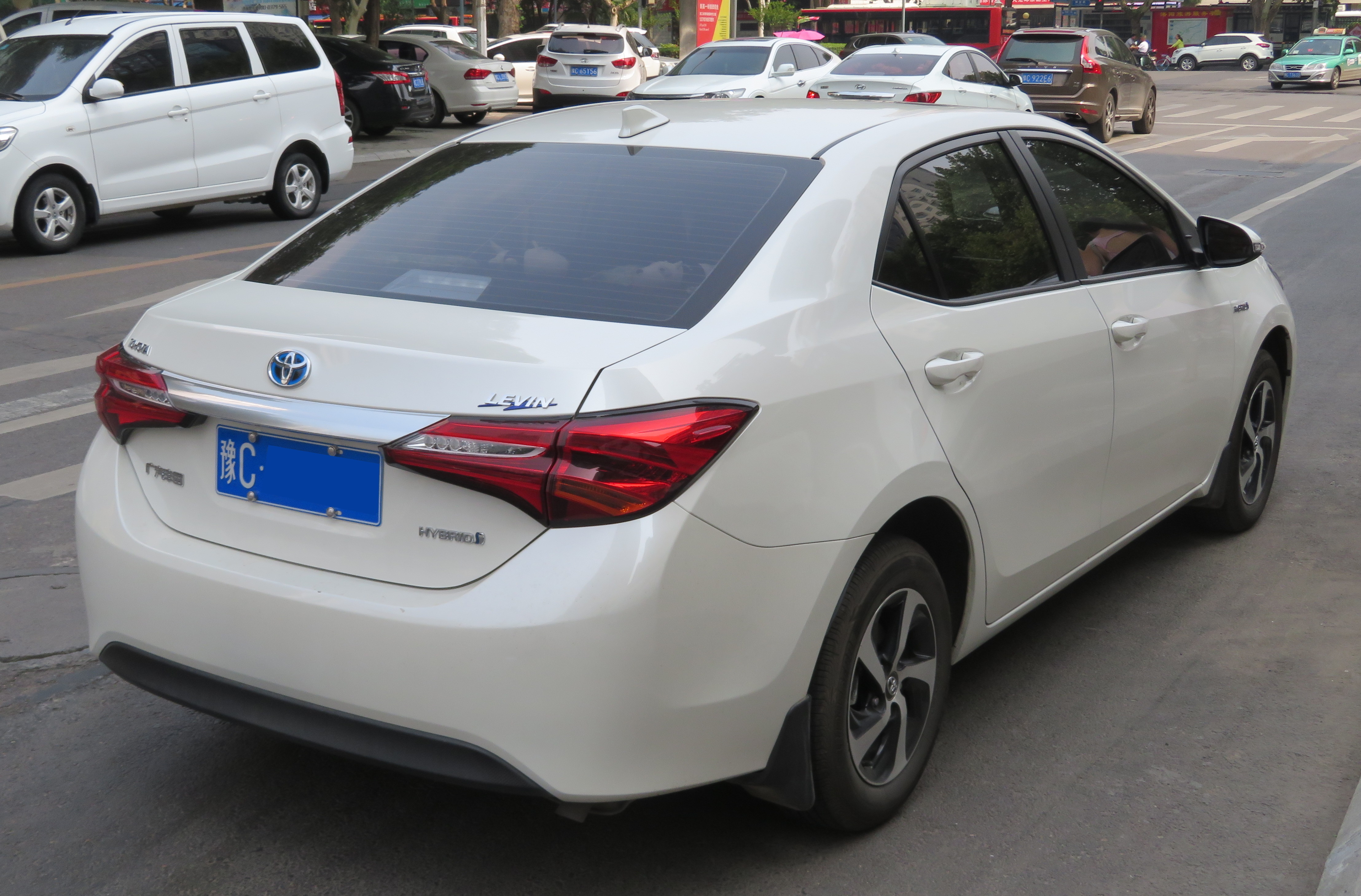
GAC-Toyota Levin Hybrid (China)

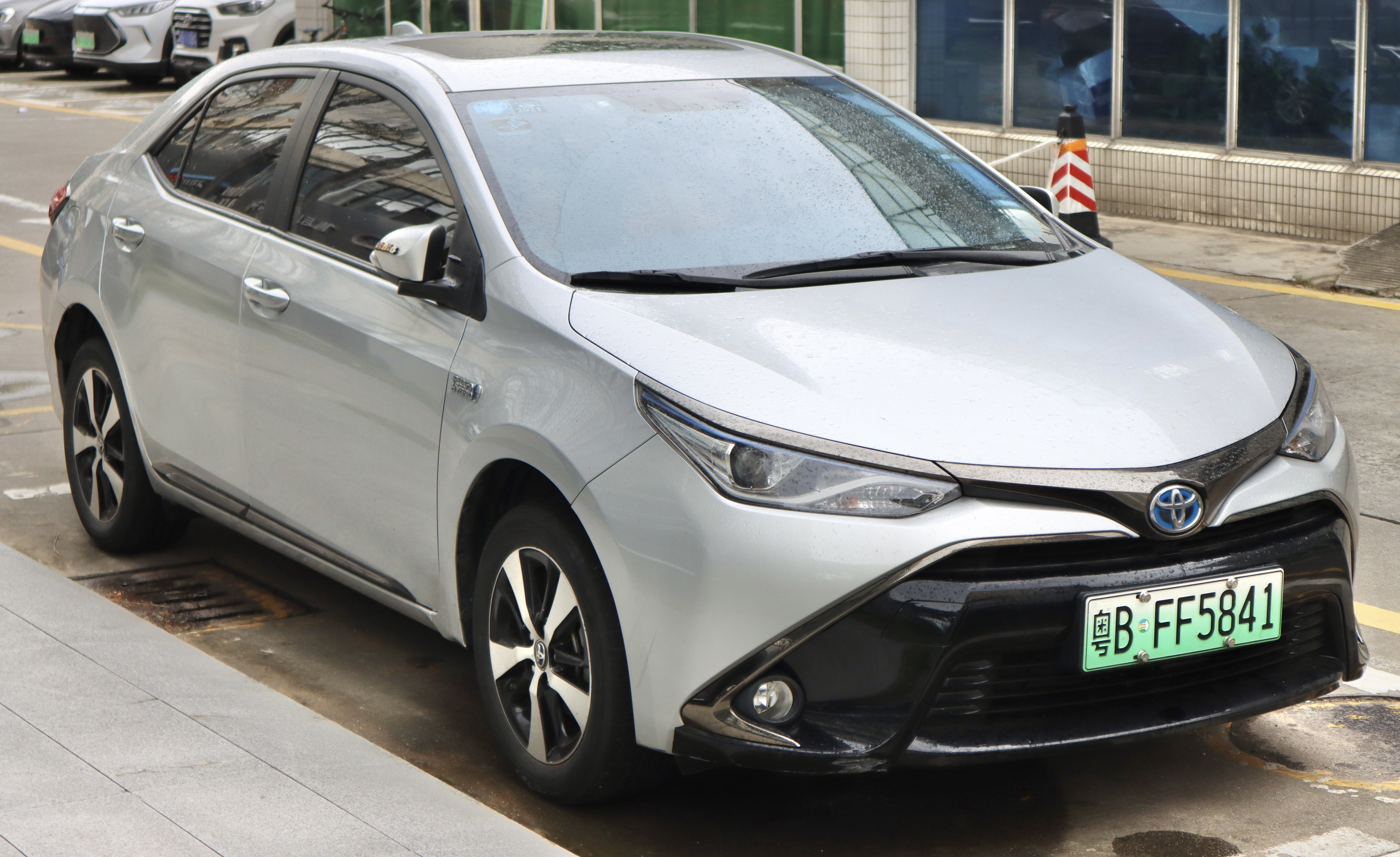
GAC-Toyota Levin PHEV (China)

Preceded by Corolla (E140/150)	Toyota Corolla (E170/180); 2013–present	Succeeded by Corolla (E210)
