= E170 =

E170 may refer to:

- Model E-170 Regional Jet, see Embraer E-Jets
- The E number of a food additive or colouring for calcium carbonate or chalk
- Toyota Corolla (E170), a car
