= Taxis by country =

Taxis within a country often share common properties, but there is a wide variation from country to country in the vehicles used, the circumstances under which they may be hired and the regulatory regime to which these are subject.

== Africa ==
=== Egypt ===
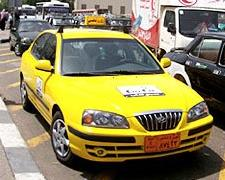
Hyundai Elantra taxicab in Cairo

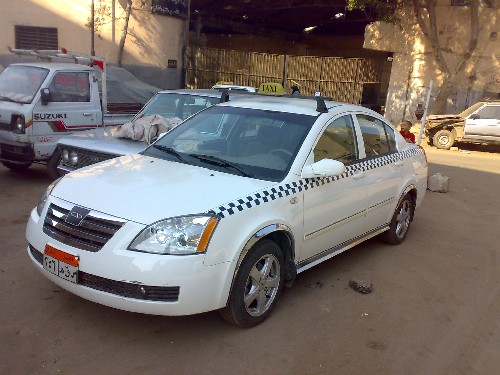
Chery A5 Cairo taxi

Taxicabs are common in Egypt, particularly in the larger cities. The taxi system is highly decentralized, with the cab generally belonging to the driver and operated as a private business by him. Consequently, there is some variation in the types of cars used as taxis, although the Tofaş Şahin (including the licensed version produced by Nasr) and Hyundai Accent predominate.

Drivers must obtain a taxi license from the government, generally through the offices of the Governorate in which they are based; however, taxis are permitted to operate between cities. Drivers must also paint their cars according to a livery unique to each governorate, including painting the license plate number of the cab on its doors in both Arabic and English.

The traditional liveries of Cairo (black and white) and Alexandria (yellow and black) are well known to all Egyptians and indeed across the Arab world from their appearance in Egyptian film and television.

Meters are technically required by Egyptian law, but they generally go unused and in many cases do not even work. The prime exception is in Cairo, where a new class of taxis with a different livery (white with a black checkered band around the middle) have electronic meters installed and used. In most other cases, the price of a journey is generally determined through negotiation or bargaining between the passenger and driver, either just after the cab is hailed or just after the destination is reached.

Many if not most Egyptian taxi drivers have some education and frequently work in white-collar professions that nevertheless come with low pay (generally low-level government work, including education); taxis are a common source of supplemental income for many Egyptian families. Consequently, taxi drivers are a common source of vox populi for foreign media sources.

=== Eritrea ===
In Eritrea all taxis are yellow. In the capital, Asmara, they are all new yellow Kia, Toyota, and Mercedes-Benz. There are often five passenger seats. The taxis are owned by the same company all over Asmara. The taxi traffic starts slowing down after 9 pm in the northernmost part of the city's suburbs, but the inner city and southern side of the town have a lot of taxis. The taxis in Massawa are often large like minibusses, but are still taxis. They are also yellow.

=== Ghana ===
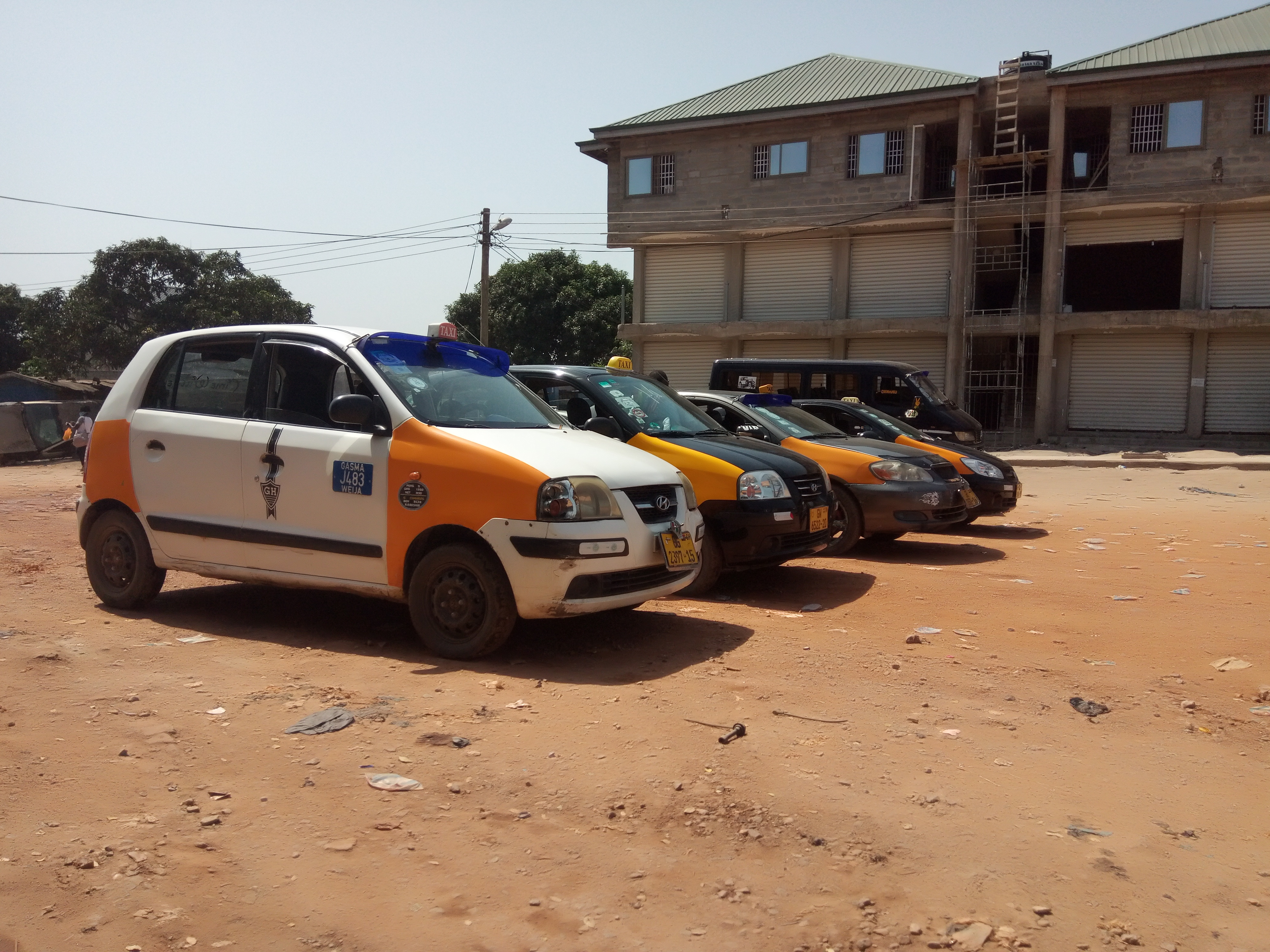
Taxis in Ghana

Most taxis in Ghana have orange coloured wing panels. According to some observers, the vast majority of vehicles on the roads are taxis. Taxis either take a customer anywhere on a pre-negotiated fare, or pick up passengers for a fixed fare on a specific route.

=== Kenya ===
Matatus are a uniquely homegrown transportation industry in Kenya, evolving from informal services in the 1950s and 1960s to a significant economic enterprise today.Originating to serve areas neglected by colonial bus systems, the name "matatu" derives from the Kikuyu term mang'otore matatu, referencing the historical thirty-cents fare. The industry is largely locally owned, employing a significant portion of Kenya's informal sector workforce. Early vehicles were basic, contrasting with modern matatus featuring elaborate art and customization. These vehicles also function as social spaces, reflecting and shaping urban socio-political dynamics. Challenges include tensions with government regulation and difficult labor conditions marked by corruption and lack of formal protections.

=== Madagascar ===
In Madagascar, the most common taxicabs found in the country are the cream coloured Citroën 2CVs and the yellow coloured Renault 4s.

=== Republic of the Congo (Congo-Brazzaville) ===
Taxicabs in the Republic of the Congo are almost exclusively Toyota, often old cars imported from Asia or Europe. In Brazzaville, taxis are green and white. In the second largest city in the country, Pointe-Noire, taxis are blue and white.

=== South Africa ===
South Africa has three main kinds of taxis:

- Minibus taxis, which are vehicles specifically built for carrying many passengers. Along with buses and trains, they form the bulk of public transit in SA. The traditionally used vehicle is a 16-seater Toyota Ses’fikile, which is a specially-produced variant of the 5th generation (H200) HiAce, manufactured locally by Toyota South Africa Motors. They are made to meet the regulatory requirements of the South African taxi market.
- E-hailing services, via apps such as Uber and Bolt. Since 2025, the South African Government has mandated that e-hailing drivers operate within the specific jurisdictions for which they are registered. These companies use a variety of cars. Budget e-hailing vehicles include the Toyota Corolla, Suzuki Ciaz, Kia Cerato, Honda Amaze, and Kia Seltos. Upmarket e-hailing vehicles include the Lexus RX, Lexus LX, Mercedes Benz S-Class, Volvo XC90, and BMW X5.
- Meter taxis, which are hailed by calling a local company of choice. These operate point-to-point services, and commonly use Toyota Avanzas.
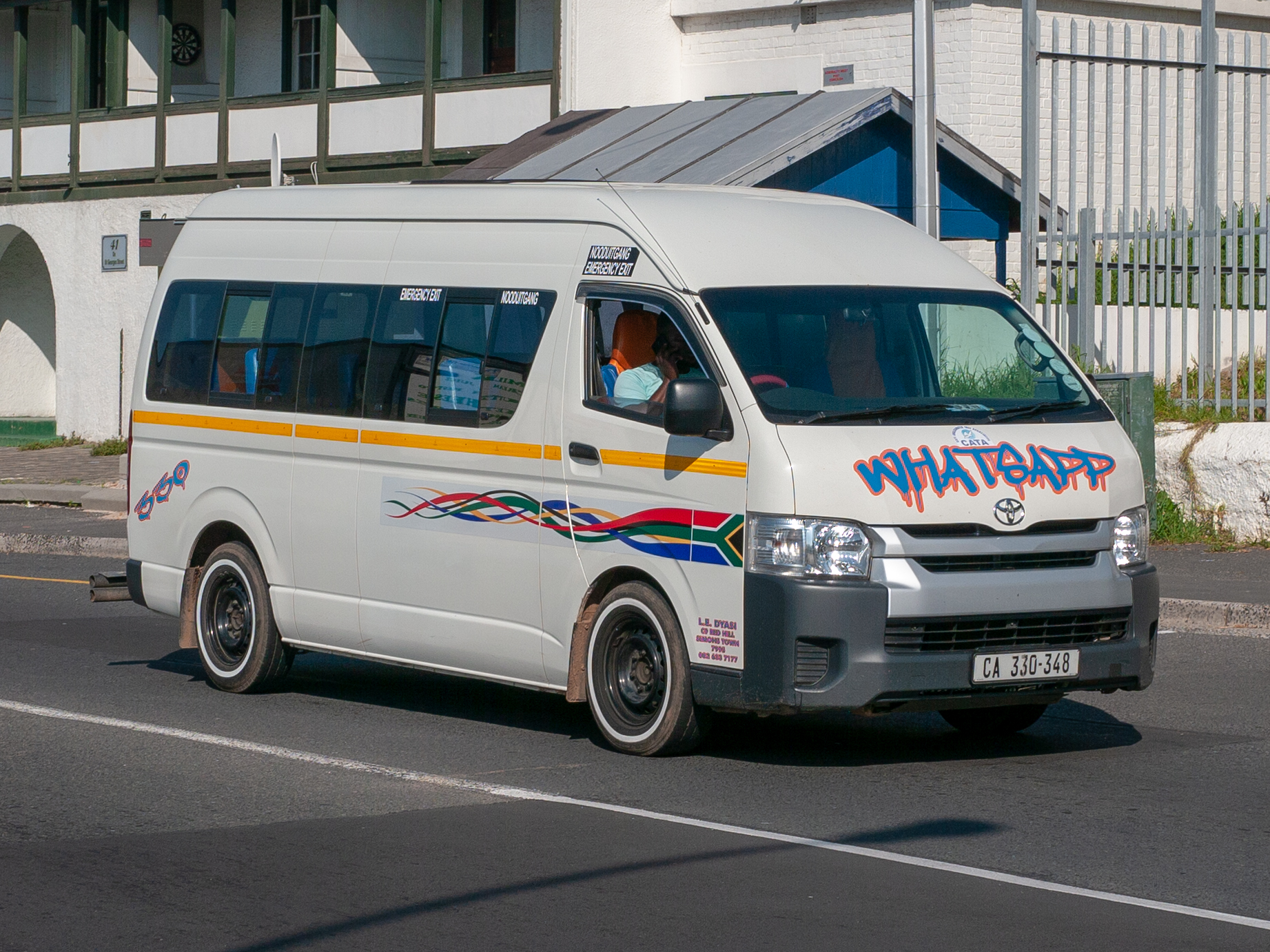
Toyota HiAce (H200 model), which is used for South African minibus taxis

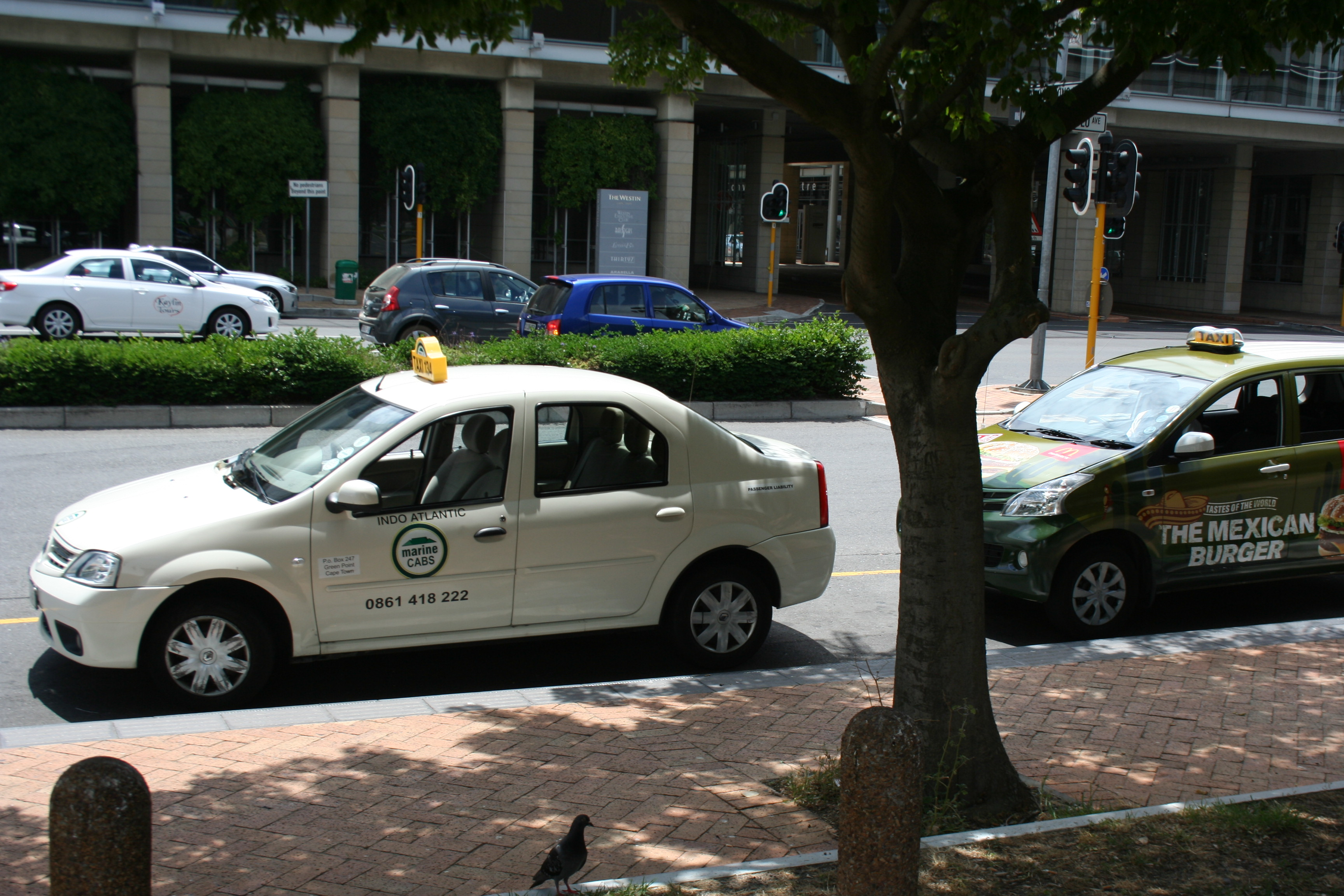
South African meter taxis in Cape Town CBD

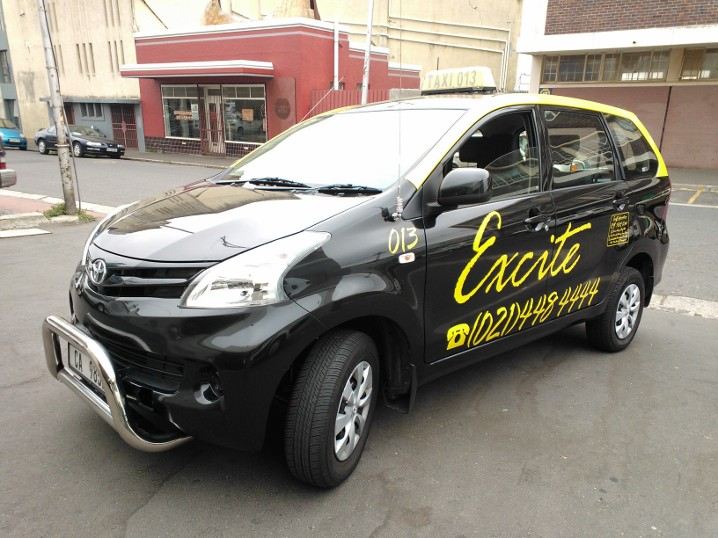
The Toyota Avanza is a popular model for meter cabs in South Africa

== Asia ==
=== Israel ===
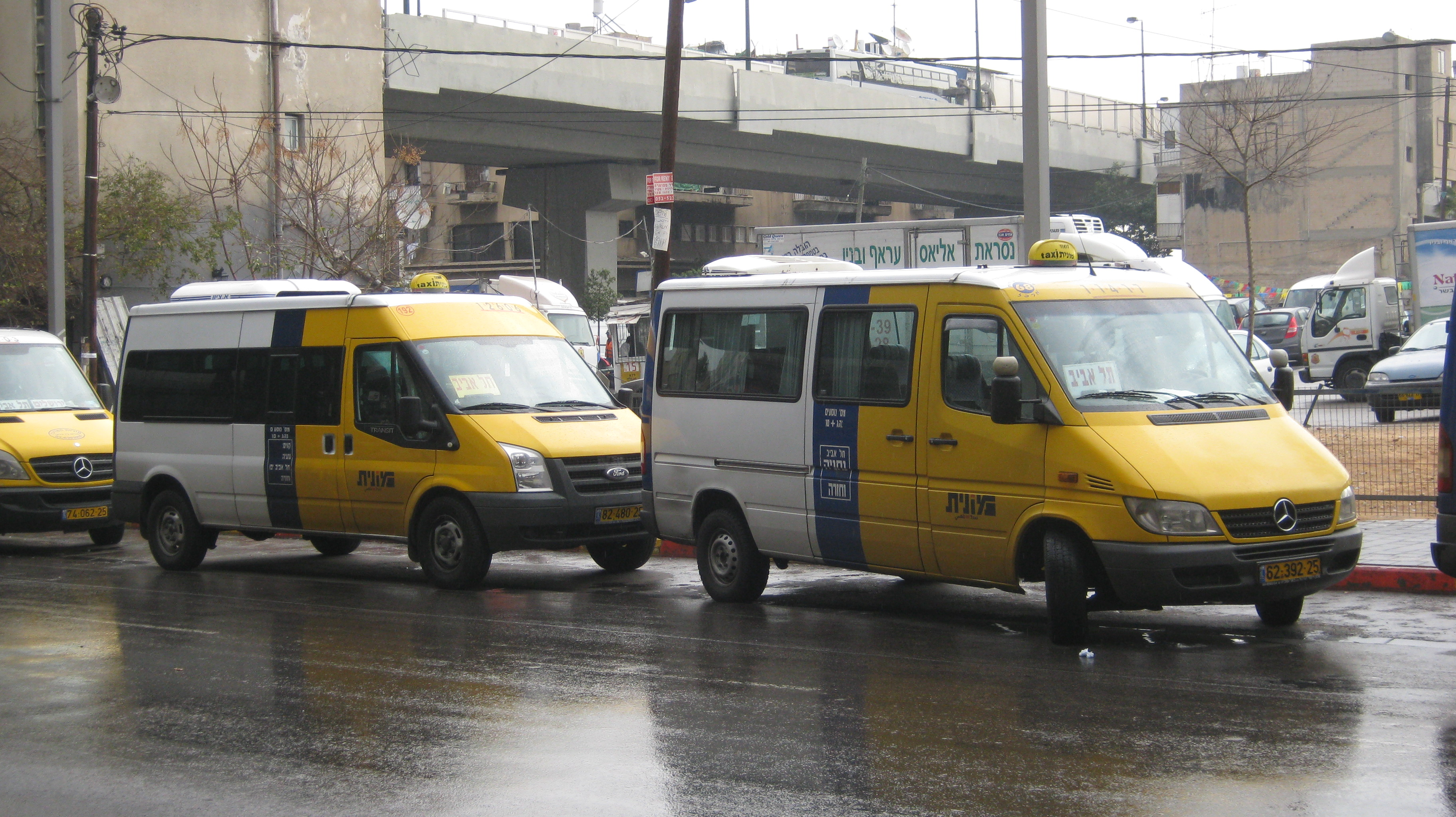
Sherut taxis

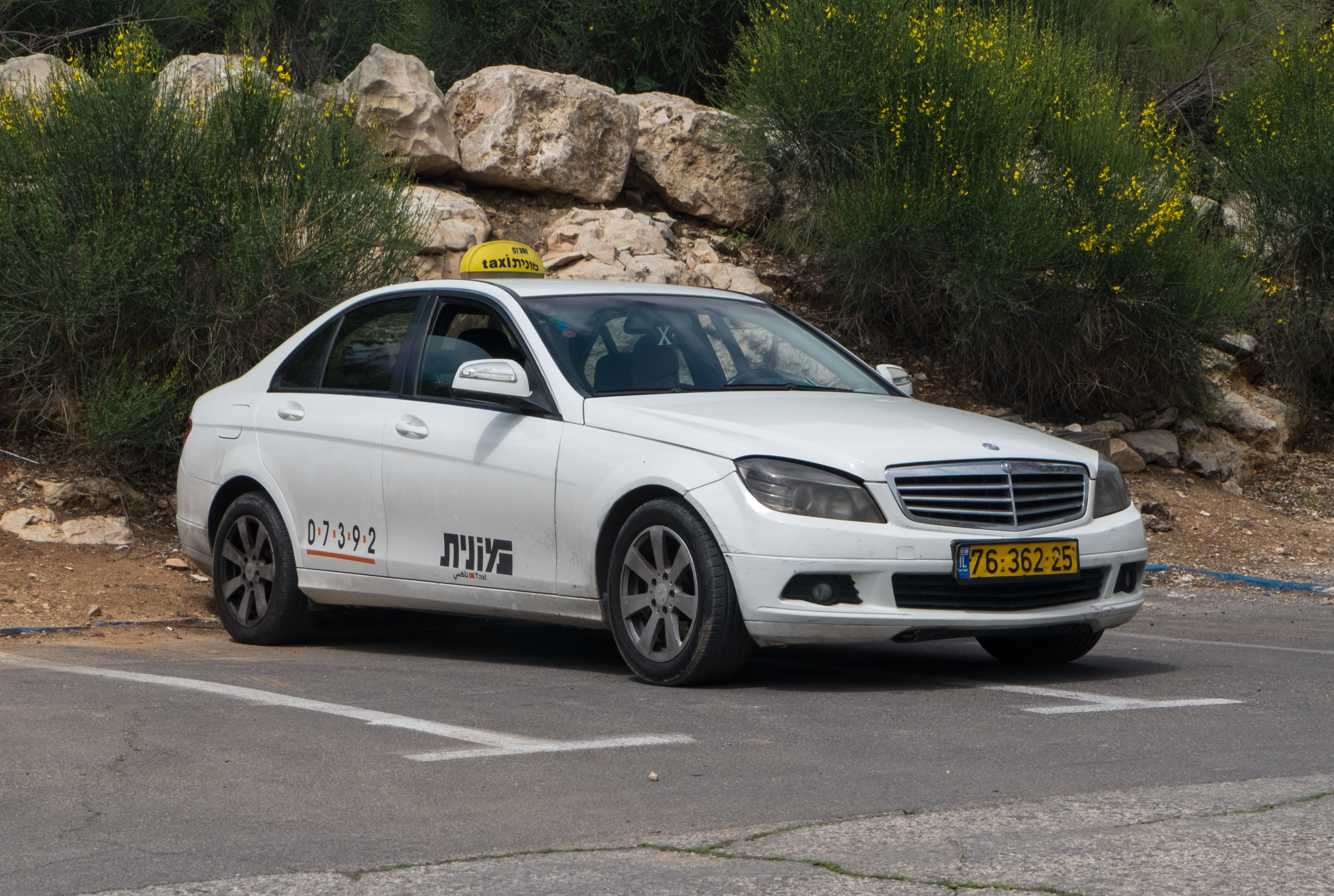
Mercedes-Benz taxi in Jerusalem

There are two taxi systems in Israel, with one operating as a standard taxi service and the other (taxi - sherut) as a cross between a taxi and a private bus system. The latter tends to run longer journeys or particular routes and is effectively a shared taxi – hence set pick-up and set-down locations, but also potentially picking up or dropping off anywhere en route.

Although fares are officially meter-based, it is quite common to agree on the fare in advance with the driver. They have a directory guide for prices and will show the estimated alternative to the meter price, either to be accepted, negotiated or rejected by the traveler if the meter is preferred.

The wisdom of the choice may be based on time of day and traffic and whether the passenger has bags, etc. which could cost more on the meter as each piece adds a set amount. Either way, the eventual fare is not usually significantly different so many Israelis choose the meter without a thought. Tipping is not required but rounding up is common.

Standard taxis are always painted white with decals on the sides that say "Taxi" in Hebrew, English, and Arabic, as well as a 5-digit identification number. Sherut taxis have actual liveries, with them often consisting of a yellow front, blue sides, and a white rear-end.

Both systems have a yellow sign on top of the car which says "Taxi" in Hebrew and English and the identification number, which illuminates as the driver turns on his vehicle's headlights. Taxis registered before 2013 have their plate number suffixed with 25, and taxis registered after 2013 have their plate number suffixed with 26.

==== Palestine (Gaza Strip and the West Bank) ====
Taxis in Palestine have either black and white stripes or are yellow colored depending on the location.

Private taxi companies in the Gaza strip often use Škoda Octavia wagons as their main vehicles while individuals in south of Gaza use 80s 6 door Mercedes limousines as taxis, the Hyundai Verna is also used as taxis.

=== Oman ===
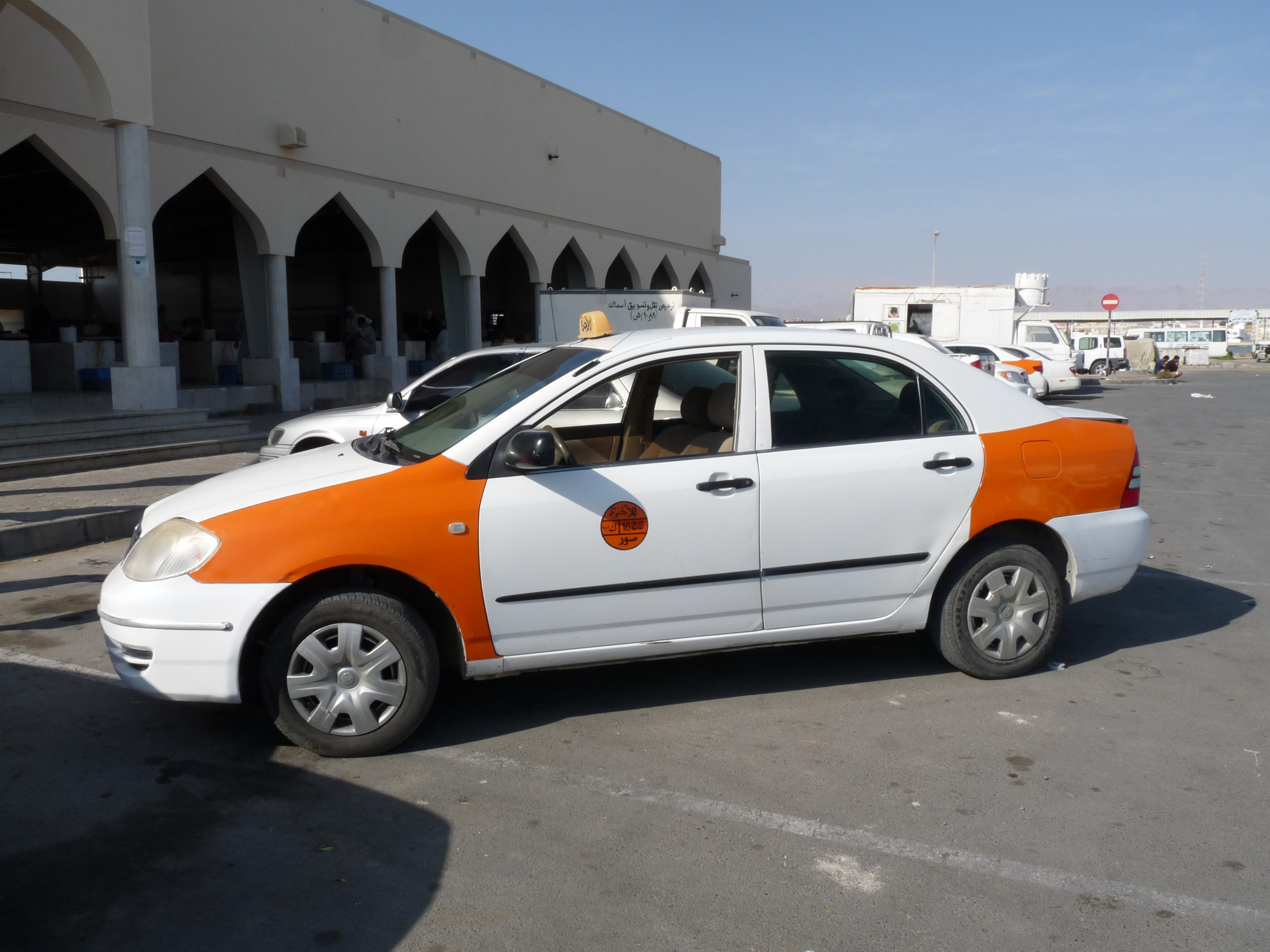
Toyota Corolla taxicab in Oman

Taxicabs in Oman are usually with orange panels and mostly Toyota or Nissan models. The number plate is red and starts with K, KA, KB (for saloons) and KK (for vans). They do not have any meters installed. The fare is generally decided by bargaining with the driver, though most commuters have a good idea of what can be considered a reasonable price.

The rider may choose to have the taxi "shared", or "engaged." In an engaged taxi, the driver will not take any more passengers (as opposed to a shared taxi). Usually, drivers charge much more to have the taxi engaged, sometimes as much as eight to ten times the price of a shared taxi. In a shared taxi, the driver will usually get more people who need to go along the same way. Due to low costs of fuel and fairly high purchasing power parity in Oman, taxicabs are extremely cheap when compared to other parts of the world, even in the engaged mode.

A variation of the shared taxi also exists. These are usually 12-seater Toyota vans. These taxis follow a fixed route, stopping mostly at bus stops to pick up and drop off passengers. Passengers usually get into the taxi that is headed towards their destination. To attract more passengers, taxis stick to highways and main roads. If one wishes to go towards a place, not along the main road, it is generally more economical to use a shared van to commute between two bus stops and then switch over to another taxi headed for the destination, as opposed to taking the regular taxi to commute between the two places.

=== Bangladesh ===
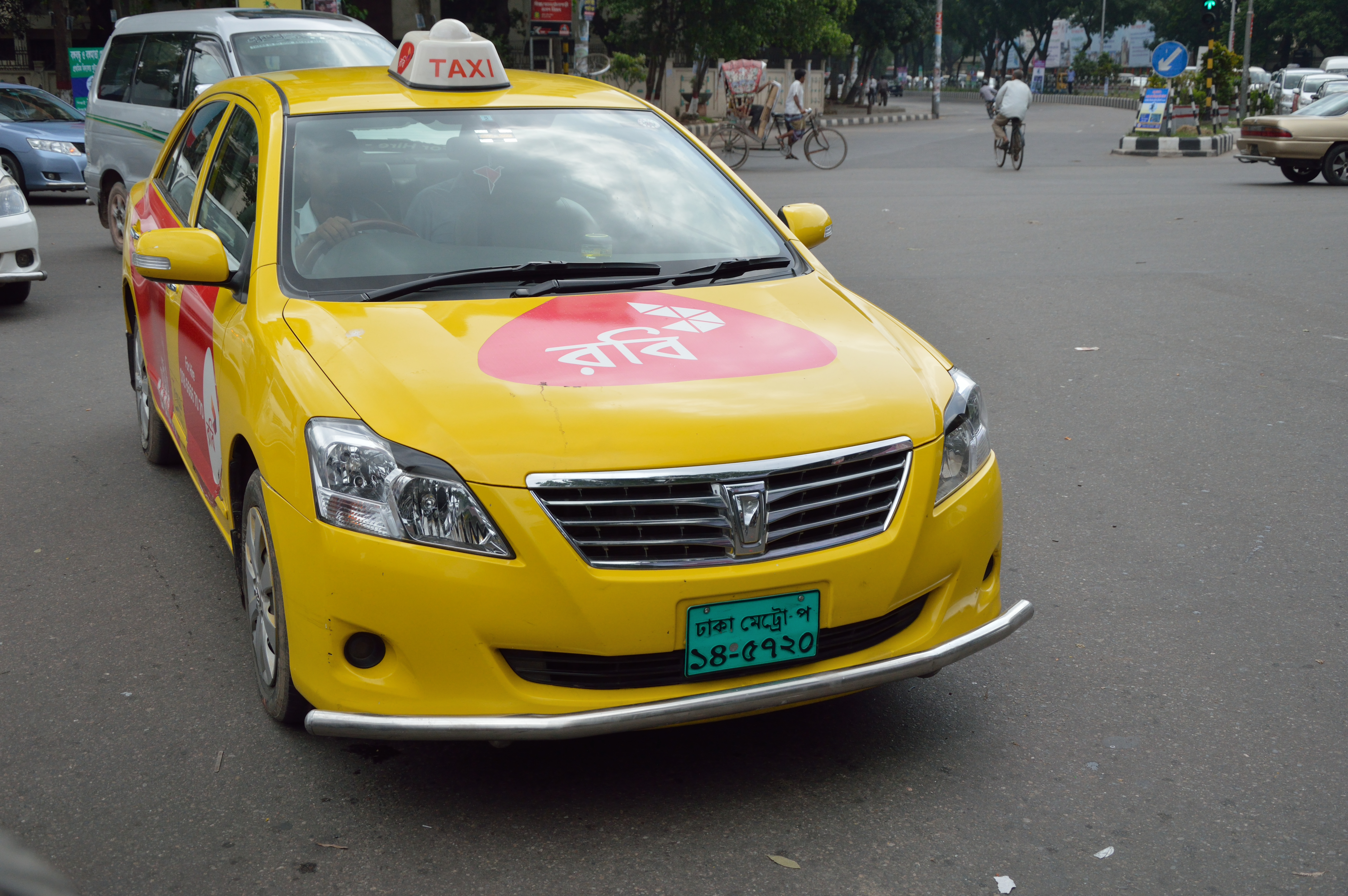
Toyota Premio taxi in Dhaka, Bangladesh

Taxis in Bangladesh are generally Toyota Corolla (E160)s, Toyota Premios or Toyota Allions in yellow. Taxi fares generally start from 80 taka per kilometer. Almost all taxis now run on LPG as well as diesel.

=== China ===
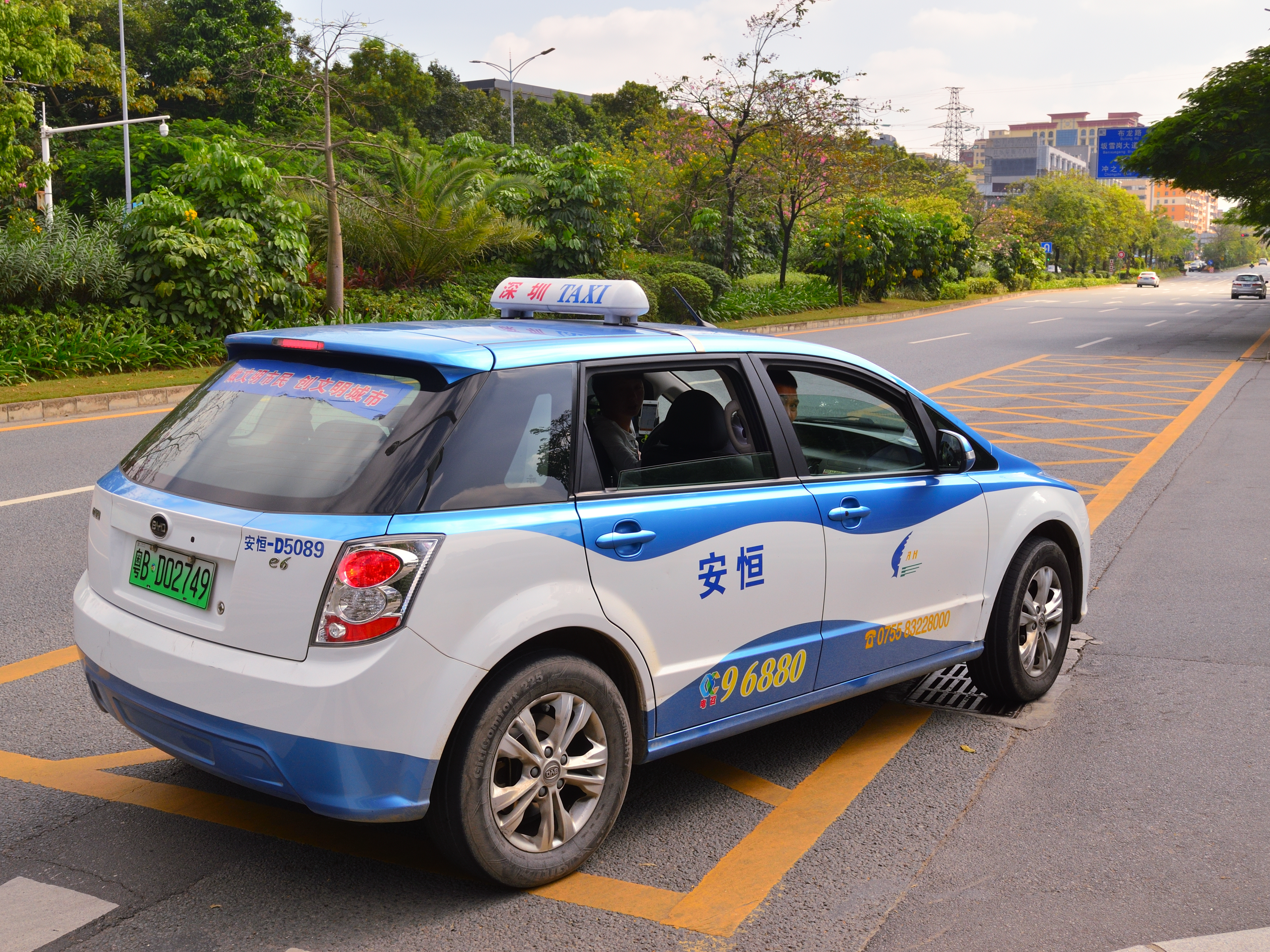
BYD e6 taxi in China

Taxicabs are very common throughout China. Different vehicles are used throughout China due to various provinces and cities' taxi company choices. Formerly, commonly used taxi cars were the Volkswagen Santana, Citroën Fukang and Citroën Elysée. Following Shenzhen, many cities in China started using fleets of EV taxis, using vehicles such as the BYD e6.

Regulation require taxicab drivers working for ride hailing apps to have three years of experience, have a licence from a local taxi regulator and have no criminal record. Their vehicles cannot have over 600,000 kilometers on the odometer and are required to have GPS tracking.

Didi Chuxing is the largest ride hailing app in China; it mainly services larger cities. Even in very small villages, there will be cars for hire. In smaller towns and villages, taxicabs are generally unregulated and may consist of a bike with a carriage, or more commonly, motorcycles with extensions that allow three people to sit in the rear. Even in large cities, taxicabs are generally very lax forms of transportation. Taxicabs in Shanghai may not refuse to go to any destination within the city. Relative to the west, taxicabs are very cheap, and in smaller areas, the fare may be 1 yuan per person.

==== Macau ====
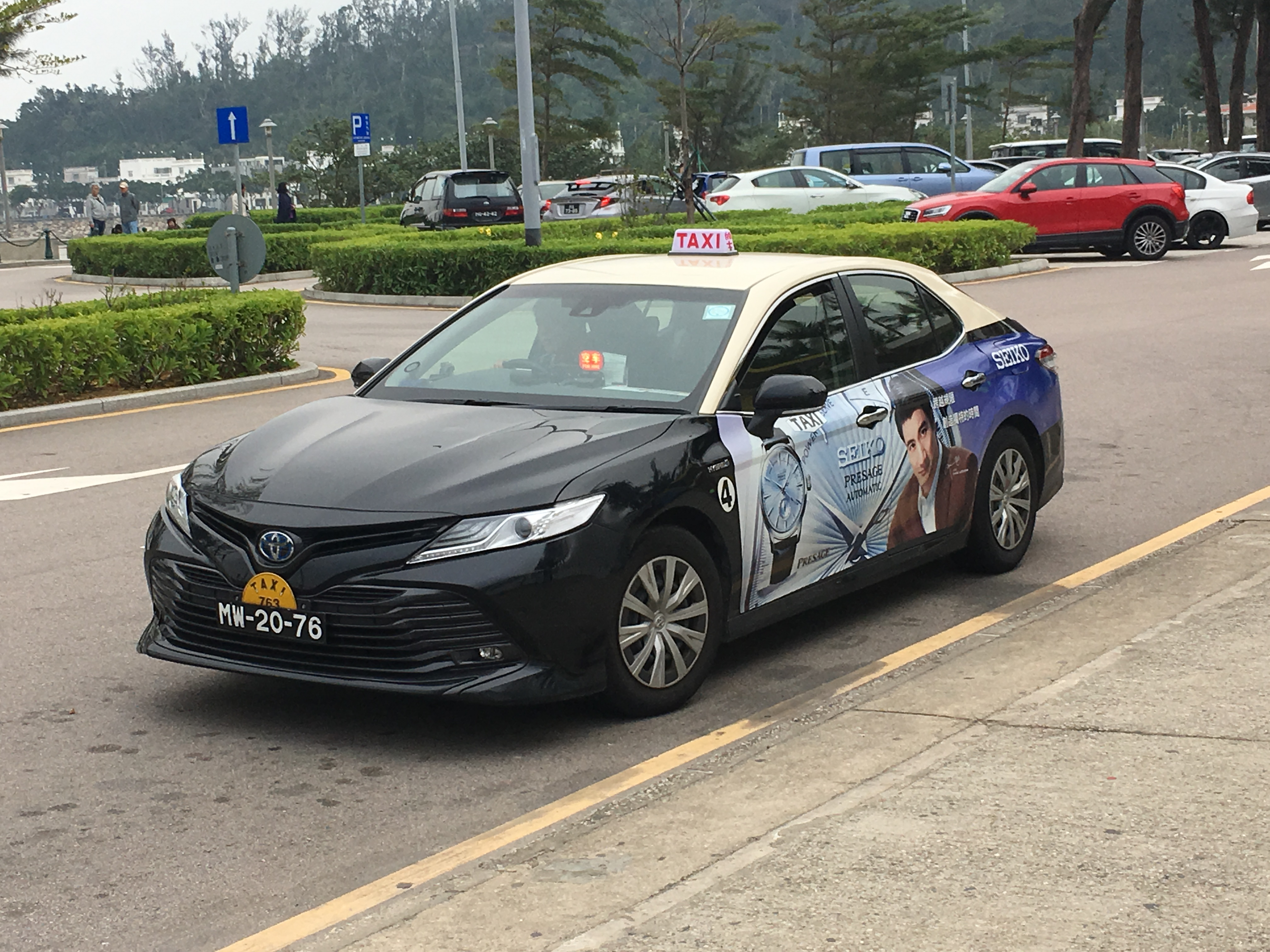
Black Cab Macau Taxi.

There are two types of taxicabs in Macau, easily recognizable by their color patterns. They are:

- Black Cab, probably the oldest in Macau and judged by some to be the most comfortable.
- Macau Radio Taxi Service, founded in 2015, focuses on immediate and advanced Taxi reservation through call center, mobile application and official website.

==== Hong Kong ====
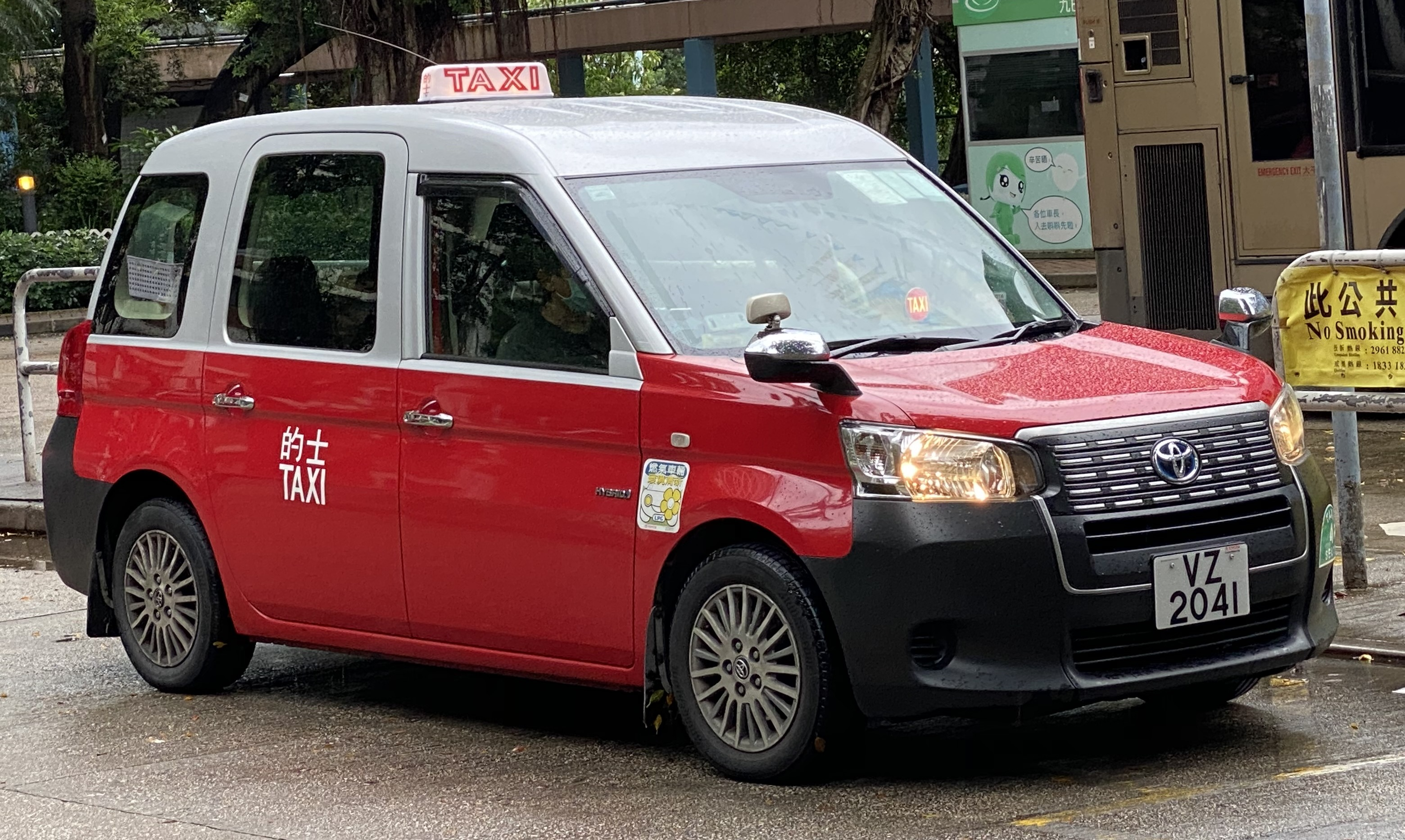
Toyota JPN taxi, Urban taxi

During the early colonial times, sedan chairs were the only form of public conveyances. Public chairs were licensed, and charged according to tariffs which would be prominently displayed. Chair stands were found at all hotels, wharves, and major crossroads. Their numbers peaked in about 1920.

The pulled rickshaw, first imported from Japan in 1870, was a popular form of transport for many years, peaking at more than 7,000 in the early part of the 20th century. The rickshaw and sedan chair vied for customers depending on their budget, haste, or terrain to be negotiated. The rickshaw was more rapid, but was not suited to climbing the steep terrain of Hong Kong Island.

Rickshaws' popularity waned after World War II. There were about eight in 1998, and only four left in 2002. The last sedan chair was reportedly abandoned in 1965; and the rickshaws have disappeared since the ferry's closure at the end of 2006.

The earliest modern taxi service was first officially recorded by the government in 1947 with 329 cars.

In Hong Kong today, there are three types of taxis, painted in different colors, serving different parts of the territory. The most common one, which is painted in red. The red taxi serves throughout Hong Kong Island and Kowloon. Green taxis serve the New Territories and light blue taxis serve Lantau Island. Taxis pick up passengers from streets, or by radio-dispatch by phone. Fares are charged according to the distance measured by meters. Surcharges include tolls, luggage, and pets.

=== Indonesia ===
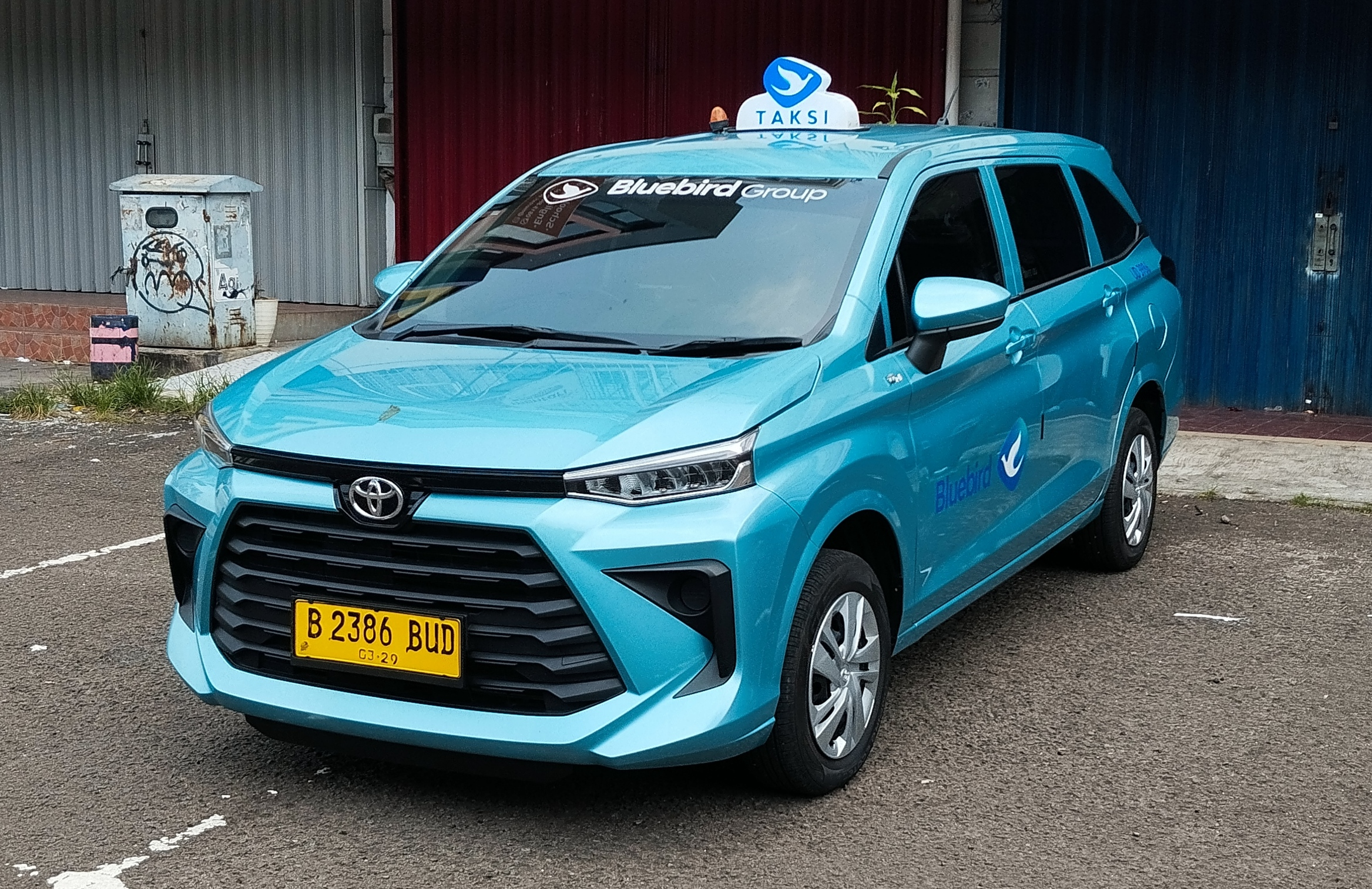
A Toyota Transmover (W100) taxi, a fleet variant of the Avanza, operated by Bluebird Group. Regular taxicabs based on MPVs such as the Transmover were becoming popular in Jakarta in the 2020s

In most parts of Indonesia, taxicabs (taksi) were often seen in various colors and roof signs, operated by various different companies. Currently, Bluebird Group is the largest taxicab company in the country, having dominant in the entire taxicab industry through recent years, not only in Jakarta, but also in other major cities such as Bandung and Surabaya, as well the Bali island.

Taxicabs began to be popular in Jakarta from the early 1970s. Compared to other colors, yellow-colored taxis were initially a common sight at that time, among of them were operated by President Taxi. In February 1972, taximeters were started implemented to the taxis. Four months after, Bluebird (originally spelled as Blue Bird at the time) was founded after obtaining a permit from Jakarta Office of Transportation, and started operating a fleet of light blue taxis, which were later become very common alongside the yellow-colored taxis in Jakarta through later years.

The popularity of yellow-colored taxis were remained until the beginning of the 1990s when President Taxi restructured their business over their bad reputation for poor service and reliability, and was renamed to Prestasi during the 1990s or in early 2000s, with their fleet were repainted to blue similar to Bluebird's. Yellow-colored taxis would briefly absent in Jakarta until the introduction of Taxiku in October 2002, operated by Hiba Group.

Bluebird's popularity of blue-colored taxis have led a few operators began to copy the same color the former have used, including sometimes, the shape of the roof sign. This have sometimes resulted in several misleadings by consumers when hailing blue-colored taxis on the street.

Until the late 2010s, commonly used taxi cars were mostly compact cars; between early 1970s and late 1980s, initial models include the Holden Torana (LJ), Toyota Corolla (E20) and Corona, and various types of Datsuns such as the 220C. In the 1980s, they were gradually replaced by the Ford Laser (KE), Isuzu/Holden Gemini, Nissan Sunny (B13) and Stanza (T11).

In the late 1990s, operators started using the Bimantara Cakra (X3) (later renamed to the Hyundai Excel in the early 2000s), Timor S5 series, and to most extent, the Toyota Soluna. Between the early 2000s to late 2010s, models include the Toyota Limo and Etios, Chevrolet Lova (T250), Geely MK, Hyundai Excel II/III, Kia Rio/Pride and Cerato (TD), Nissan Sunny Neo (N16), Latio (C11) and Almera (N17), and various models from Proton.

Since late 2010s, regular car-based taxis in Jakarta were begun to be replaced by MPV-based ones, with common cars such as the Toyota Transmover and Honda Mobilio, and lesser extent cars such as the Nissan Grand Livina and Wuling Confero. Regular MPV-based taxis were previously common in Sumatra, Borneo, Central and East Java regions. Daihatsu Sigras and Toyota Calyas were also seen as taxicabs.

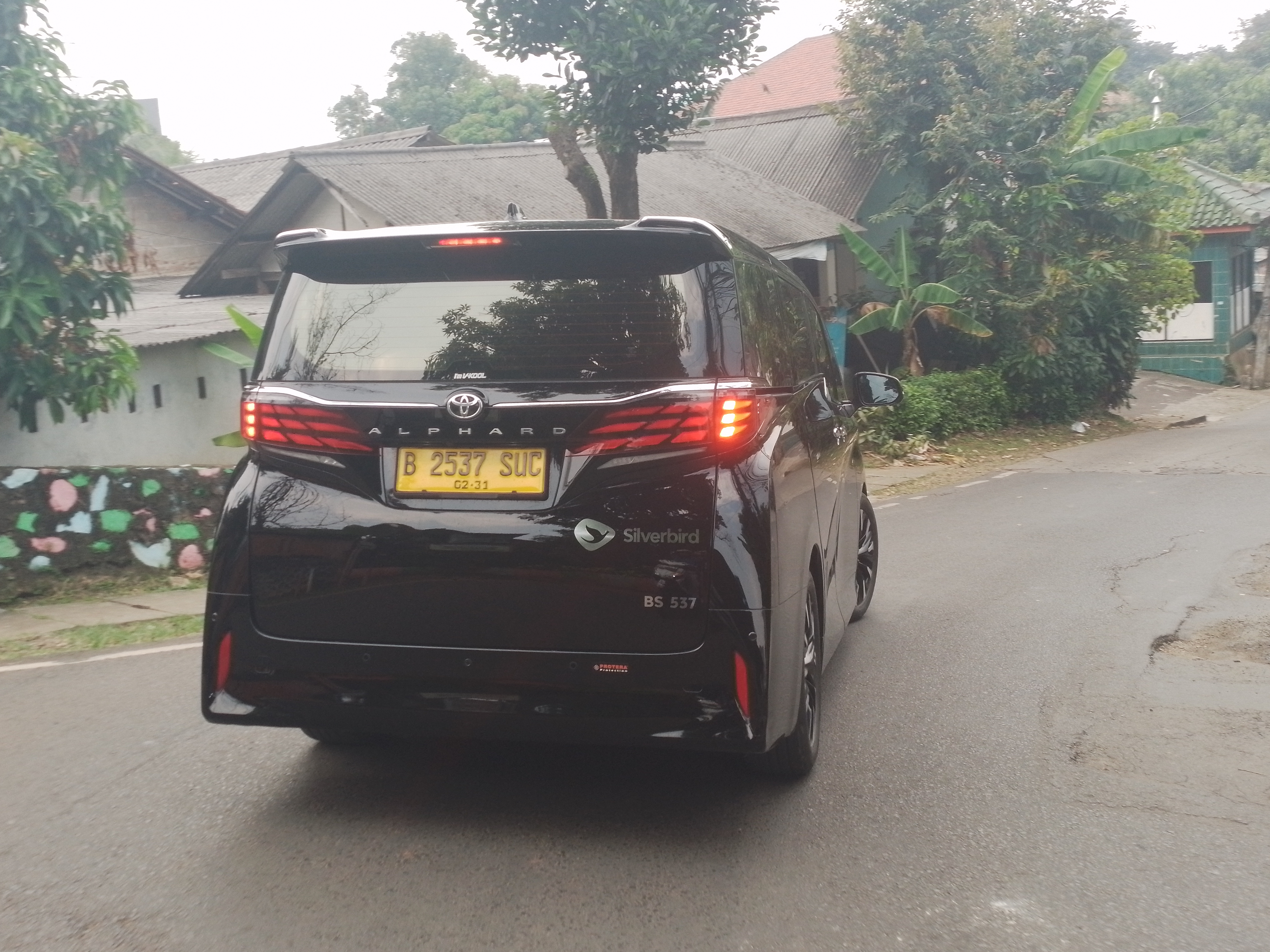
A Toyota Alphard (AH40) executive taxi operated by Silverbird

Since 1993, executive taxicabs were begun to operate as premium alternatives to its regular counterparts. Most executive taxis were painted in black and often seen as either sedans such as the BMW 3 Series (F30), Hyundai Sonata (NF and YF), Mercedes-Benz C-Class (W203 and W204), E-Class (W211 and W212) and S-Class (W221), and Toyota Camry (XV40 and XV50), or minivans such as the Mercedes-Benz Viano (W639), Nissan Elgrand (E52) and Toyota Alphard.

Among the first executive taxis were the diesel-powered Nissan Cedric (Y31), and to a lesser extent, the Toyota Crown Comfort (LXS12). The first Cedric taxis were originally converted from those previously used as transport vehicles of the participating member state leaders for the 10th Summit of the Non-Aligned Movement, held from 1 to 6 September 1992 in Jakarta.

Electric taxicabs began to appear in the country in mid-2019, with the first cars being the BYD e6 (regular) and Tesla Model X (executive). Other cars include the BYD T3, Hyundai Kona Electric (SX2), and VinFast VF e34. Hybrid taxicabs were introduced in 2026, with Bluebird chose the Toyota Kijang Innova Zenix Hybrid as their regular-premium taxicab under the name Bluebird Prime. Five years earlier in late 2021, plug-in hybrid taxicabs were introduced, with the addition of the Toyota Prius PHEV (XW50).

Following the Honda Mobilio's discontinuation in June 2024, the BR-V crossover was selected by Bluebird in May 2025 as a newer regular taxicab replacing the Mobilio.

=== Japan ===
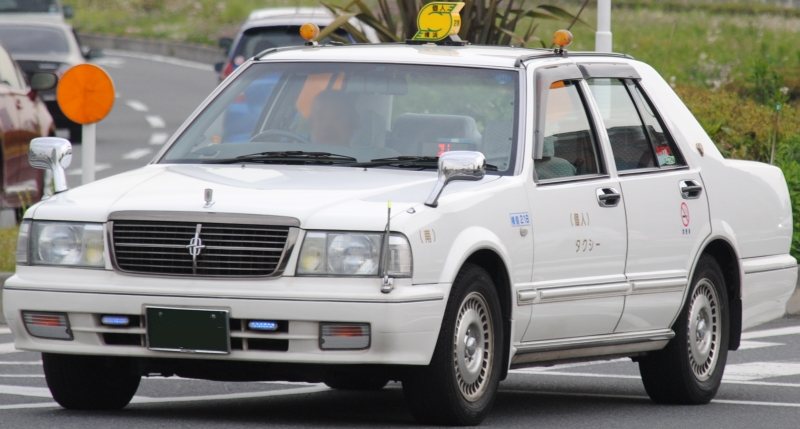
Nissan Cedric (Y31) taxi in Yokohama

In most parts of Japan, there are many taxicabs of various colors and styles. Japan has no limitation on taxicab design, so each taxicab company adopts its own design, although owner-driver taxicabs use a prescribed design. In Osaka, most taxicabs are black because they are also used as limousine taxis. The privately owned taxis are white with blue stripes.

The most common cars used for taxi in Japan are Toyota Crown and Nissan Cedric. During the 1980s and 1990s, the Nissan Bluebird, Nissan Laurel and Toyota Mark II were also used. Since the late 1990s, the most popular taxis are the base Toyota Comfort and the more-equipped Crown Comfort. In the recent years, taxi operators began to run environmental-friendly cars like Toyota Prius and Nissan Leaf.

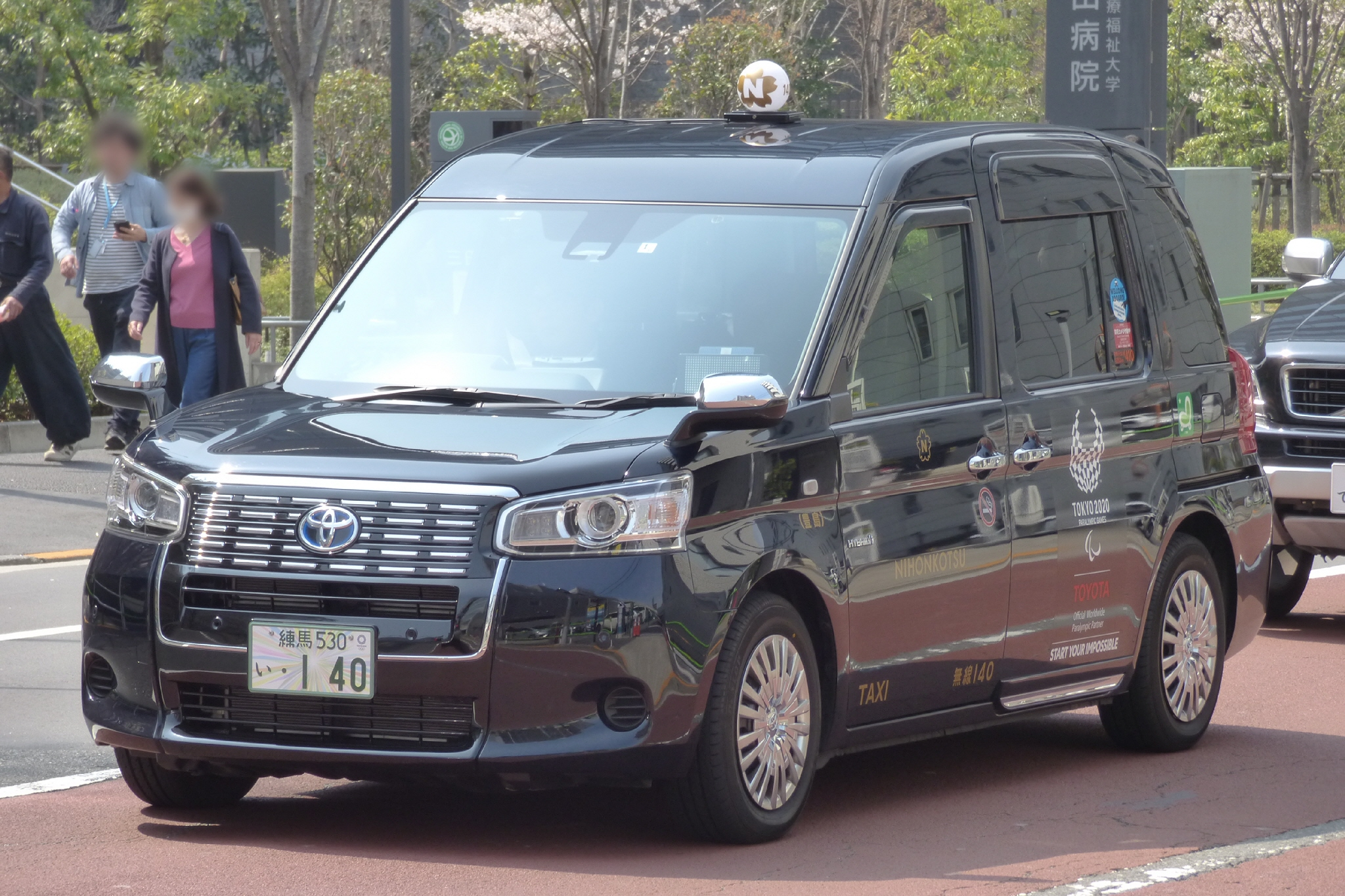
A Nihon Kotsu Toyota JPN Taxi in Tokyo.

In the run up to the 2020 Summer Olympics, Toyota introduced their new Toyota JPN Taxi model to replace the ubiquitous Toyota Comfort. A hybrid vehicle, the JPN Taxi was developed to be environmentally conscious and more user friendly to otherwise abled individuals with a low, flat, wheelchair accessible floor, creating a vehicle that embodies the spirit of Japanese hospitality and serves as a symbol for the country much like the London Taxi.

=== Malaysia ===
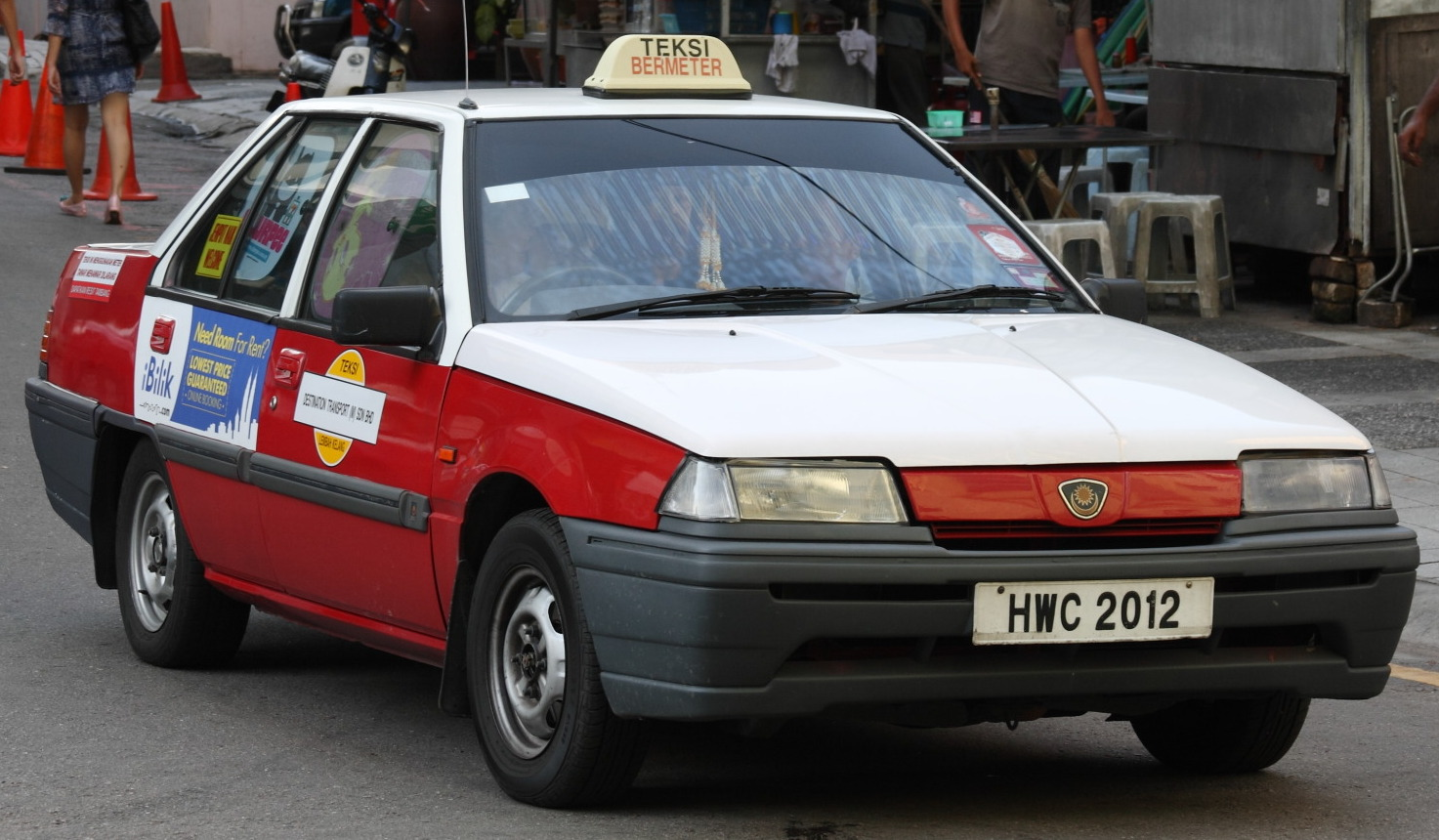
Since the 1990s, the saloon variant of the Proton Saga Iswara dominated as the preferable car model for taxicabs in Malaysia.

In Malaysia, taxicabs are also referred to as teksi. There are several taxi operators running within Malaysia. Most taxicabs use their preferred car of choice, the Proton Saga Iswara saloon since the 1990s, and a distinct fleet of cabs are the newer generation of Proton Saga since the 2010s.

Before the start of local car production, the Mercedes-Benz 200, Mazda 323/Ford Laser, Toyota Mark II X80 series and the Opel Kadett were used. Most were scrapped and replaced by Protons, but there are still a large number running the roads. Those old models have a "Kereta Sewa" sign on top and use old taxi registration plates.

Although most taxicabs run on diesel, a handful of taxicabs run on CNG.

There are a number of small taxicab companies and some private individual ones. Cabs are generally in red and white. Larger and reliable taxi companies are required to display they owned colors i.e. Sunlight Radio Cab, Innovasi Timur Orange Taxi Cab and Public Cab.

=== Philippines ===
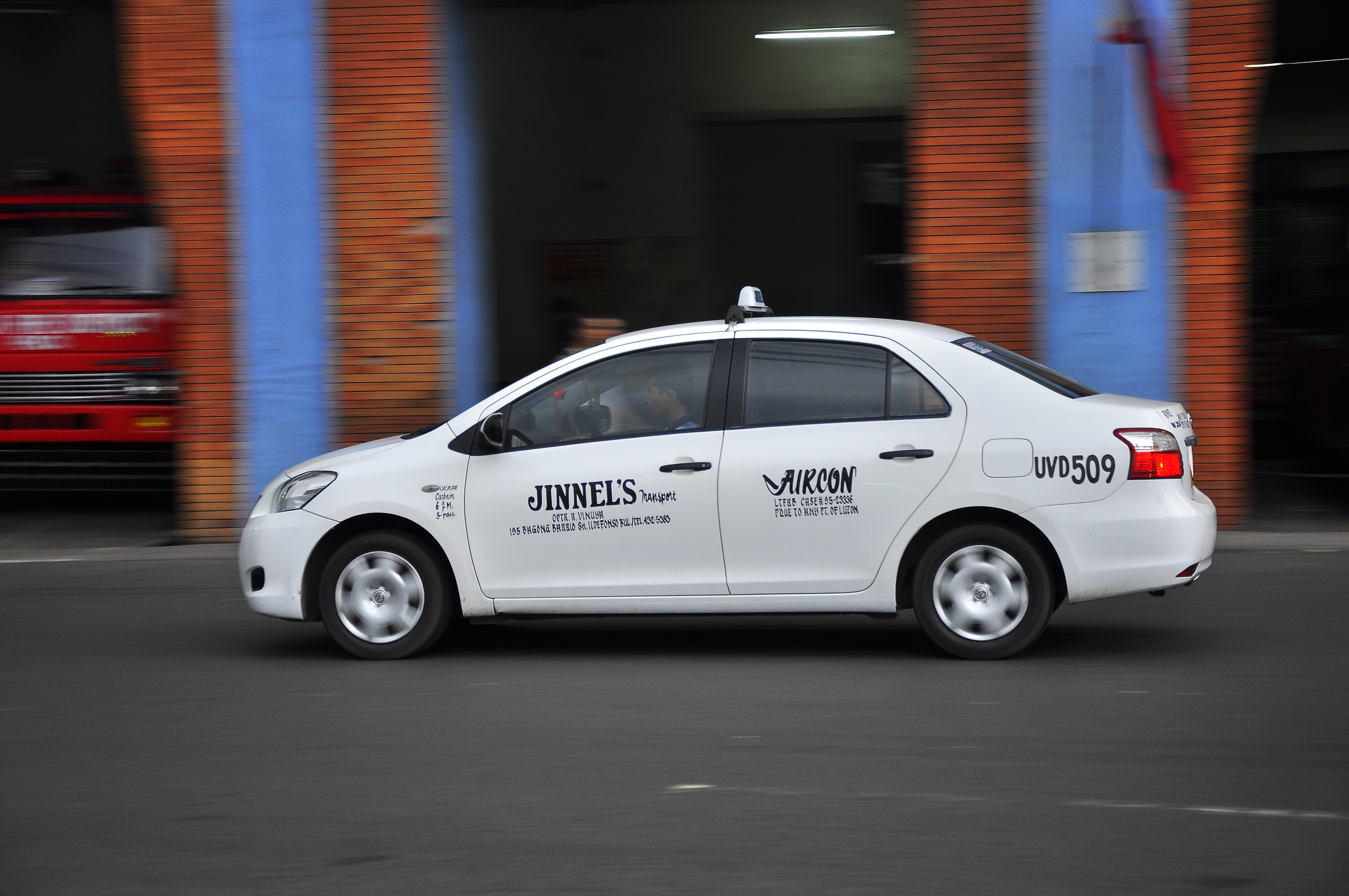
A Toyota Vios white taxicab roaming in Metro Manila.

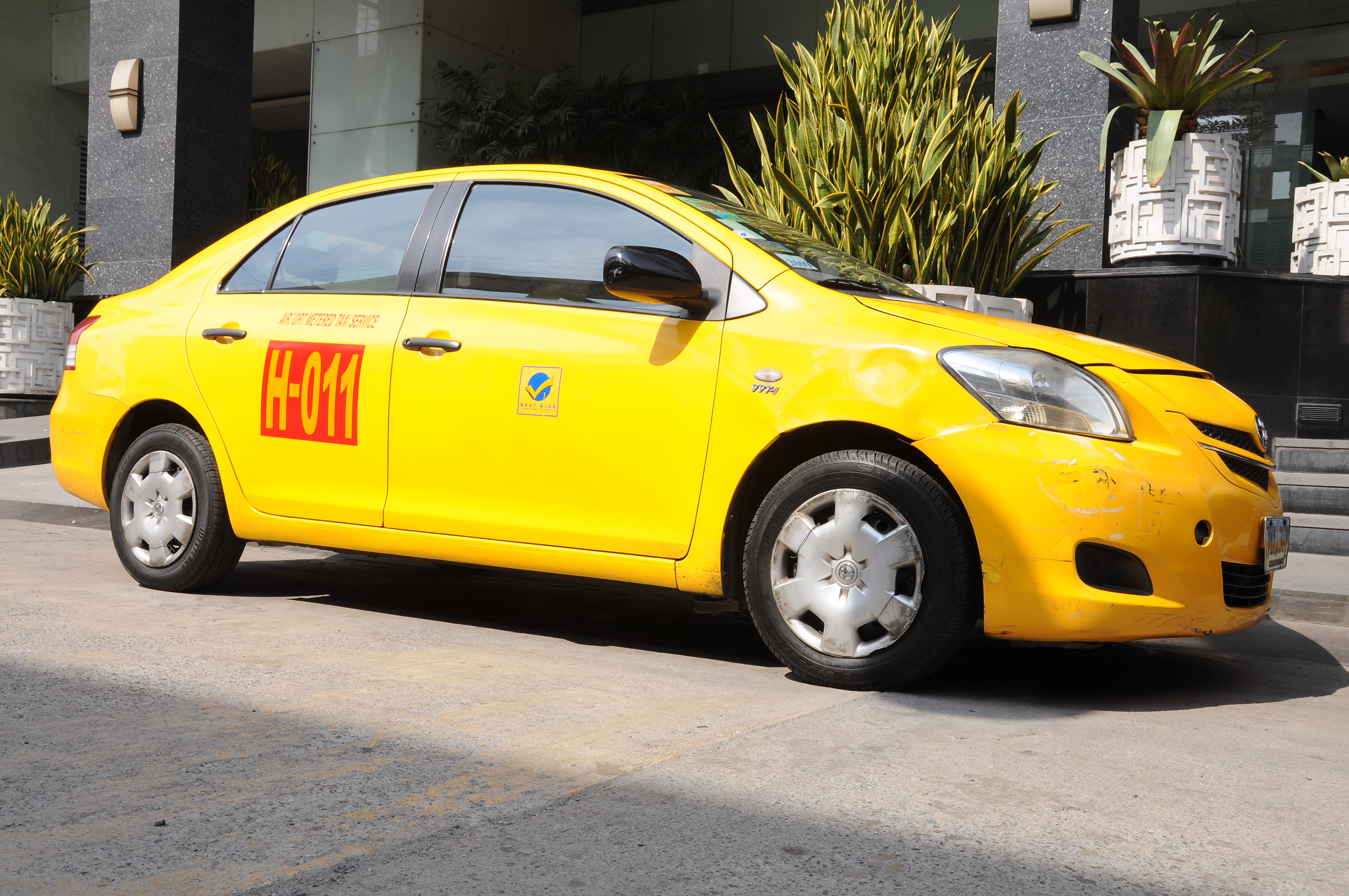
A yellow Toyota Vios airport taxicab

Taxicabs of the Philippines are one of the modes of transportation in the country. They are regulated by the Department of Transportation (DOTr), the Land Transportation Office (LTO), and the Land Transportation Franchising and Regulatory Board (LTFRB). The taxicabs there vary from models and uses. Most taxicabs have yellow colored license plates, taxi signs, LTFRB Registration number, and taximeter, which is mandatory in every cab.

Taxicabs in the Philippines are usually white while yellow is commonly used as airport taxis. In metropolitan Manila, some cab companies use different colour configurations to help distinguish their cars from other companies such as blue, grey, and red.

Taxis during the 1990s did not have a color-coding system but in 2001, LTFRB mandated that all taxicabs should be white. Some taxicab companies, however, still use their own colors to distinguish their units while keeping the roof and pillars white. Airport taxis, on the other hand, are yellow. A taxicab has a maximum operational lifespan of 10 years before being pulled out of service.

Each taxicab has its license plate number printed on both quarter panels. The rear of the car has the telephone numbers of the taxicab company and the LTFRB printed to report any reckless driving.

=== Singapore ===
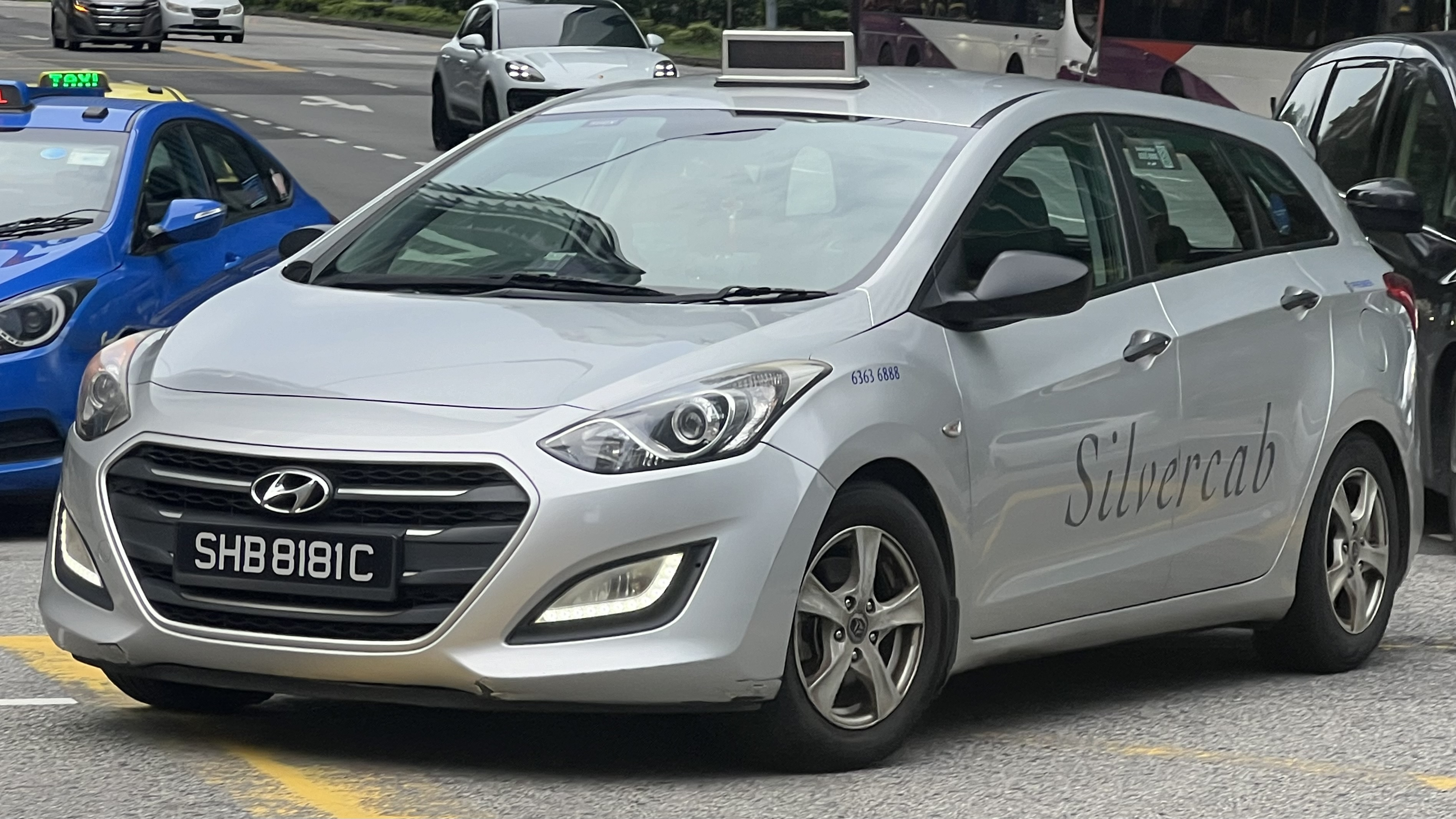
Hyundai i30 Tourer SilverCab taxi in Singapore

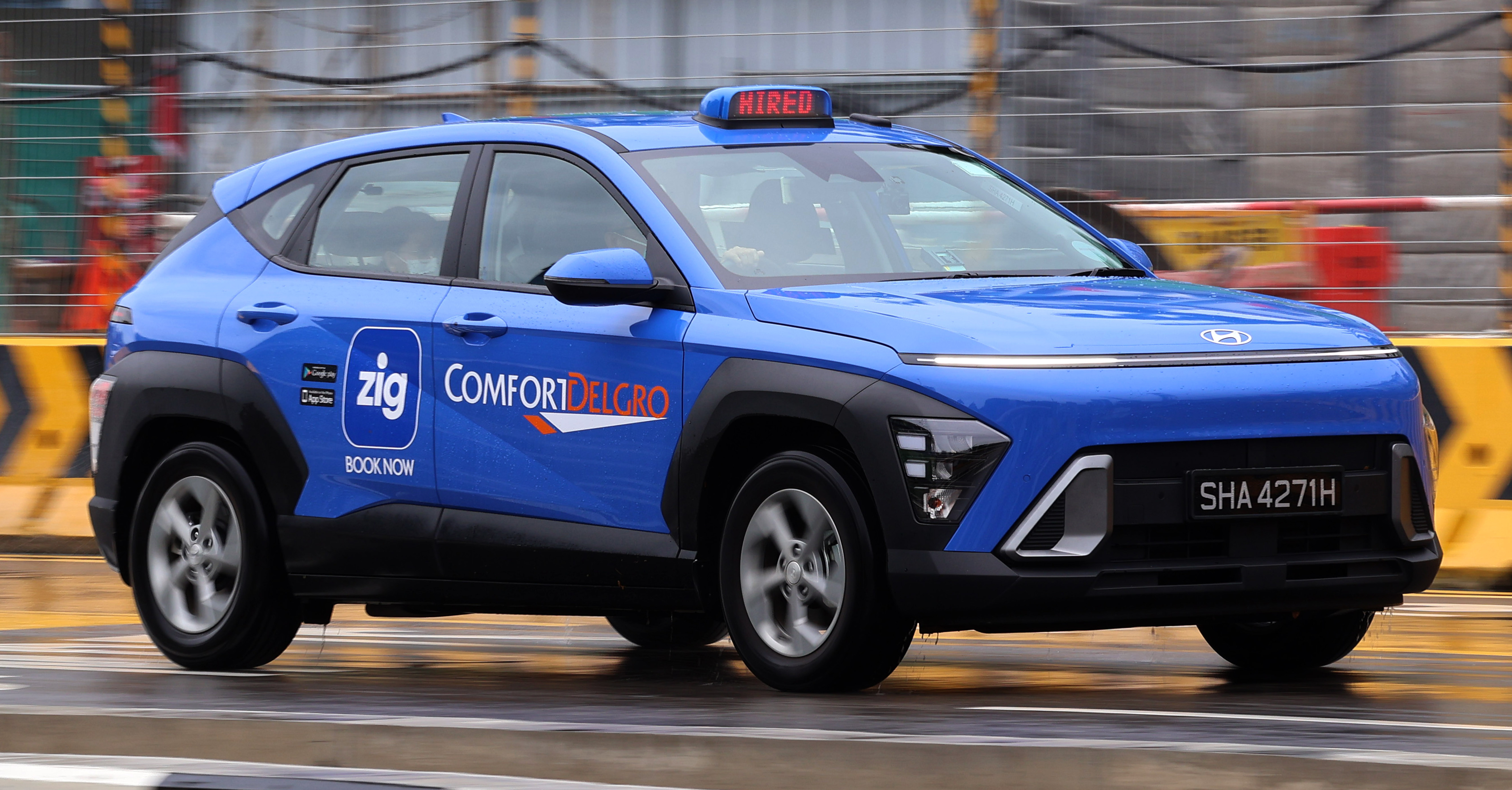
Hyundai Kona Hybrid (SX2) in the current ComfortDelGro livery

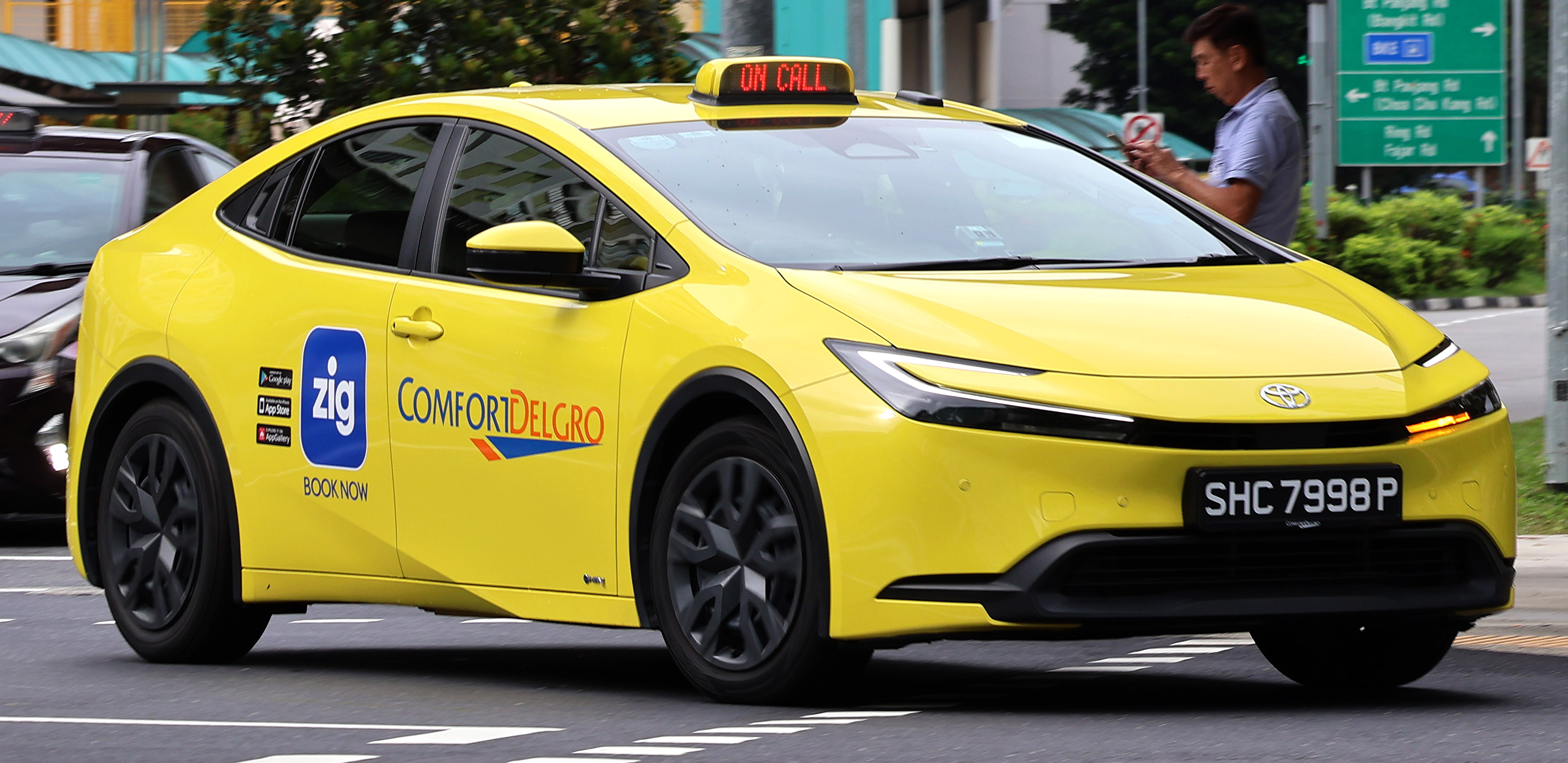
Toyota Prius (XW60) City Cab ComfortDelGro taxi

Total fleet: 82,130 (As of July 2019)

By 1970, with the implementation of a diesel tax and an additional 1,200 licenses for taxis, the government announced plans to phase out pirate taxis. In May that year, the National Trades Union Congress (NTUC) announced plans to provide a cooperative taxi and minibus service, and to get former pirate taxi drivers to drive the minibuses as part of the cooperative.

In July 1970, a taxi stop scheme was trialled on four streets in the central area, in which taxis could only stop at designated taxi stops. Despite concerns over inconvenience and confusion raised by the Taxi Driver's Association, the Registry of Vehicles declared the trial a success and went on to expand the scheme. Pirate and school taxis were eventually phased out by July 1971.

NTUC's taxi cooperative, named 'Comfort', started operations in 1971 with a fleet of 1,000 taxis, with the first taxis entering service at the end of January that year. Early NTUC Comfort fleet used cars like Isuzu Florian and Datsun 220C Diesel.

In June 1981, electronic meters were introduced to the taxis. TIBS Taxis was formed in 1987, and was renamed to SMRT Taxis on 10 May 2004. Popular cars used for taxi during the 1980s and 1990s were the diesel-powered Nissan Cedric, Toyota Crown, and Toyota Corona (T140).

In 1995, CityCab was formed with the merger of SBS Taxi, Singapore Commuter and Singapore Airport Bus Services. In April 1998, CityCab had introduced MaxiCab (a 7-seater cab).

Every taxicab in Singapore is fitted with meters. ComfortDelGro is the only company that has flat fare booking on the app itself, with a system limitation of one destination. Dynamic pricing was introduced in May 2019 through "ComfortRIDE". ComfortDelGro was the only one to use Uber until Uber's operations in Southeast Asia merged into Grab, where all other companies are still using it. ComfortDelGro also plans to tie up with Go-Jek.

=== South Korea ===
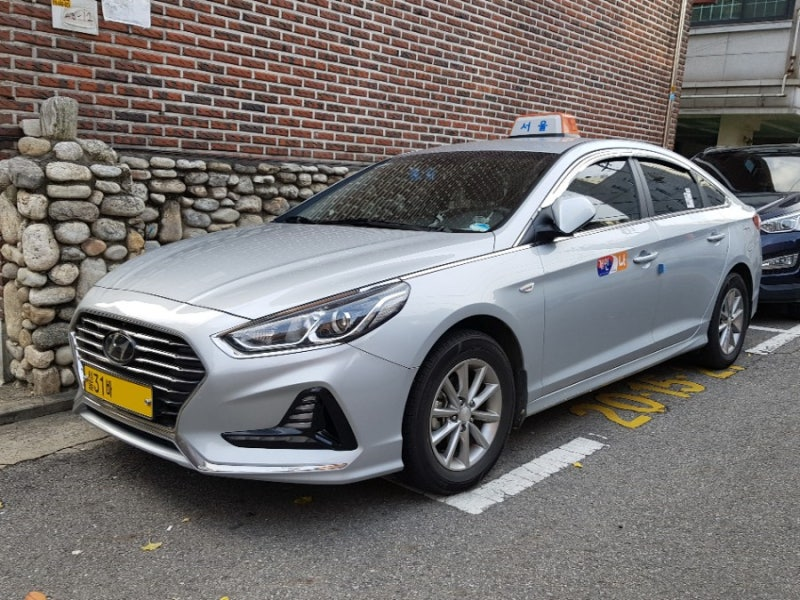
Hyundai Sonata taxicab in South Korea

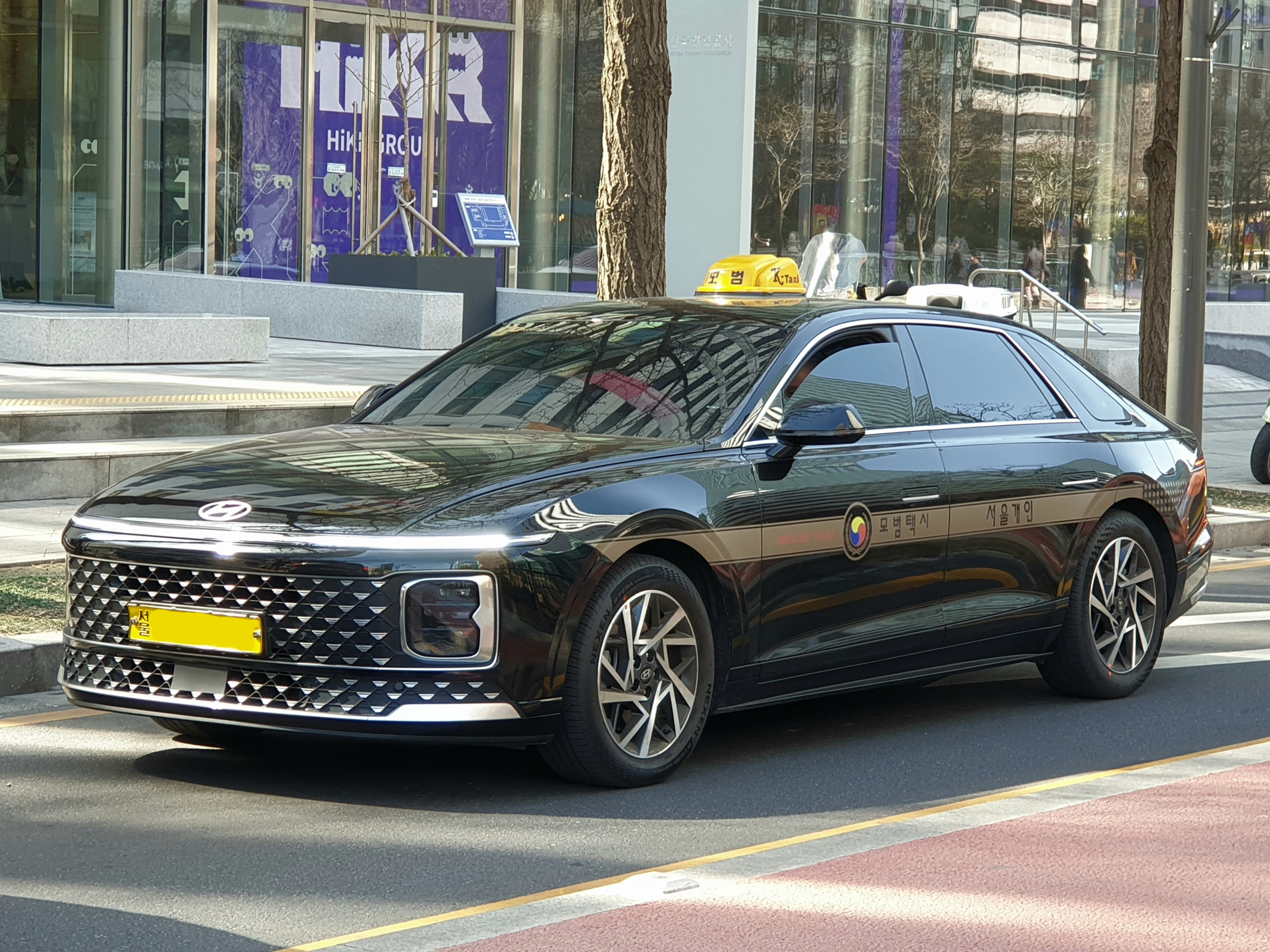
Hyundai Grandeur taxicab in South Korea

There is an extensive taxicab system, with about 70,000 taxis in Seoul alone. Altogether there are about 250,000 taxis in the whole of the country.

In cities such as Seoul and Busan, taxicabs are very common. There are three types: an "ordinary" (ilban; 일반) taxi; a "deluxe" (mobum; 모범) taxicab, which is painted black and is bigger and much more expensive; and a 'taxicab for the handicapped' (jang-e-in call taxi; 장애인콜택시), yellow vans with accessibility enhancements.

There are also two types of taxicab drivers' licenses: all taxicab drivers start driving their taxicab as employees in the taxicab companies, and these taxicabs that belong to a company are called 'corporate' (bubin; 법인) taxicabs. After years of service in the taxicab company, drivers get a license which allows them to purchase their own vehicle and drive it as a self-employed driver, and the taxicabs they then drive are called 'individual' (gaein; 개인) taxicabs.

For 'ordinary' taxicabs, there is an extra 20% increase in fare after midnight, but this does not apply to the 'deluxe' taxis. Most 'ordinary' taxis are silver or white in color. Virtually all South Korean taxicabs are South Korean car models, and meter fares start at 3,800 South Korean won.

The fares are much cheaper than in major cities in Europe and North America, and no extra fares are charged for luggage. All taxicabs are labeled in Korean with a sign 'individual' (개인), 'deluxe' (모범), or the name of the company if the taxicab belongs to a taxicab company, and have a half-sphere on top of a half-pyramid, or to a lesser degree a silhouette of a traditional Korean gate attached on the roof and labeled "TAXI".

=== Taiwan ===
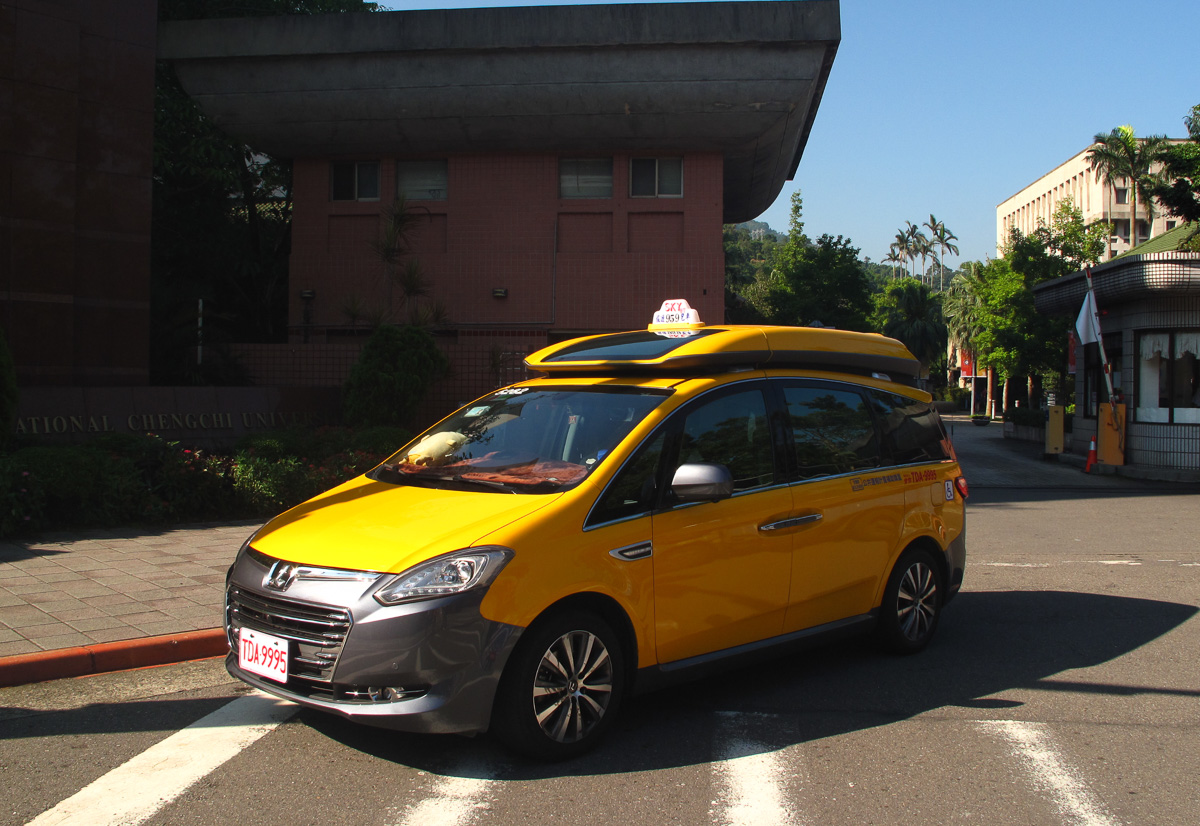
Luxgen V7 taxi in Taiwan

The Road Traffic Security Rules require taxi drivers in Taiwan to be at least 20 years old and have occupational driver licenses. When drivers reach 60 years old, they may continue to drive taxis until 65 years old provided they pass annual physical examinations. Though there is a limit on the number of taxi licenses issued, taxi drivers who have maintained a clean driving record for six consecutive years can apply to drive taxis under personal licenses.

Taxis in larger cities are widely metered with fares generally based on distances and now more commonly with surcharges for times in slow and stopped traffic. At Lunar New Year, the most important Taiwanese holiday, surcharges may also be payable.

Throughout the 1990s in Taipei, violent clashes resulting from traffic disputes broke out between rival taxi companies. After two major murders in late 1996, Yao Kao-chiao, the director-general of the National Police Agency, said that his daughter would not dare to ride in taxis. Many taxi drivers considered his speech impacting and discriminating against them.

For some time, taxis in Taiwan were required to be yellow. The common color scheme led to taxis being known by the colloquialism "little yellow". This stipulation was relaxed in 2016, as regulations applying to taxis and ridesharing companies were amended. Uber entered the Taiwan market as an information service provider in 2013, and began operating what the Ministry of Economic Affairs Investment Commission determined was a passenger car service instead. After this finding, an amendment to the Highway Act was passed in December 2016, increasing the fines levied on illegal taxi service operators.

As a result, many ridesharing companies withdrew from Taiwan. In 2017, new regulations came into force, permitting rideshare companies to partner with vehicle rental companies, and stating that rideshare drivers must be licensed commercial drivers. A 2019 amendment to Article 103-1 of the Transportation Management Regulations, dubbed the "Uber clause," barred rideshare companies from forming partnerships with vehicle rental agencies. That same year, Taiwan began to offer multipurpose taxi service driver exams. Drivers for such services do not have to use yellow vehicles, and are paid a metered fare, but passengers must use an app to make initial contact.

=== Thailand ===
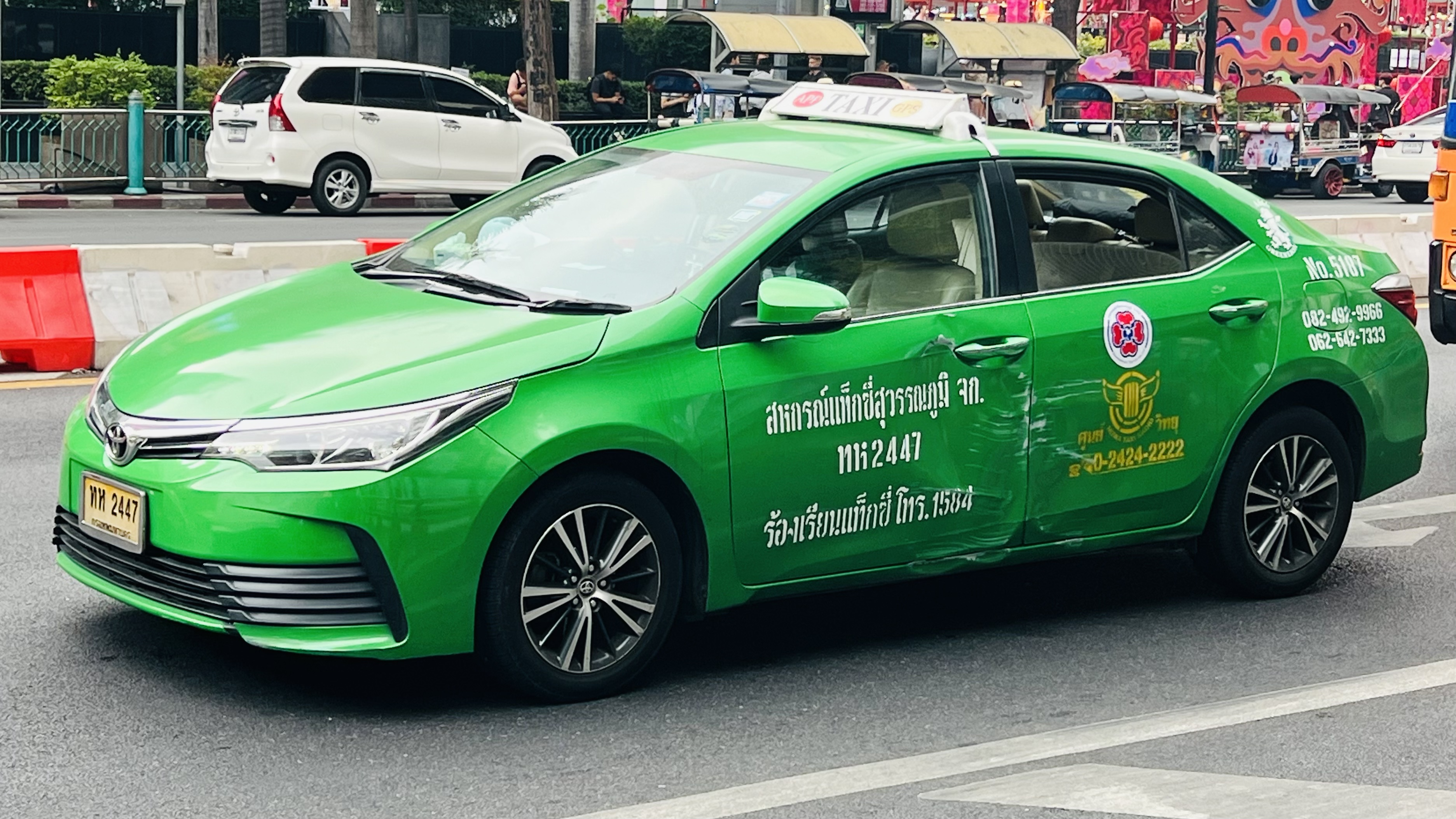
Bangkok brightly coloured taxi - Toyota Corolla Altis

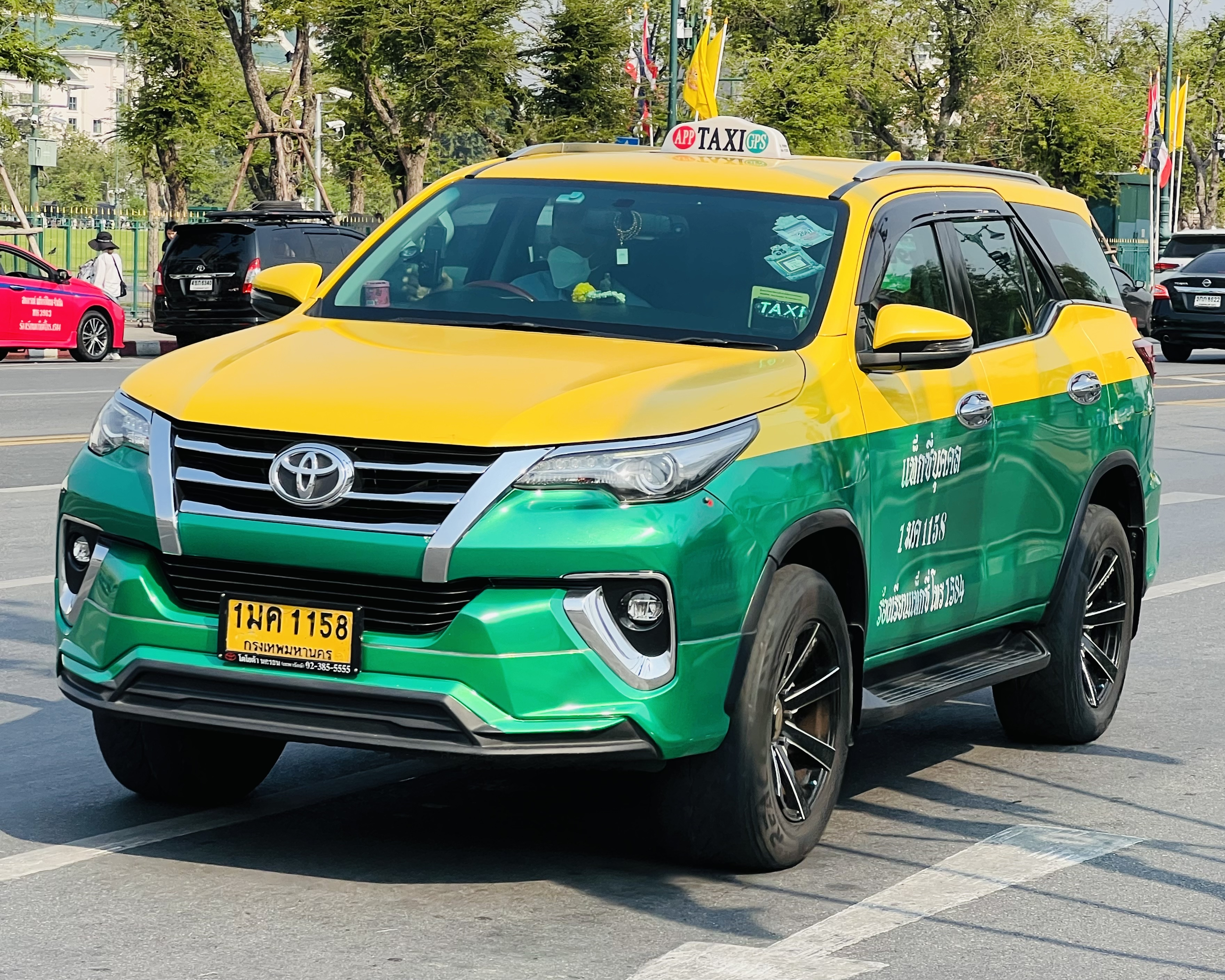
Bangkok bicoloured taxi - Toyota Fortuner

Taxis are widely available in Bangkok and come in many different colours (because of different groups or companies). Most are metered.

Bangkok taxis come in various colours, including single-colour, bi-colour and single-colour with strip. The single-colour taxis are a company taxi, personal taxi in cooperation or alliance, and rental company taxi. The colours include bright green, bright sky blue, red, orange, yellow, blue, pink, purple, violet and tan. There are three kinds of bi-colour taxis, including yellow and green, red and blue and yellow and orange. The yellow and green taxis are personal private taxis. The red and blue taxis are rental taxis. Yellow and orange are company taxis.

In Bangkok, there are also airport taxis known as AOT Limousine. These cars are in silver.

There are also taxis in Phuket, Chiang Mai, Samui, Nakhon Ratchasima, Khon Kaen, Udon Thani and Chonburi using similar cars as in Bangkok.

=== Vietnam ===
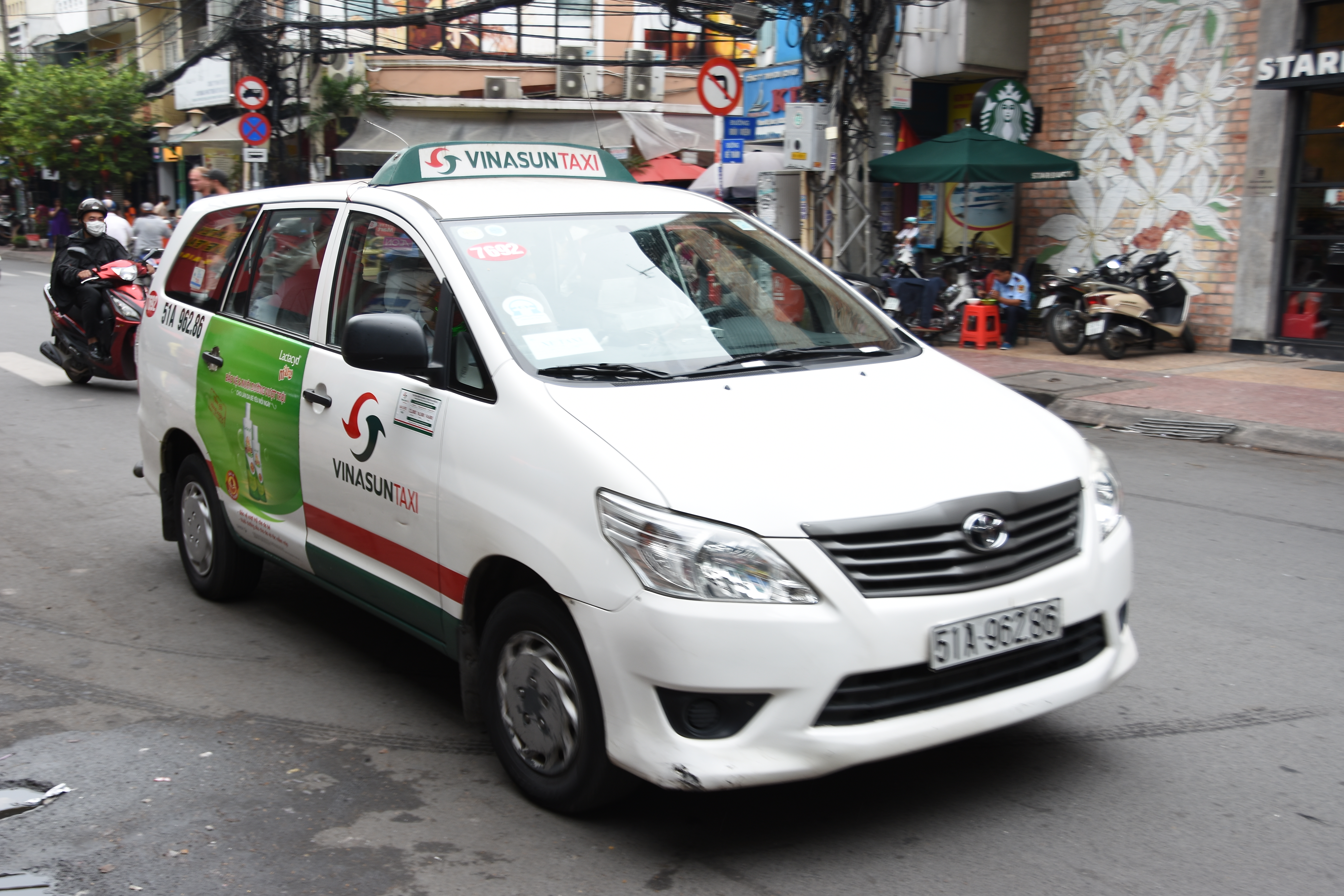
Vinasun Toyota Innova in Ho Chi Minh City

The regular Vietnamese taxi market is dominated by two firms, Mai Linh Group and Vinasun. Motorbike taxis, known as xe ôm, are also common. The main ride-hailing app operators are Grab and Go Viet, a subsidiary of Gojek. Unlicensed taxi drivers and transport services are known for soliciting customers rudely.

== Europe ==
=== Bulgaria ===
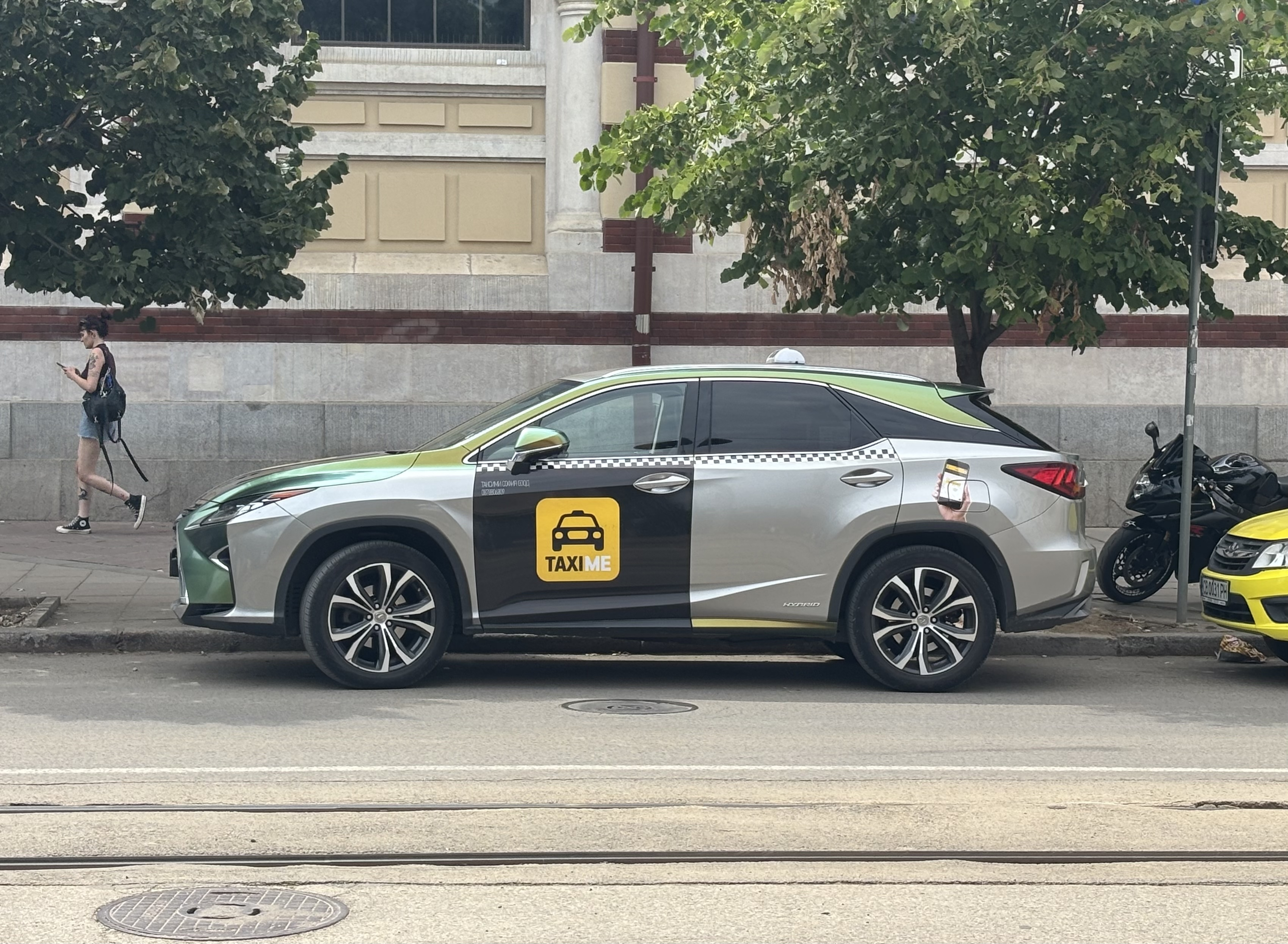
Electric Taxi in Sofia with App Advertisement, Bulgaria

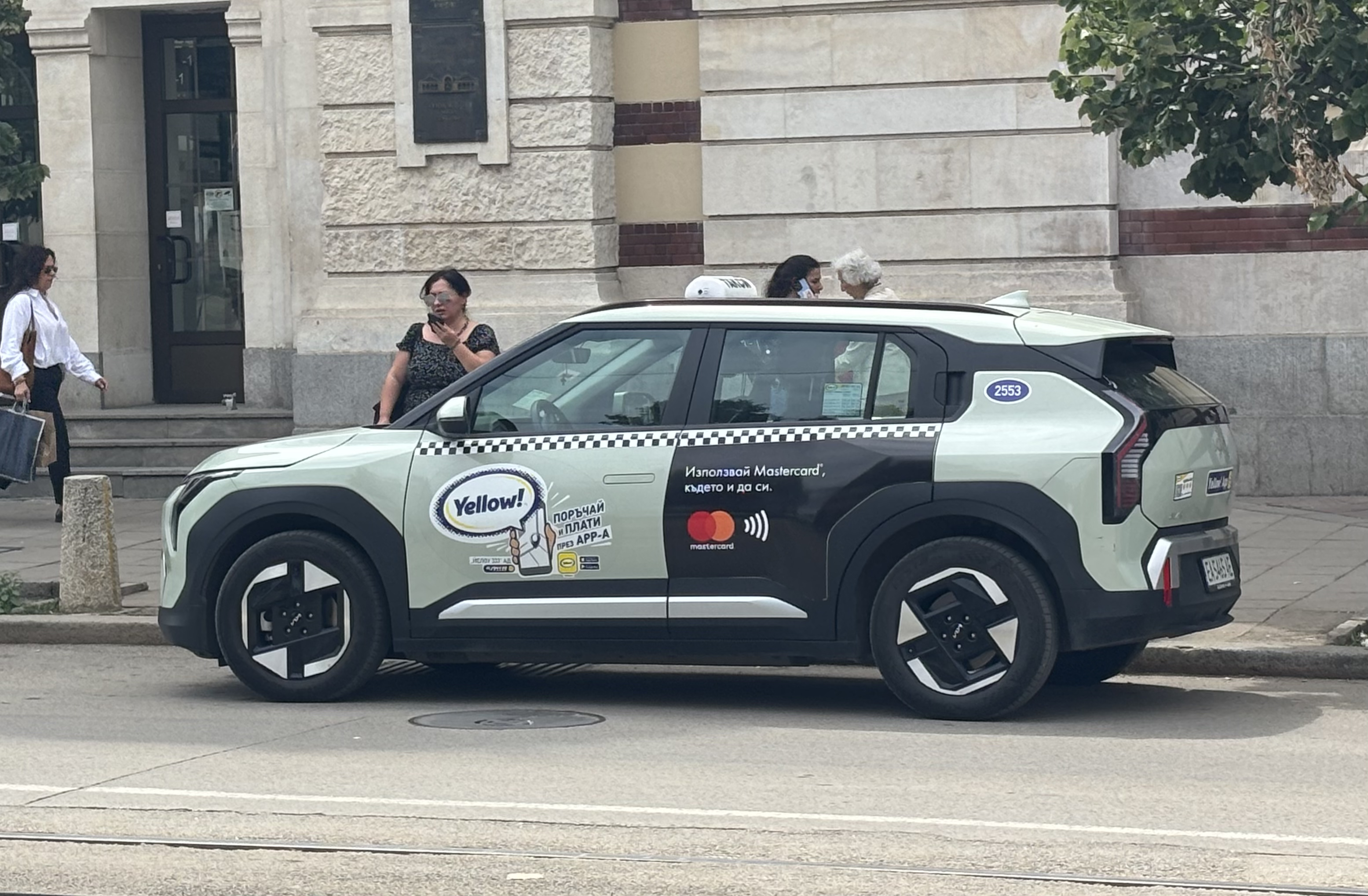
Electric Taxi in Sofia with App Advertisement, Bulgaria

Until the fall of socialism in Bulgaria, all taxis were VAZ-2101 and Moskvitch 2138. Today, in Sofia, Hyundai Sonata taxis are mainly found. In 2013, "green" Toyota Prius taxis were introduced.

=== Finland ===
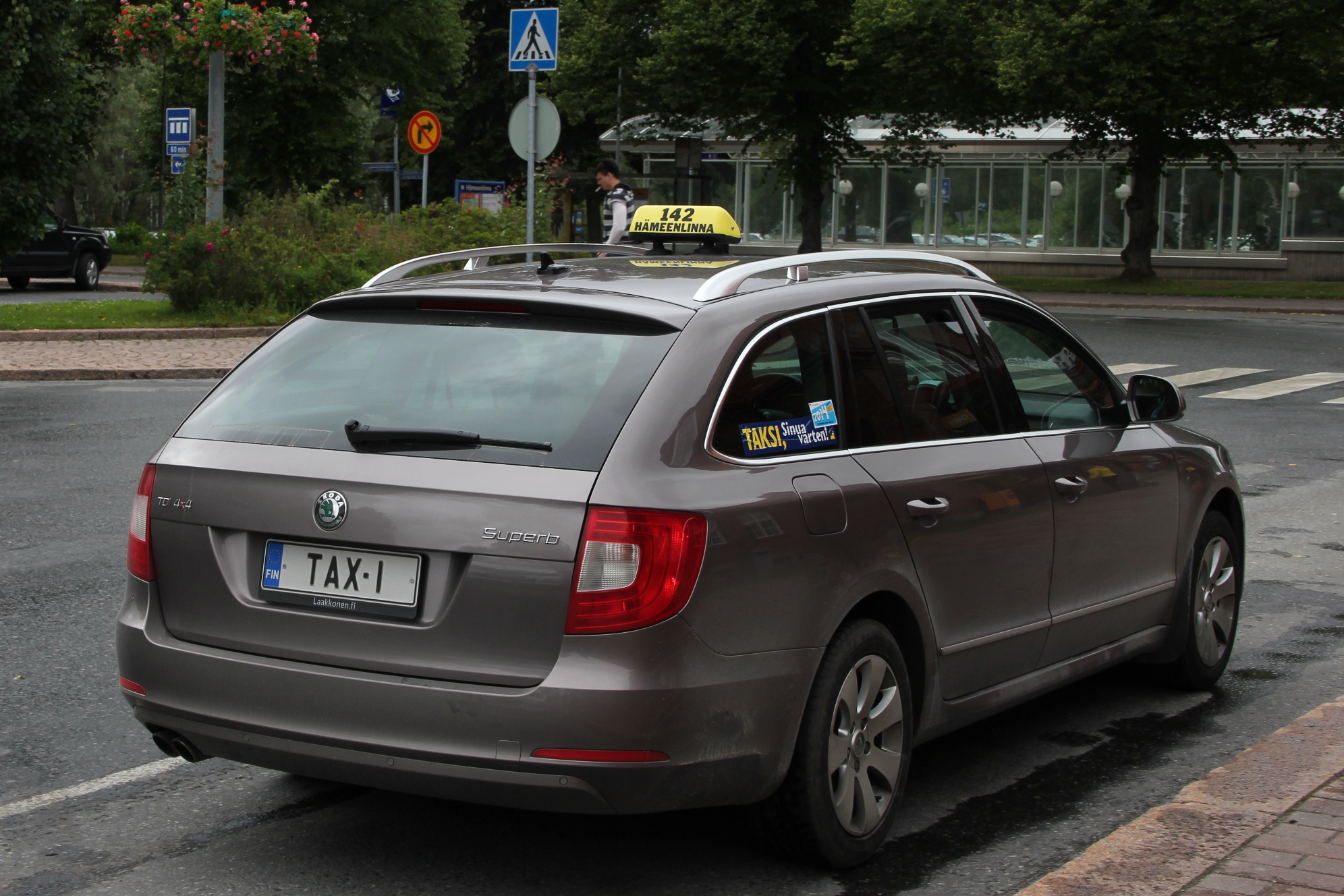
Skoda Superb Combi taxi in Finland

After World War II, Russian cars, especially Pobeda and Volga, dominated the taxi market in Finland for several years. In the late 1950s, the import restriction on cars was lifted for taxi operators, which made it feasible to import western cars in larger numbers. By the end of the 1960s, Mercedes-Benz in particular had gained a dominant position, accounting for up to half the taxi stock, and the Finnish distributor of Mercedes, VEHO, even has a separate taxi sales department. Mercedes has remained the archetypal taxi ever since, although other makes such as Volvo (especially estate models) and Volkswagen Audi Group (VAG) brands are also common.

Taxis in Finland do not have to be liveried in any particular colour or pattern. They are recognisable from the yellow TAKSI sign on the roof, which is illuminated when the taxi is available for hire. Taxis mainly gather at special taxi ranks, instead of being hailed. Customers either walk to the taxi rank and take the first available taxi from the front of the queue, or wait at the rank for a taxi to appear. One can also order a taxi by telephone or app to a specific address.

=== Germany ===
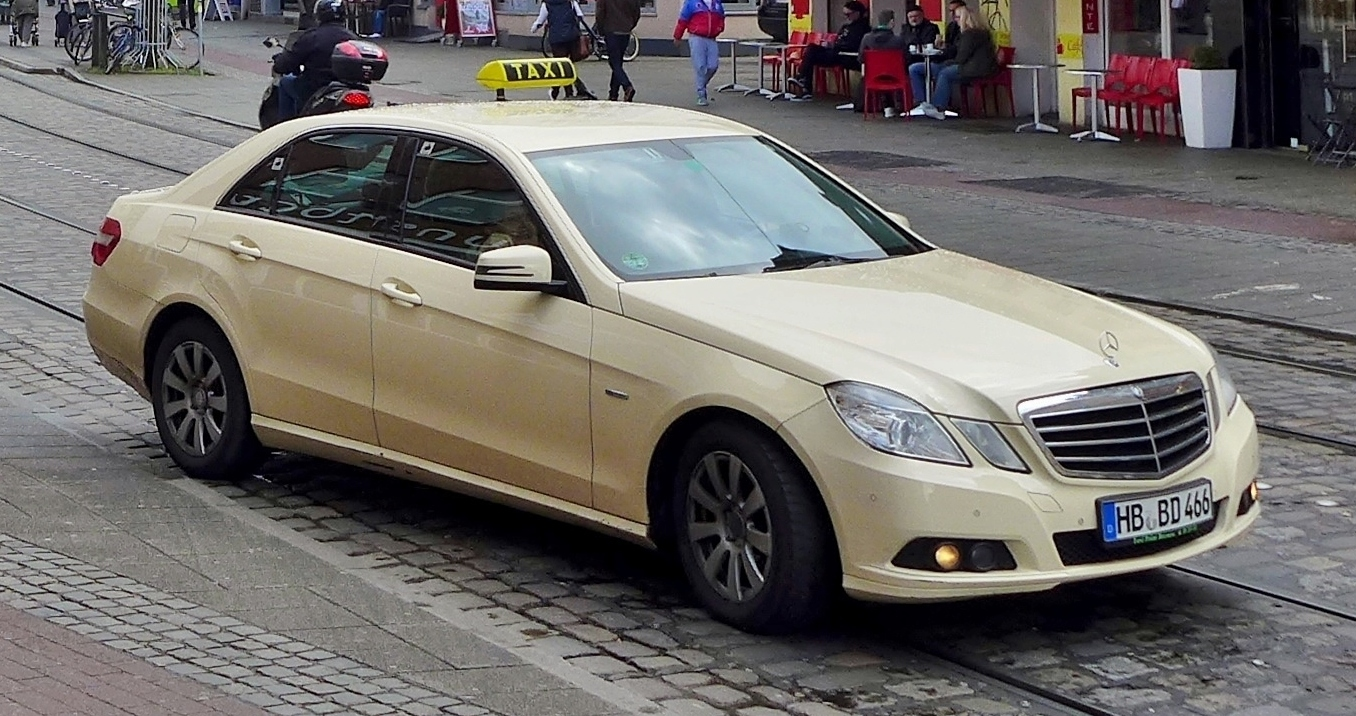
Mercedes-Benz E-Class taxi in Germany

An important event in the history of the taxi was the invention of the taximeter by Friedrich Wilhelm Gustav Bruhn, a German engineer, in 1891. The Daimler Victoria —the world's first meter-equipped (and gasoline-powered) taxicab—was built by Gottlieb Daimler in 1897, and began operation in Stuttgart that same year.

In Germany, taxis were required by law until November 2005 to be light ivory (RAL number 1015). Before 1971, they were required to be black. There is a small illuminated TAXI sign on the roof of the car (on when available, off otherwise). Typically the taxicabs are Mercedes-Benz E-Class and S-Class, along with other, mainly German, brands. Taxicabs are either sedans, station wagons, or MPVs.

Common station wagon taxicabs include Mercedes-Benz C-Class. Among the MPVs, Mercedes-Benz B-Class, and Mercedes-Benz Vianos are common. Most taxicabs have automatic transmission, and some have navigation systems on board. Fares are usually close to those of other western European countries.

Although allowed, street hailing is relatively uncommon in Germany because cabs rarely circle the cities when vacant. Because there are relatively few customers, most cabs return to assigned waiting stations and are called on-demand. Although this has proven to be more economical for cab drivers, it is considered very inconvenient for commuters because taxis include the ride from the waiting station to the pickup point in the fare.

=== Hungary ===
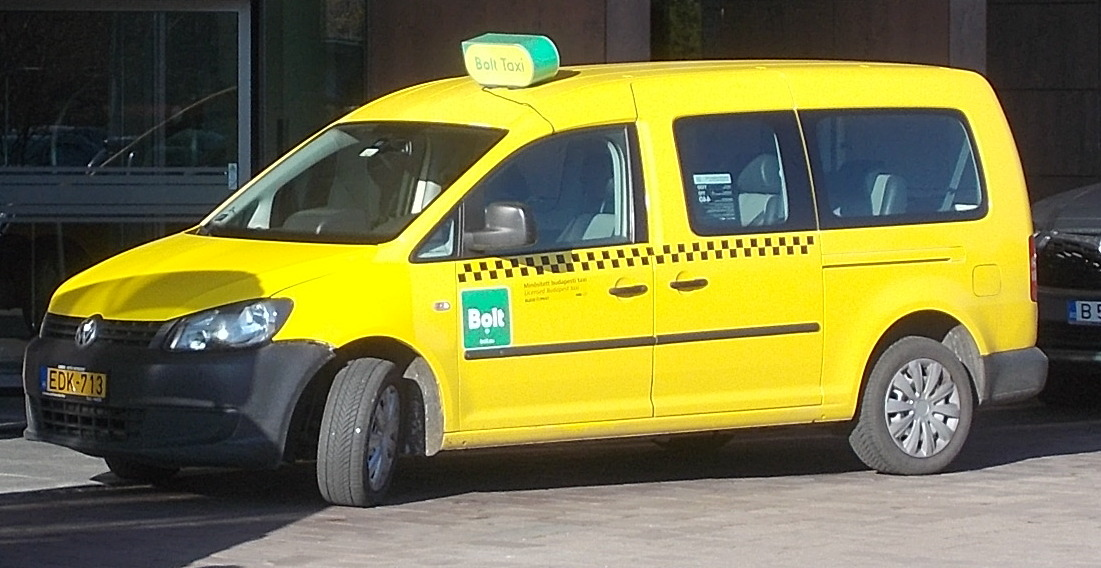
VW Caddy taxi

In Budapest, the capital of Hungary, all taxis must be painted yellow since 2013 and vehicles must be younger than 10 years old.

=== Ireland ===
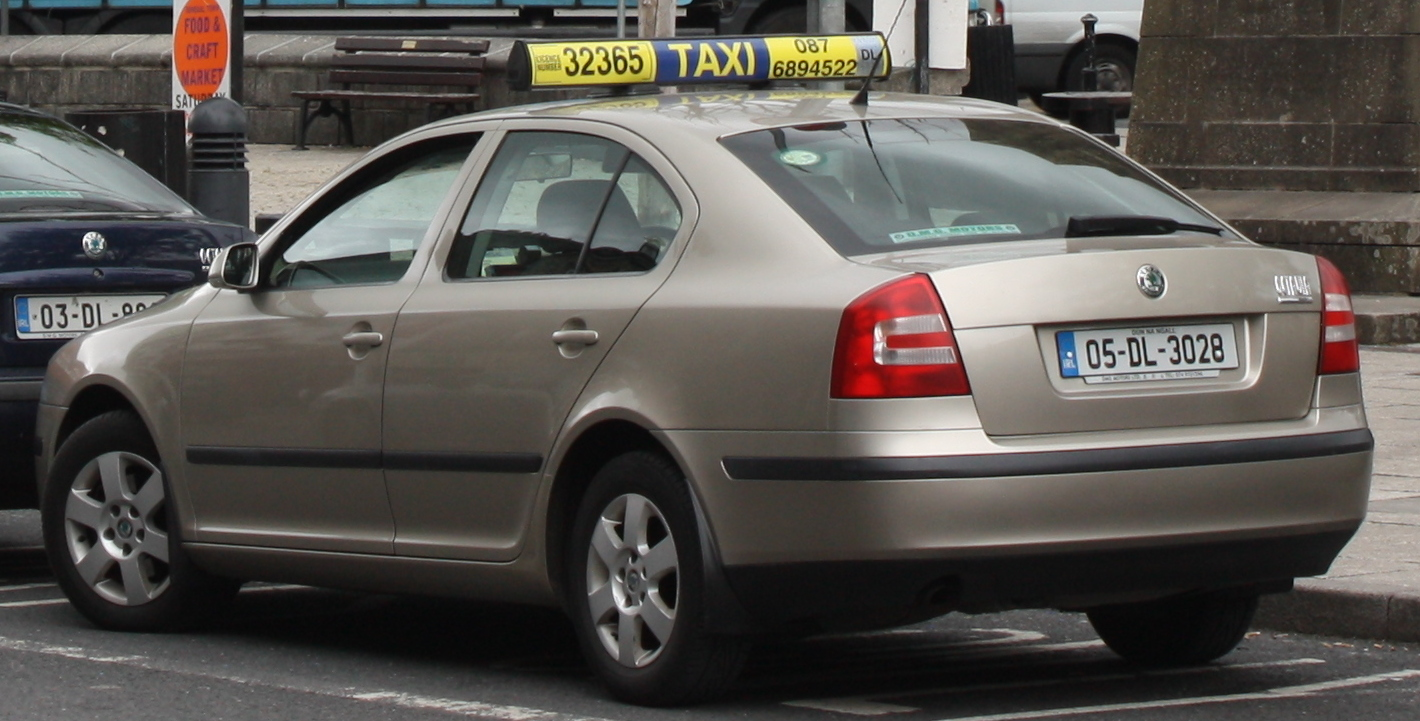
A taxi in Ireland

In the Republic of Ireland, the term taxi is reserved for vehicles that may pick up on streets and where the fare is determined by a meter. Taxi vehicles do not have to be a particular colour but all carry a distinctive roof sign with the licence number prominently displayed, some with the Irish word TACSAÍ instead of the usual TAXI.

Additionally, a sticker or stickers determine their boundaries by county; these stickers carry a letter or letters reflecting the number plate county code (e.g. D=Dublin, MH=Meath etc.) (for full list, see vehicle registration plates of Ireland). And as of January 2013, a green and blue TAXI sticker is required on the front doors. In September 2006 a nationwide taxi fare system was introduced so that charges no longer depend on the county or city council area.

The term hackney is used in Ireland to refer to a service which can only carry passengers from a pre-booked destination (or the hackney company's office) to another destination, similar to a minicab in Britain. Such vehicles are indicated by a small yellow plate above the registration plate with the word Hackney and the licence information. They normally operate for an agreed fare.

Both taxis and hackneys are licensed by the National Transport Authority.

=== Italy ===
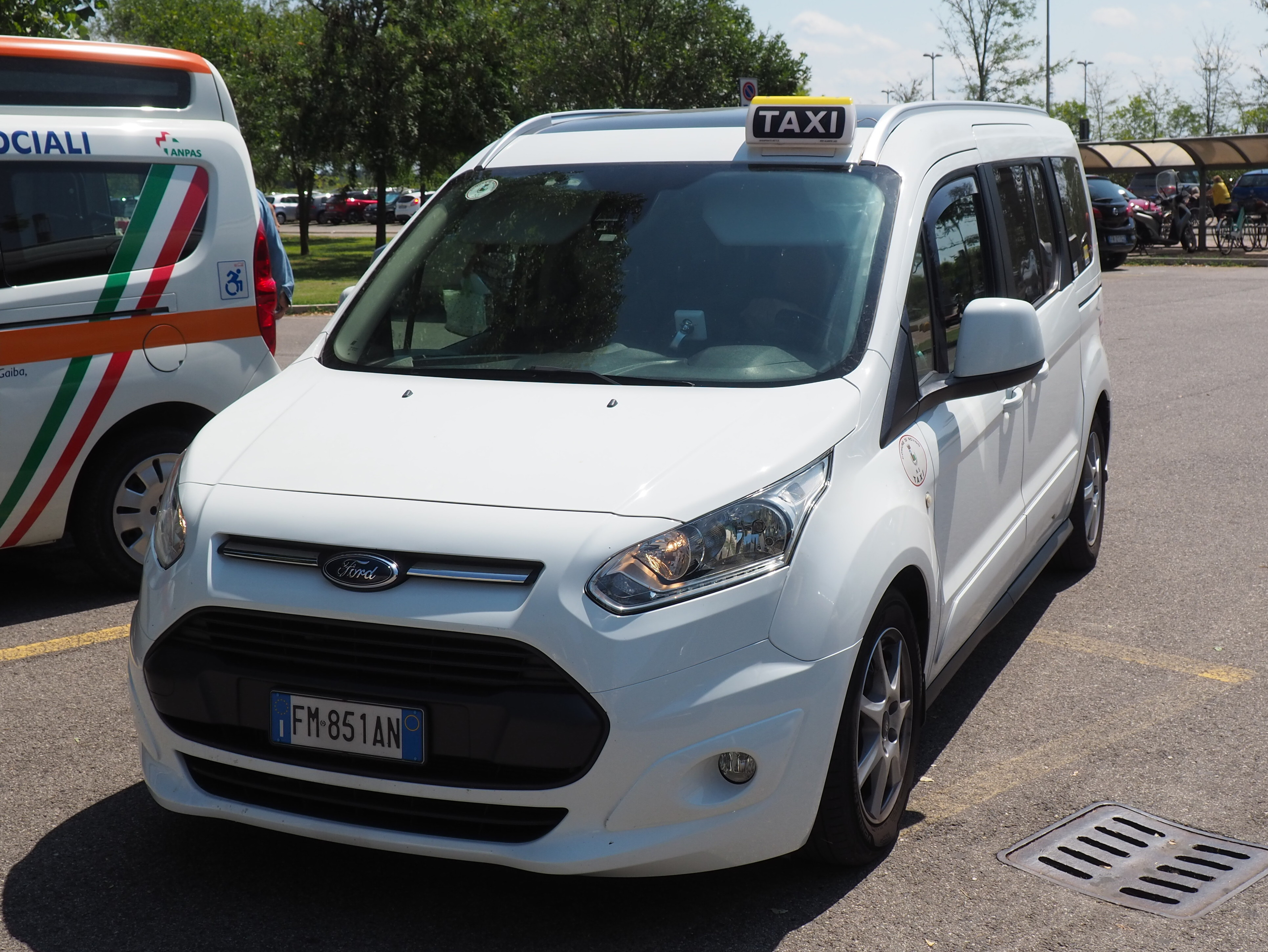
Taxicab in Italy

In Italy, taxicabs are white (previously they were yellow, in the 1950s and 1960s they were green-black or red), with a small illuminated TAXI white (previously red) sign on a black background on the roof of the car. There are 25,186 taxis in the country (1 for every 2,412 people). Mercedes-Benz, Ford and Fiat models are common. MPV or minivan taxicabs are also prevalent, such as the Fiat Multipla, Fiat Ulysse, Fiat Doblo and Ford Galaxy. There is at the present time a harsh political struggle between people who advocate deregulation of taxi licences and those who are against it.

=== Lithuania ===
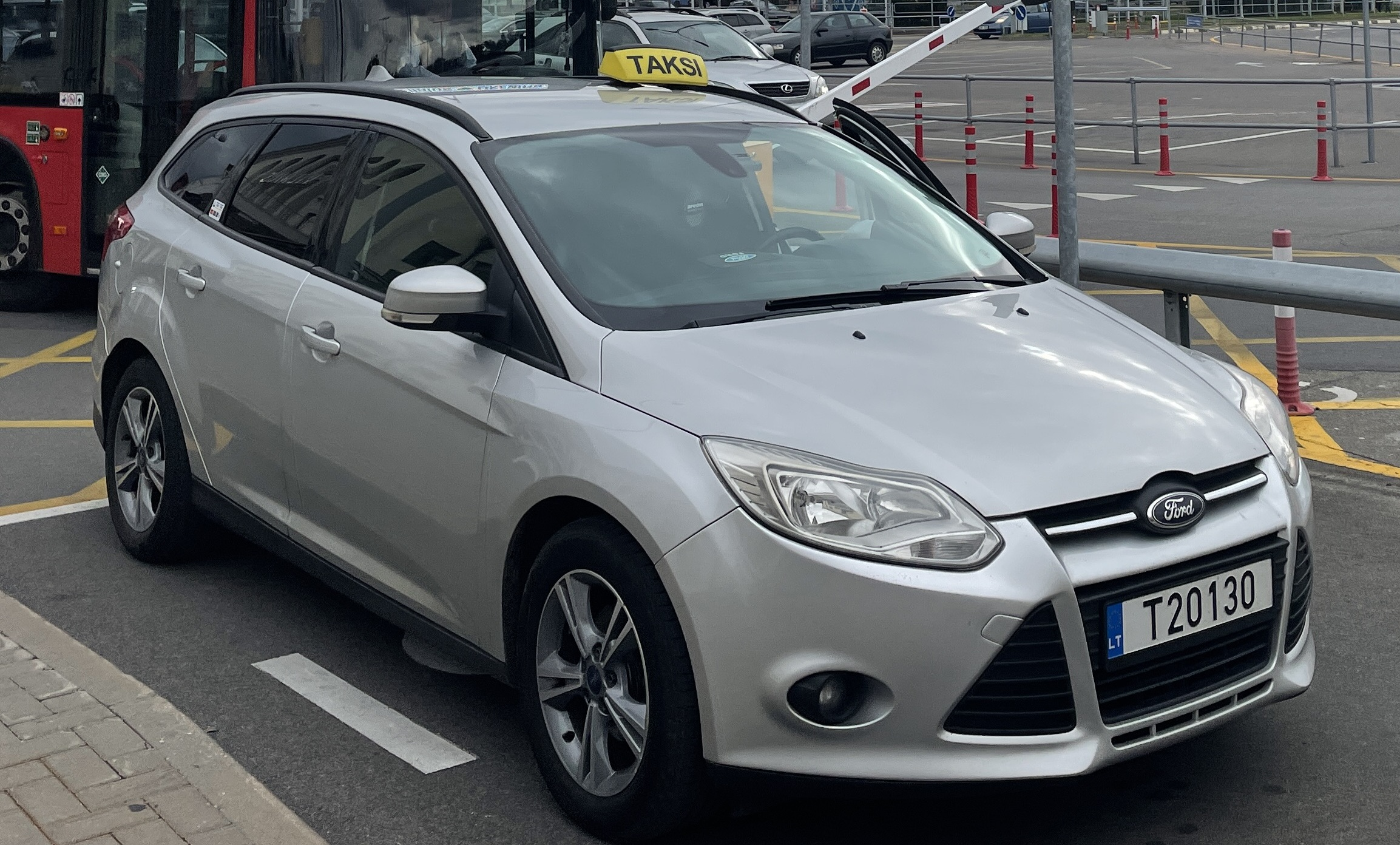
Taxi in Lithuania

In Lithuania taxicabs are called taksi; all of them have a small, yellow illuminated cylinder-like Taksi sign on the roof of the car and a black and yellow checkered pattern on the sides. In the capital city Vilnius, taxicabs are divided into two categories: expensive and cheap. Expensive ones (i.e. Vilnius veža) charge 3.99 LTL to get in and 2.39-2.99 LTL per kilometer.

They use white, brand new Ford C-Max or Volkswagen Touran models, allow passengers to pay for the trip using a credit card, use tablet computers instead of radio to communicate, and the drivers have special uniforms. Cheap taxis in Lithuania mostly use older high-end vehicles such as Volkswagen Passat (B4) or Audi A6 (C4) instead of the Chevrolet Spark or similar. They charge 2 LTL to get in and around 2 LTL per kilometer. They do not have a specific color and can be recognized only by a yellow Taksi sign on the roof or black and yellow checkered pattern on the sides.

=== Netherlands ===
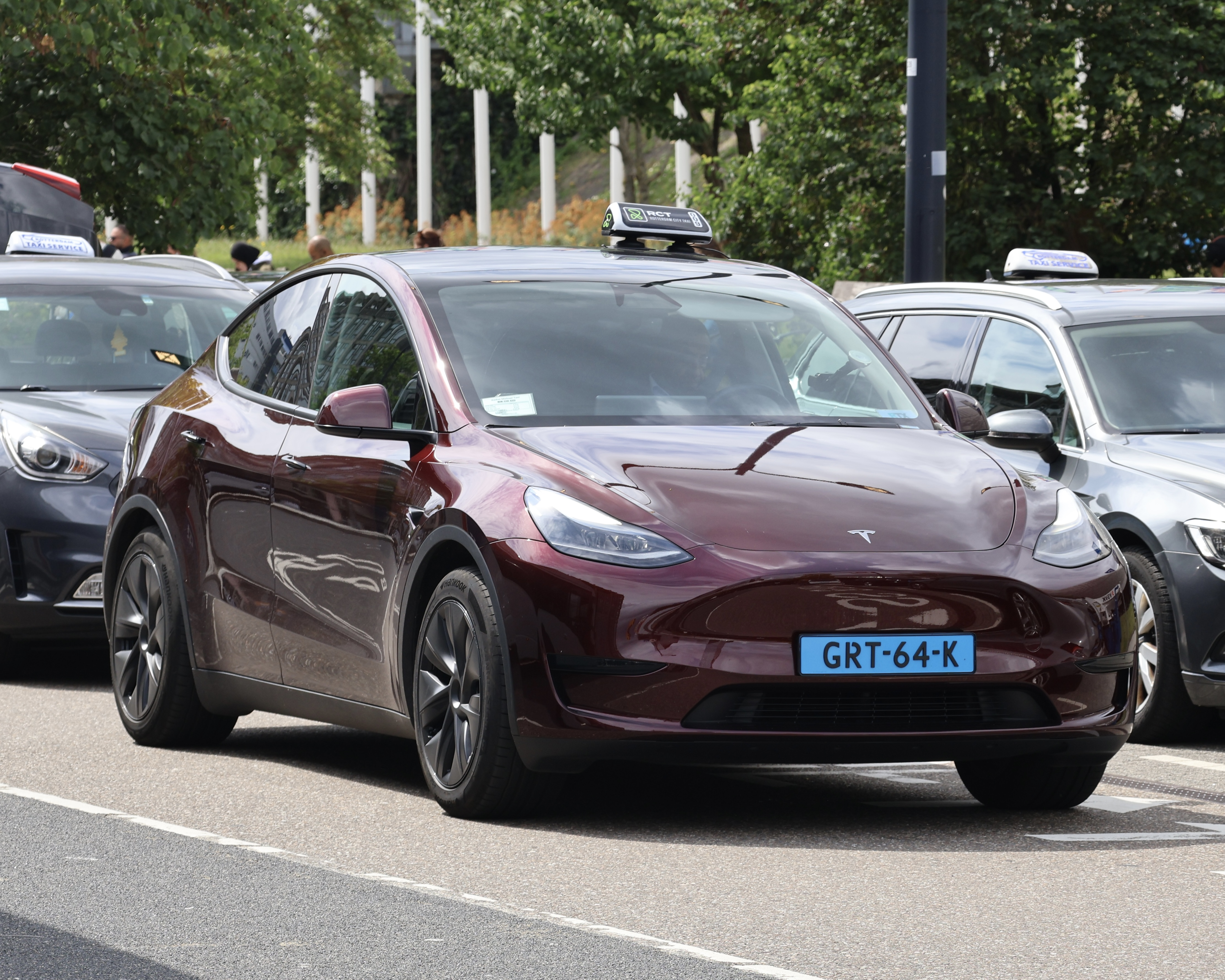
Tesla Mod Y in Amsterdam

In the Netherlands, electric Tesla cars are slowly replacing diesel and petrol cabs. All taxis have light blue license plates with black characters.

=== Norway ===
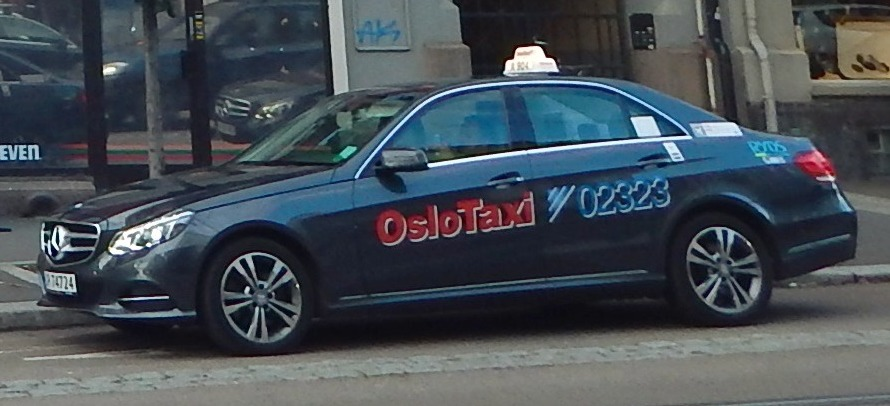
Mercedes-Benz E-Class taxi in Norway

In Norway, the end of 2009 roster showed that 41.9% of the 8961 taxicabs were from Mercedes-Benz, and several manufacturers that can offer a diesel-engined executive car are represented. 91.6% of Norwegian taxis are equipped with diesel engines. Among maxitaxis (minibuses operating as taxis), Mercedes-Benz vehicles such as the Mercedes-Benz Sprinter constitute 70% of the fleet.

Taxicabs are usually distinguished by small company decals on the bonnet and doors and an illuminated "taxi" sign on the roof (the internationally recognised word taxi is almost always used, rather than the Norwegian word drosje; the term maxitaxi is used informally to refer to minibuses used as taxis). There is no particular colour for taxicabs though various shades of black and silver are the most popular choices of colour. Fares are always metered, although there may be fixed tariffs for certain journeys such as airport-to-city-centre.

In 2011, the most popular models of vehicles used as taxis were the Mercedes E-class, Toyota Prius, and Volvo V70, accounting for more than half of the taxi fleet. The Mercedes-Benz E-classes is the most common new cab, with the hybrid Toyota Prius in second place, the latter having increased its sales due to the tax regime favoring low carbon dioxide emissions.

=== Russia ===
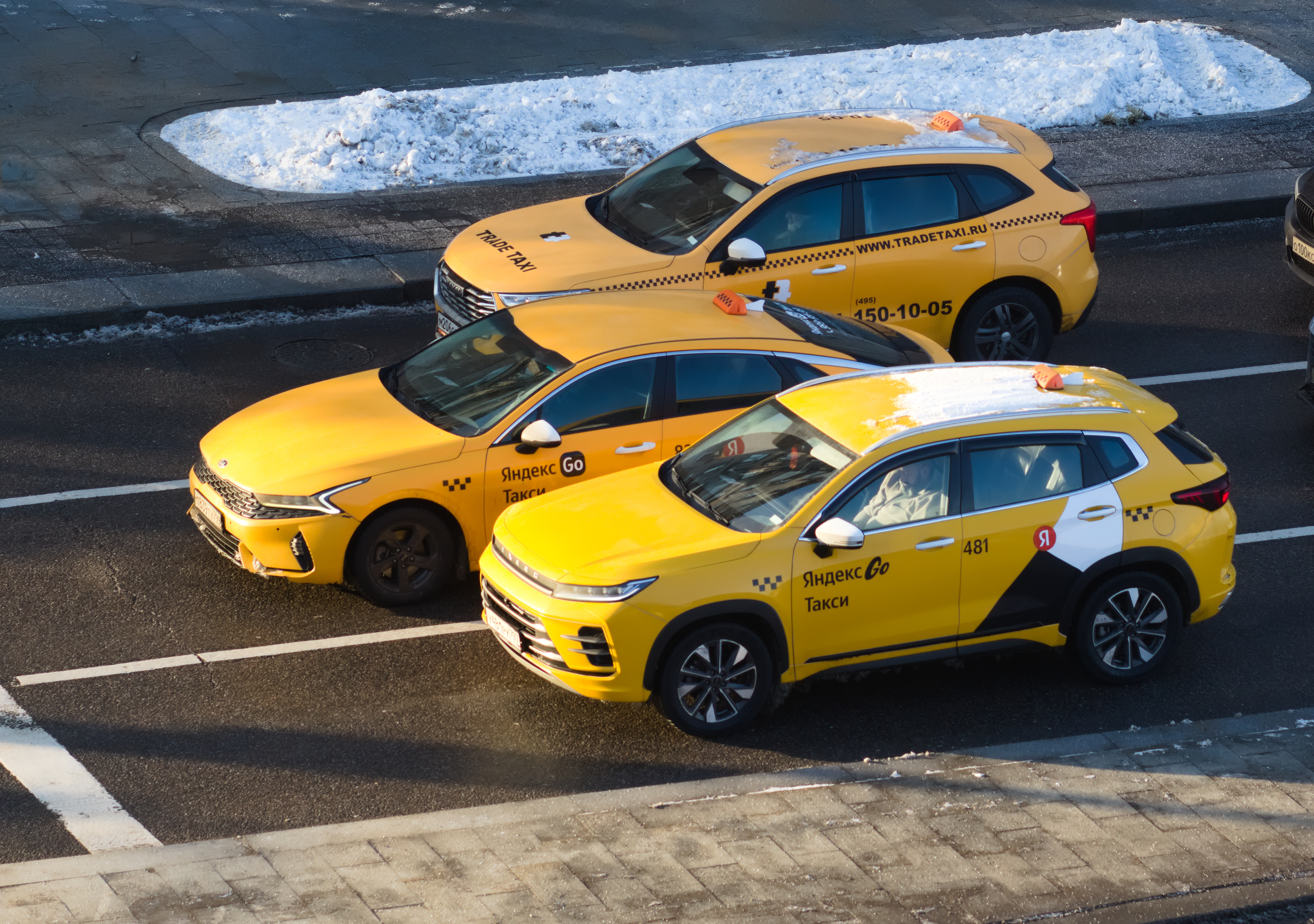
Moscow taxicabs

Regulated official taxicabs, identifiable by their yellow livery (from the 1st of July all taxis in Moscow must be painted in RAL 1006 [maize yellow]); they are relatively few in Moscow, however, since any car can be used as a taxi. There is a long tradition of so-called (in English) 'gypsy-cabs' that comprise most of the city's fleet.

These are private motorists, typically in Lada 1300s or similar vehicles, who will pick up passengers in the street. For some drivers, gypsy-cab work is their main source of income, whereas many others will cruise around after finishing their day jobs. Some Muscovites who are not driving specifically for hire will nevertheless pick up paying passengers traveling in the direction of their own destination.

Gypsy-cabs can be hailed quickly in central Moscow by stepping up to the curb and raising a hand. Driver and passenger will negotiate a price through the front window; though occasionally the driver does not wish to go to the requested destination or the passenger and driver cannot agree on a mutually acceptable price, in which case the car may leave and the passenger is able to try their luck with another one.

While there is obviously a risk of crime in getting into a stranger's car in any city, using gypsy-cabs in Moscow is seen as relatively safe, though the British Embassy in the city officially discourages the practice.

In contrast to taxicabs, pre-booked private-hire vehicles are readily available in Moscow on a conventional commercial basis.

Traditional cabs in the Western sense are becoming more and more common, but remain very expensive in comparison to the gypsy cabs.

In Russia there also exists a luxury taxi service where taxis are Maybachs and TechArt Magnums (tuned Porsche Cayennes).

=== Slovenia ===
In Slovenia taxicabs are called TAKSI and there's an inscription on the roof and on the doors. There's no rule for the taxi colour (except in Koper and Sežana where the taxis are white).

=== Spain ===
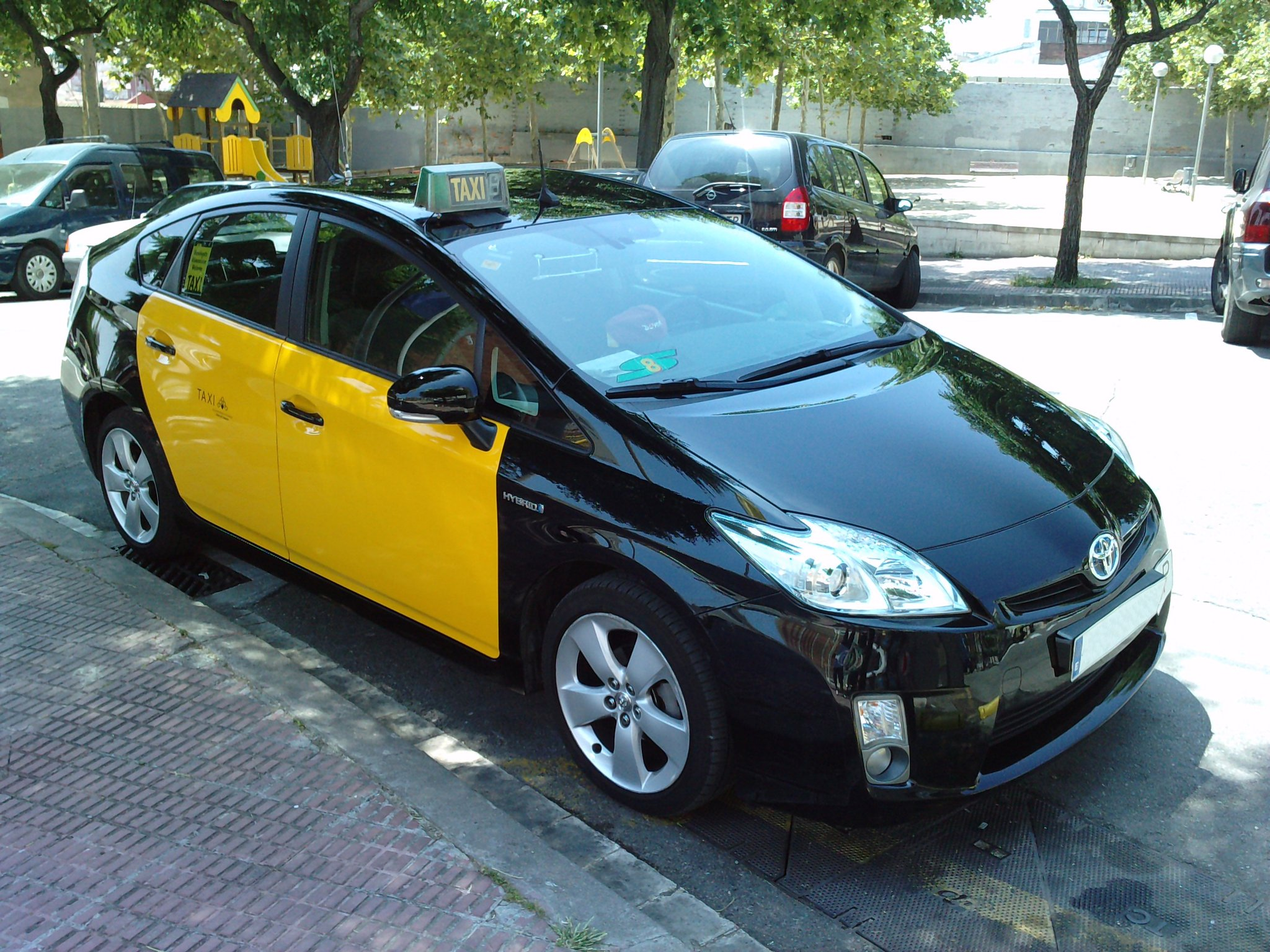
Taxicab in Barcelona

In Spanish cities, as well as in small and large towns, taxicabs always have a meter. The models that can be used must be previously officially approved for this function by the local authorities, and they are always four-door sedans or minivans.

Regarding the livery, each town and city designates the colour of their taxis, but the overwhelming majority are white, usually with some kind of colour detail and/or local symbol on the doors. For example, in Madrid and Almería, taxicabs are white with a red diagonal stripe going through the front doors; in Seville, they are white with a diagonal yellow stripe down the rear doors; in Bilbao, they are white with a horizontal red stripe on the front doors. A notable exception is Barcelona, where taxicabs are fully black, except the doors and the boot lid, which are painted yellow.

=== Sweden ===
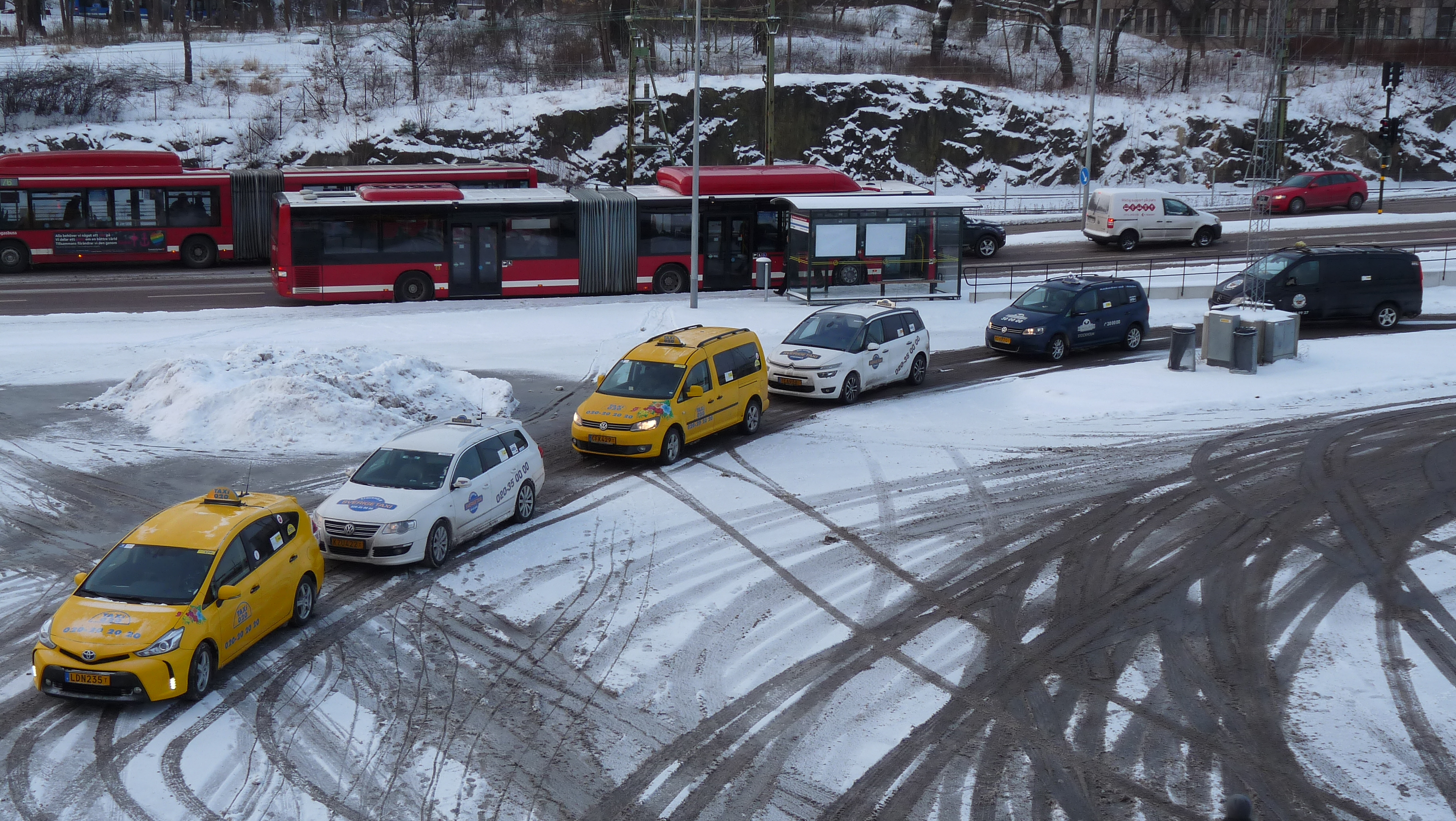
Taxicabs in Stockholm

In Sweden, most taxis are painted black, yellow or dark blue, to some extent depending on the company's guidelines. There are many taxi companies, from big networks to single-car companies. License plates on Swedish registered taxis are yellow and all end with a "T" in a slightly smaller size than the other characters on the license plate. The tariff varies, but all taxis must have a taximeter and a price comparison chart visible in the car.

=== United Kingdom ===
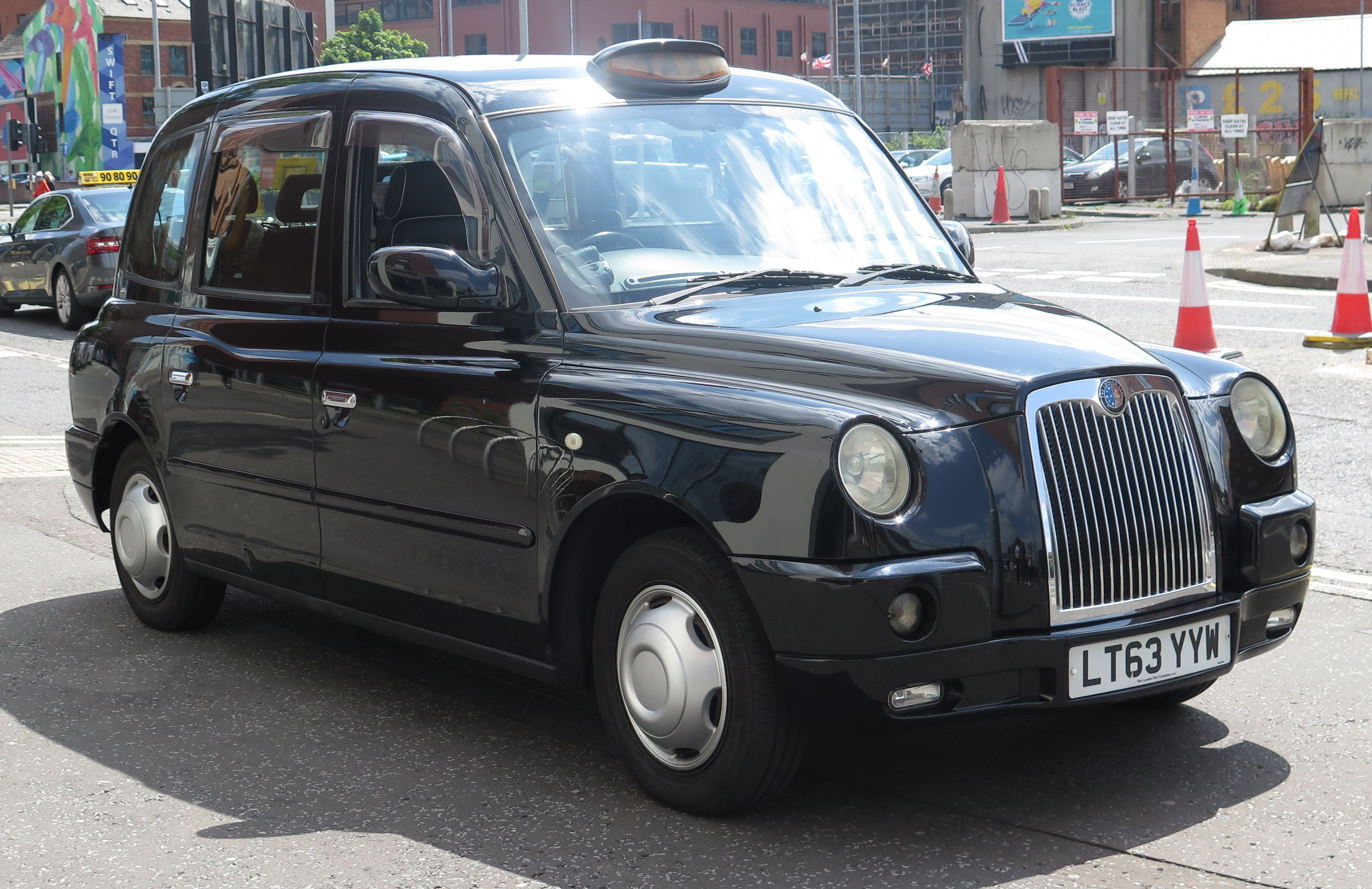
TX4

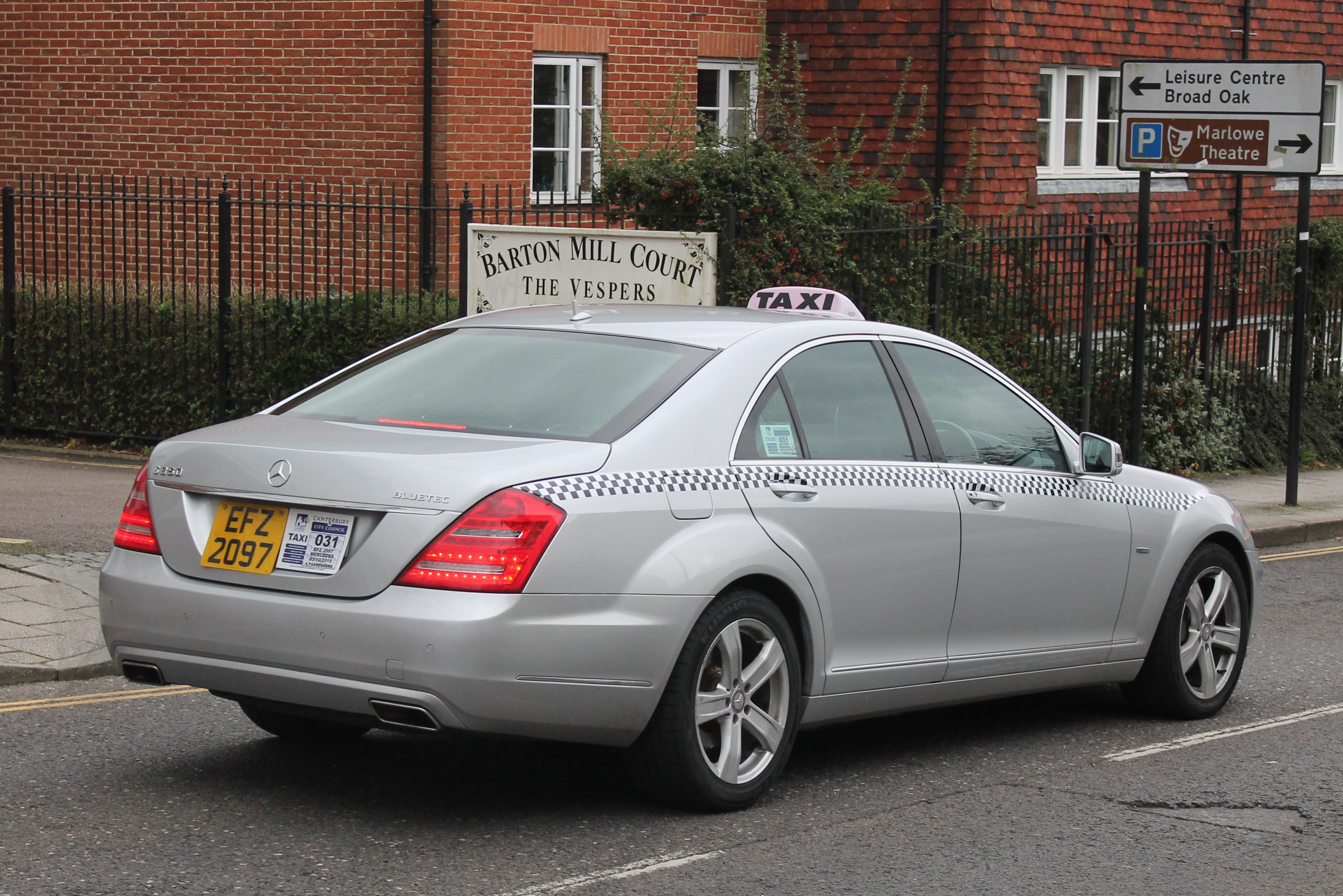
Mercedes-Benz S-Class taxicab in Canterbury

There is a mature system of taxicabs throughout the United Kingdom. In 2015, there were around 298,000 licensed drivers in England, of which 164,000 were private hire licenses, 62,000 were taxi licenses and 72,000 were dual licenses. All taxicabs are regulated with various degrees of sophistication. However, London's black cabs, known historically and legally as hackney carriages, are particularly notable for their vehicles and the extensive training course (The Knowledge) required for fully licensed drivers.

"Hackney carriages" ("black cabs"; but they may be any colour) can be hailed in the street or hired from a taxicab rank. The term "Hackney carriage" can also be applied to standard passenger vehicles authorised by other Local Authorities to stop for passengers on a hail in the district. The fare is calculated on a taximeter that charges by both time and distance.

Taxicab service in London is regulated by Transport for London's strict Conditions of Fitness, mandating size, turning radius, age, and emissions, resulting in its unique vehicles built primarily for the London market such as the LEVC and the Mercedes Vito seen today.

There are two other types of hire vehicles that act as taxis; they are known as private hire vehicles:

- Although not available to be hailed in the street, licensed private hire vehicles can offer a safe alternative to a "Hackney Carriage". The advantage of a private hire booking is that the journey is offered at a fixed price based only on mileage and not the variable time element of a taximeter found in a "Hackney Carriage"; unless the private hire vehicle is fitted with a taximeter in which case this meter must be used to calculate the fare. In many areas private hire and hackney vehicles have different coloured taxi licence plates; and also it is common that hackney carriages must be a certain colour (usually black, hence the term "black cab"), while private hire taxis may be any colour but that prescribed for hackneys.
- Chauffeur cars are a sub-set of private hire and historically have been mostly unlicensed. However, regulations now require them to be licensed. In Scotland most chauffeur/executive car operators along with nearly all stretched limousines are not still not licensed, and neither are their drivers. Generally, a prestige type of car such as a Mercedes or BMW is operated where the passenger pays a premium but in return receives a higher level of comfort and courtesy from the driver who may at times wear a uniform.

In Great Britain local authorities have the responsibility of regulating taxi and private hire vehicles together with their drivers. Licensed vehicles will normally have an ID plate at the rear, and sometimes also at the front, which shows information such as the licence number, expiry date, and how many passengers it may carry.

Luton is reported to have the highest number of taxicabs per head of population in the United Kingdom.

== North America ==
=== Mexico ===
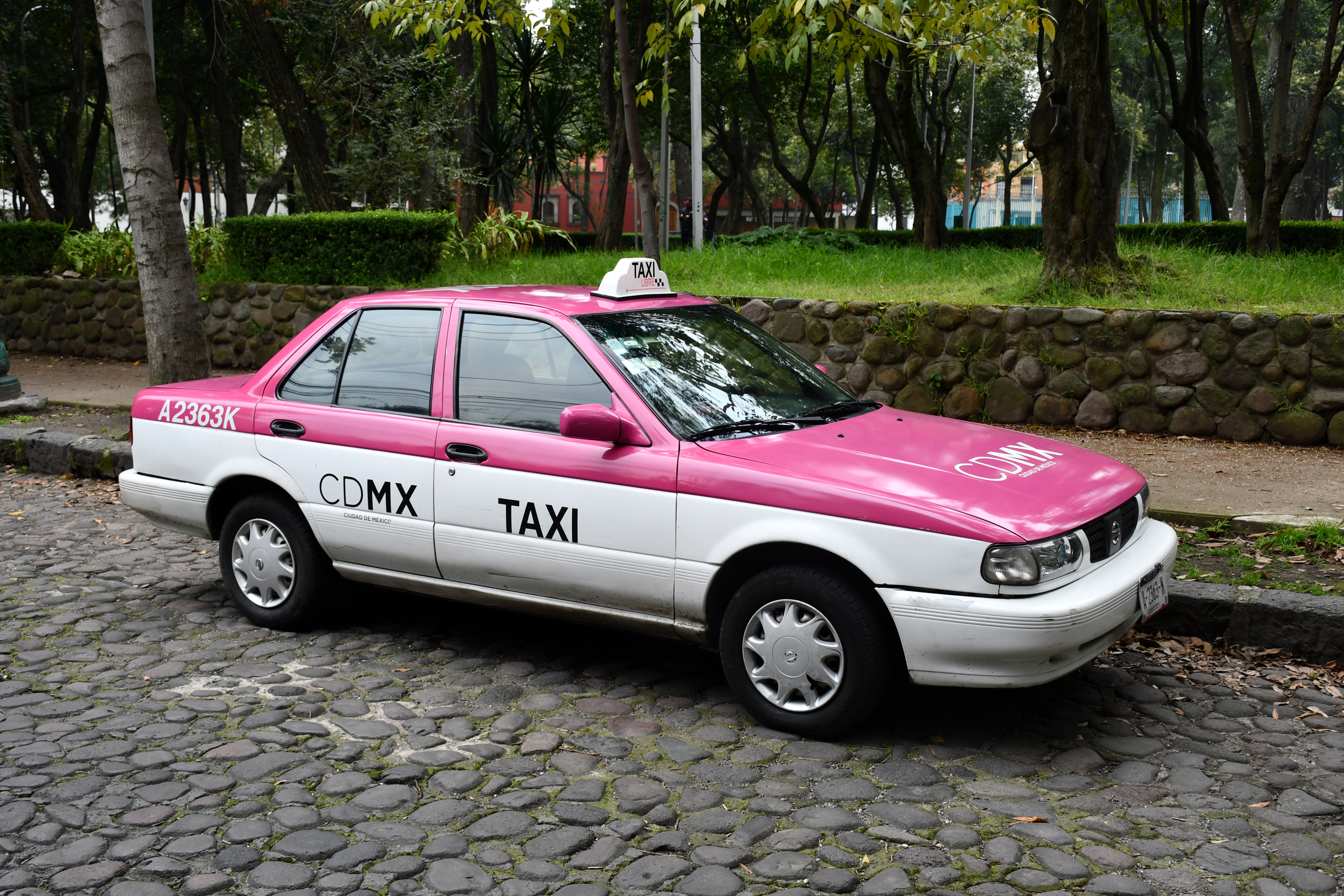
Taxi in Mexico City with the Mexican pink and white design in use since 2014

In Mexico City, according to Mexican legislation introduced in 2001, public taxicabs (in contrast with private taxicabs, or taxis de sitio) must be four-door, painted in red with a white roof, and almost all new taxis are Nissan Tsurus. Using taxis that do not have an updated color scheme (the current one is white and pink) is not recommended, as these tend to be unregulated.

=== Trinidad and Tobago ===
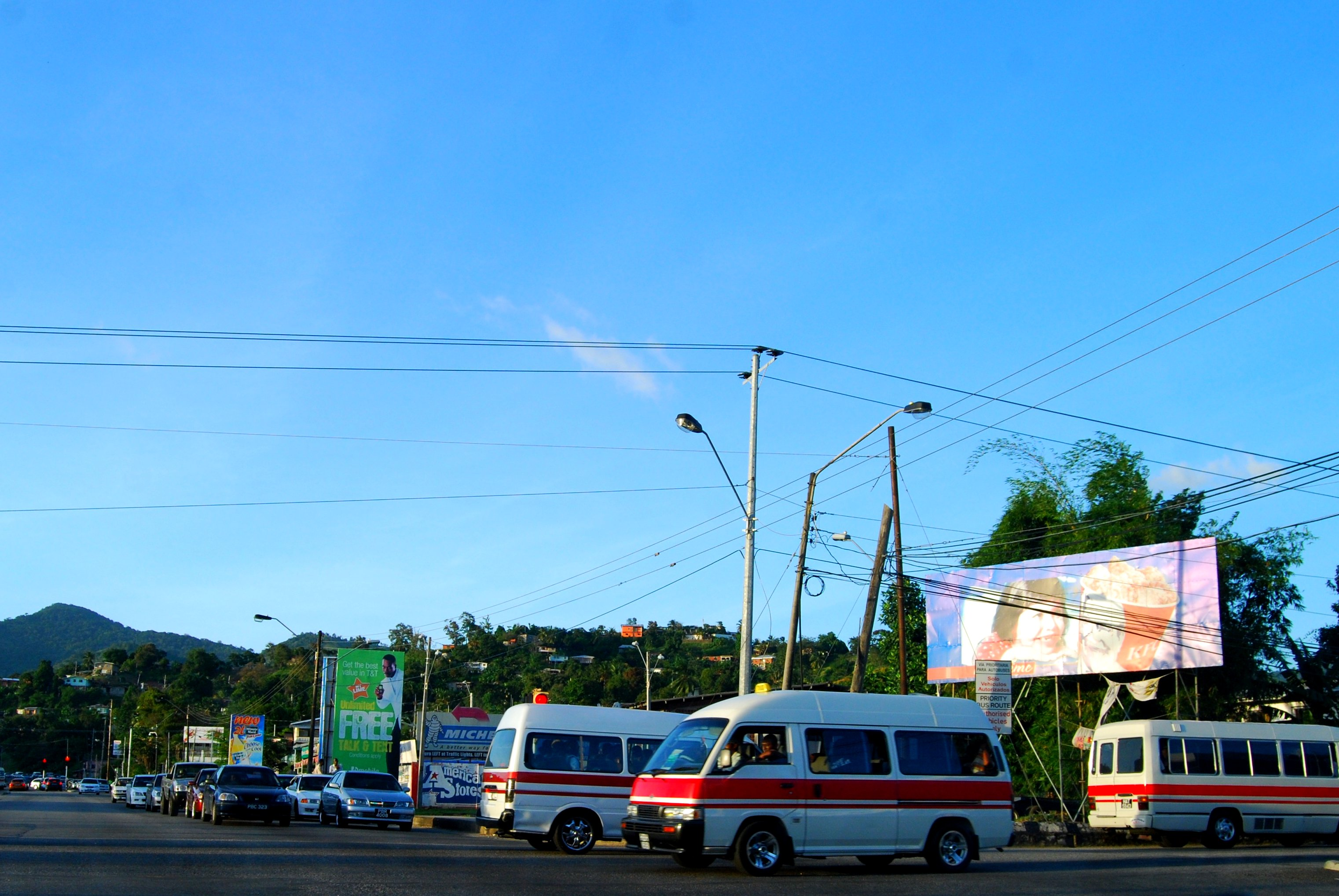
Maxi taxi in Trinidad

In Trinidad and Tobago the vehicles most commonly used as taxis are fifth-generation Nissan Cedrics, fifth and sixth-generation Nissan Laurels, 6th to 8th generation Toyota Crowns, Datsun Bluebirds and any other vehicles registered with an "H". However, in Trinidad, many cars still operate as taxicabs without being registered. These "illegal" taxicabs are called "PH" or "P/H" taxis due to the fact that private cars are registered with a "P", for example, "PAU 6767". Private taxi companies are scarce and expensive, hence all taxis in Trinidad are both driver-managed and driver-operated. Privately owned taxis vary in colour and model, therefore one would almost never see a yellow cab in Trinidad and Tobago. Unlike maxi taxis that are colour-coded to a specific area, taxicabs are not colour-coded.

=== United States and Canada ===
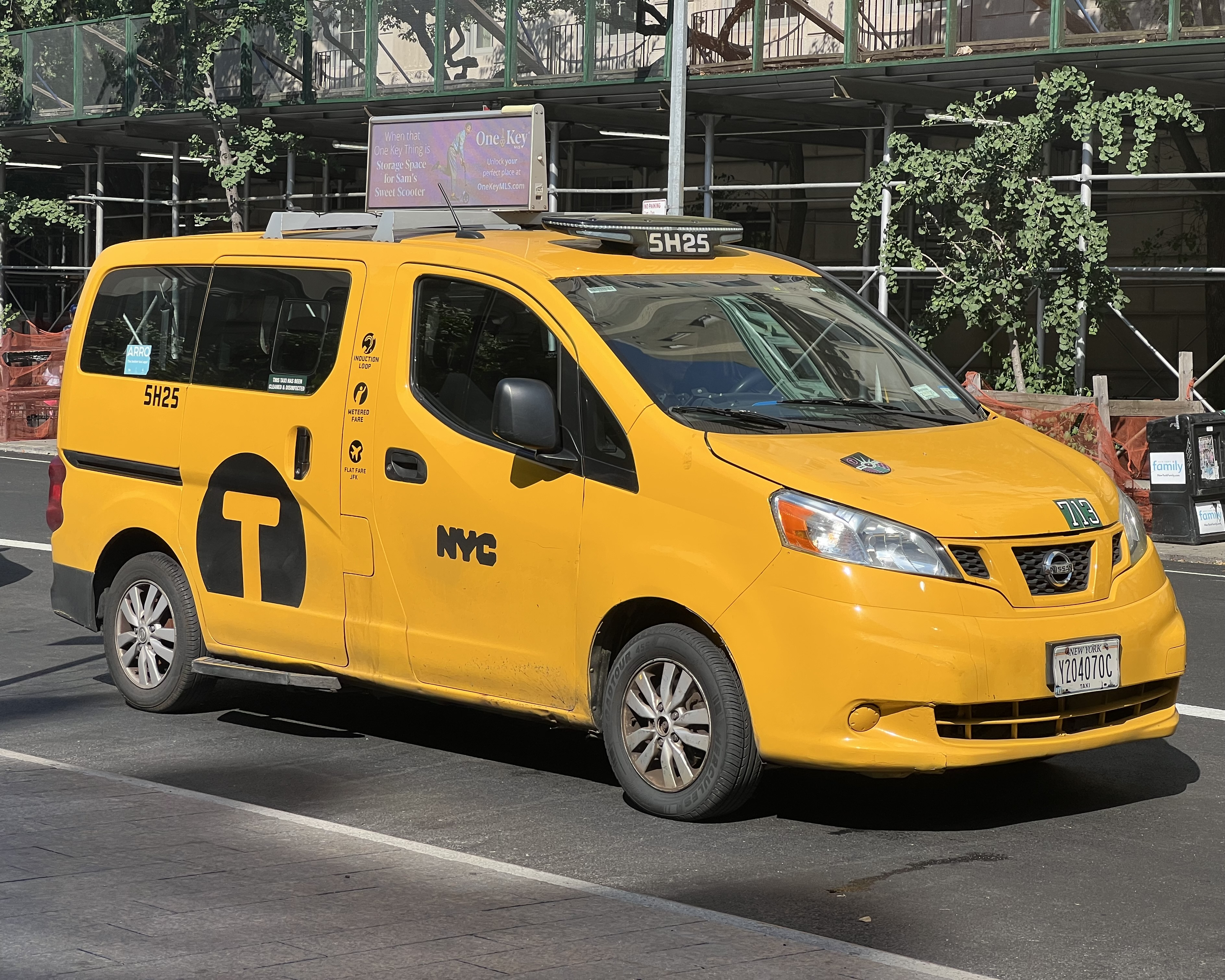
Nissan NV200 New York taxicab

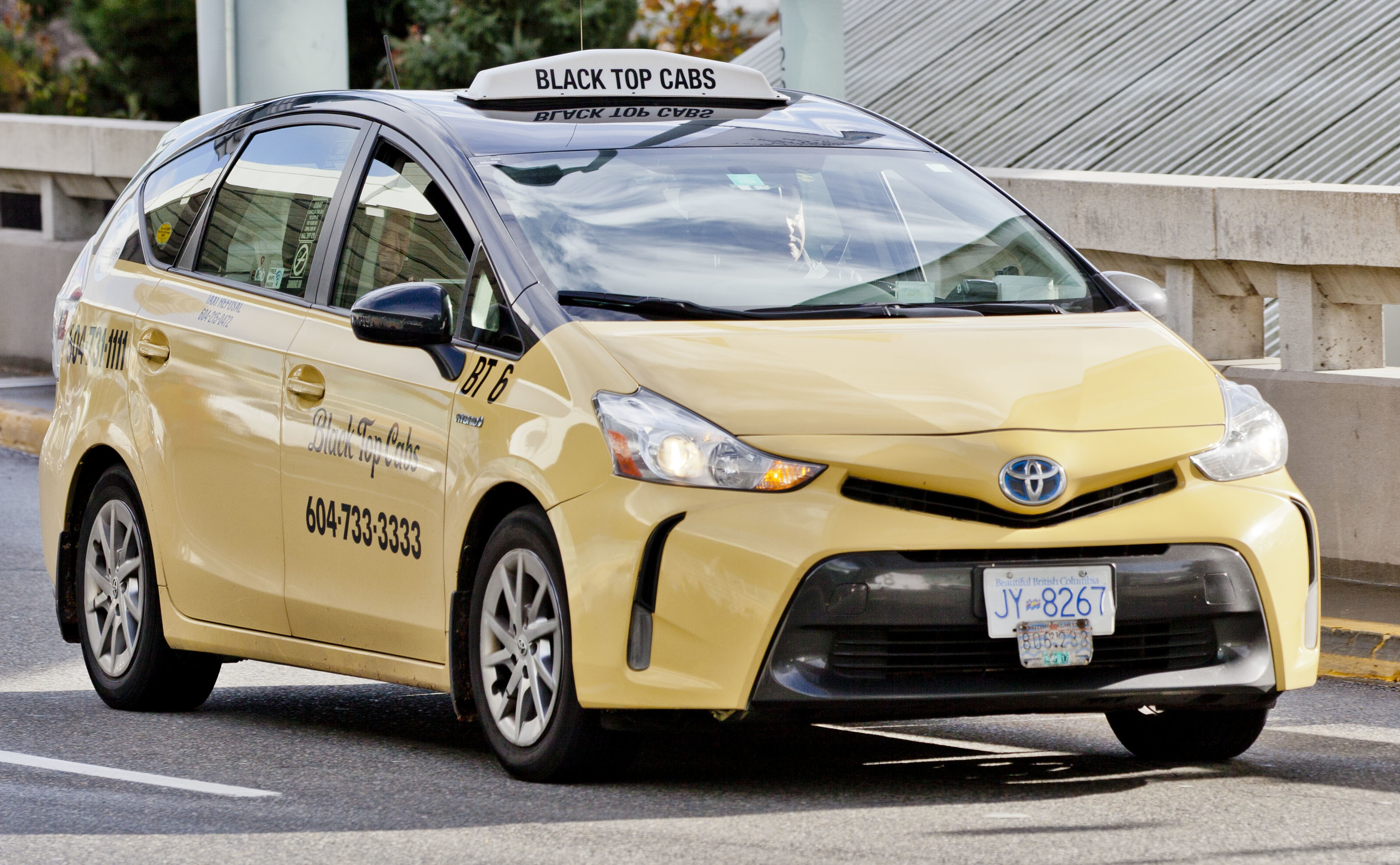
Toyota Prius V in Vancouver, British Columbia

Throughout the United States (and Canada) there is a mature system of taxicabs. Most U.S. and Canadian cities have a licensing scheme that restricts the number of taxicabs allowed. These are sometimes called medallions or CPNC (Certificate of Public Necessity and Convenience).

Often taxi businesses own their own cars, and the drivers are hired by the company as independent contractors. However, cabs can also be owned by separately incorporated small businesses that subscribe to a dispatch service, in which case the company logo on the door is that of the dispatch association.

A suburban taxi company may operate under several different names serving several adjacent towns. They often provide different phone numbers for each fleet, but they usually all ring into a central dispatch office. They may have subsidiary taxi businesses holding medallions in each town.

Taxi companies also may run multiple businesses, such as non-medallion car services, delivery services, and school buses, for additional revenue, as the infrastructure required for maintaining, operating, and dispatching the fleet can be shared. Sometimes theme or entertainment-based taxis, like Funkmaster V's Uptown Cabs of Renown or Karaoke Kab, are popular taxi services in the United States.

== Oceania ==
=== Australia ===
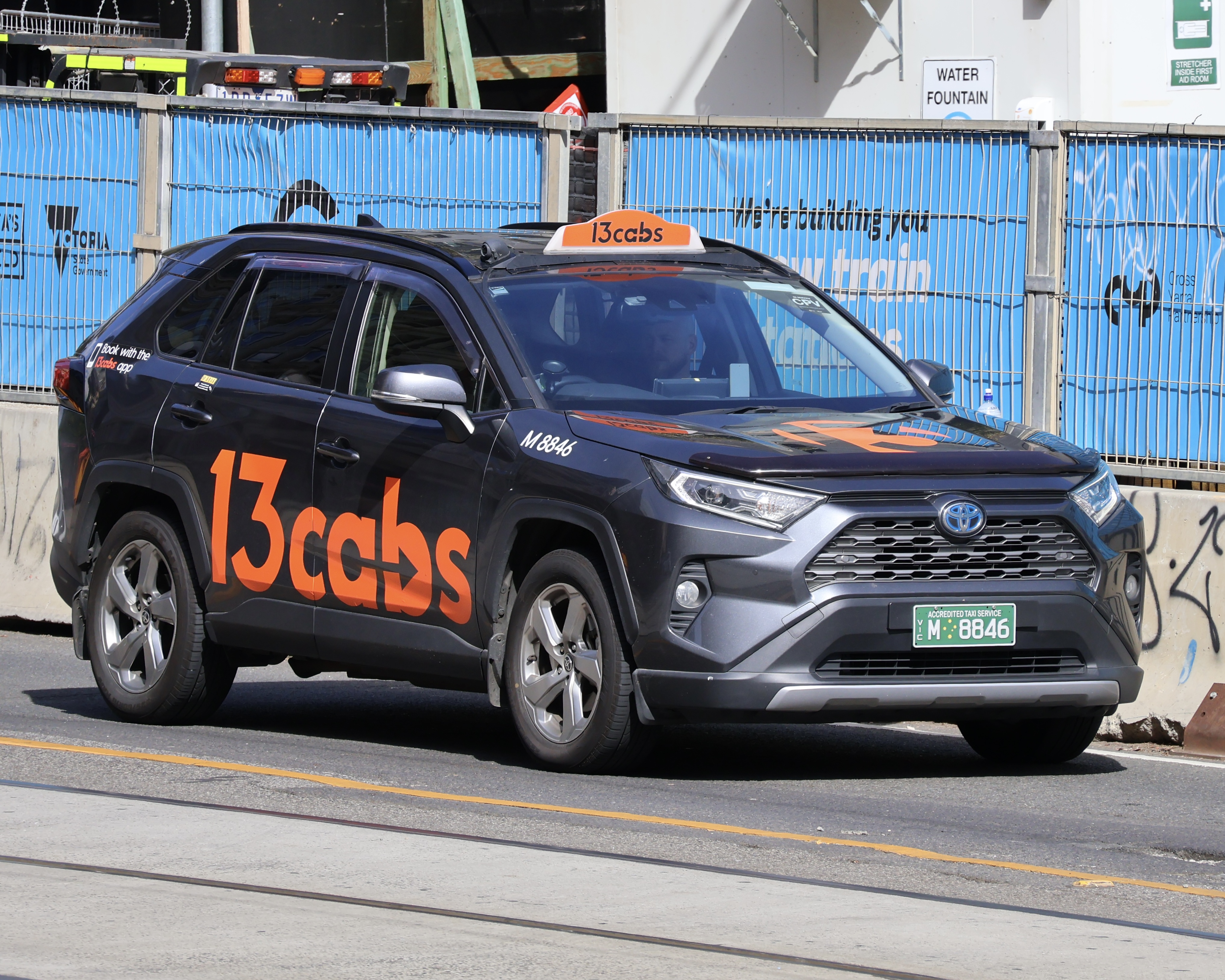
Toyota RAV4 taxi in Melbourne, Victoria

Australia used horse-drawn taxis once cities were established (as had been used in Europe in the early 19th century). Motor vehicle taxis were introduced into Australia not long after they were put into service in the United Kingdom and Europe. In 1906, Sydney inaugurated motorised taxis and in approximately 1907 so did Queensland, and other states followed soon after.

The progress through the years included many types of tourers from the 1910 era until the late 1920s, with British and American cars predominating.

Sedans were added during the late 1920s and included similar makes of vehicles. This was the case with all cars being imported into Australia until World War II began. American cars proved more suitable to Australian motoring conditions, especially for taxis. General Motors Corporation built thousands in Australia, as did the other American companies including Ford Motor Company and Chrysler.

=== New Zealand ===
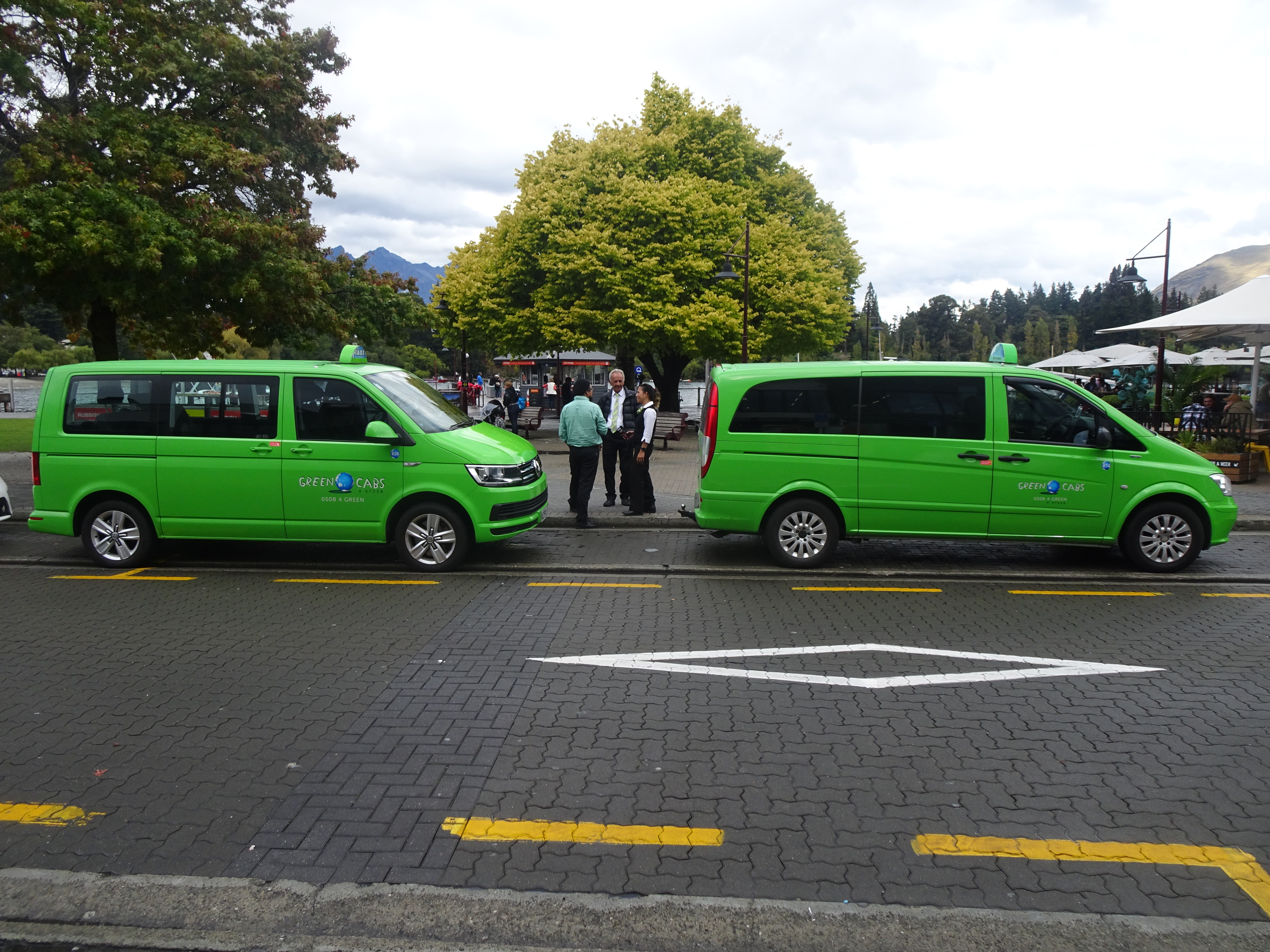
Green Cabs in Queenstown, New Zealand

In New Zealand, as in Australia, Holden Commodores and Ford Falcons were the traditional taxicab of choice. However, in the last decade, large front-wheel drive V6 models such as Toyota Avalons, Nissan Maximas and Toyota Camrys predominated. In the main centres these are now being replaced by lower carbon-emission vehicles, primarily the Toyota Prius and the Toyota Camry Hybrid.

== South America ==
=== Argentina ===
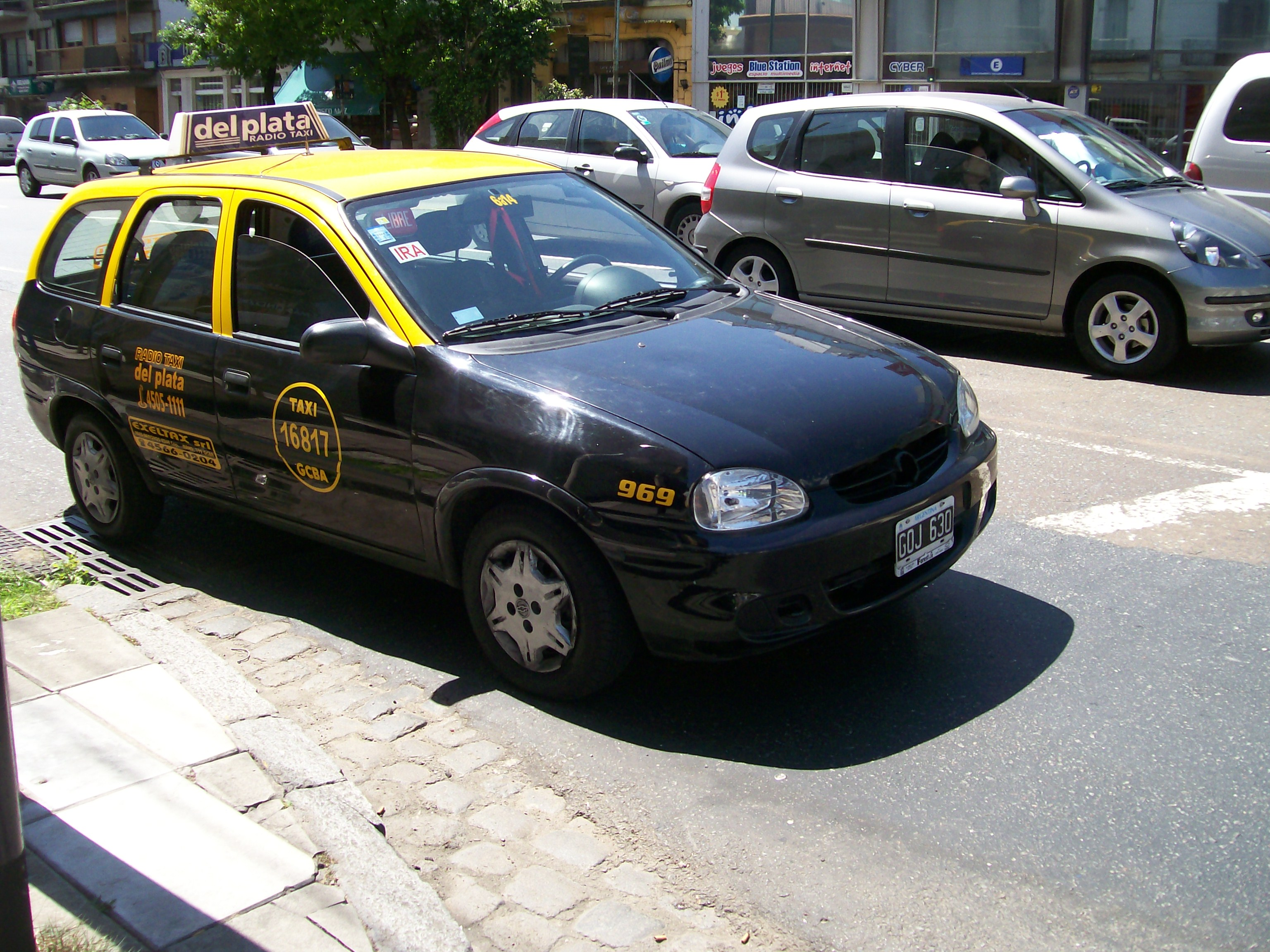
Chevrolet Corsa taxi

In Argentina taxicabs are called taxis. In the capital of Buenos Aires, as well as Rosario and other cities, the taxis are black with yellow roofs. The licensing is a central government function. In the 1980s, many Peugeot 504s using the aforementioned paint scheme served as taxis. Today, most models are Chevrolet Corsa and Fiat Siena, with retrofitted or factory-built NGV engines, which means much lower fuel costs than gasoline.

=== Colombia ===
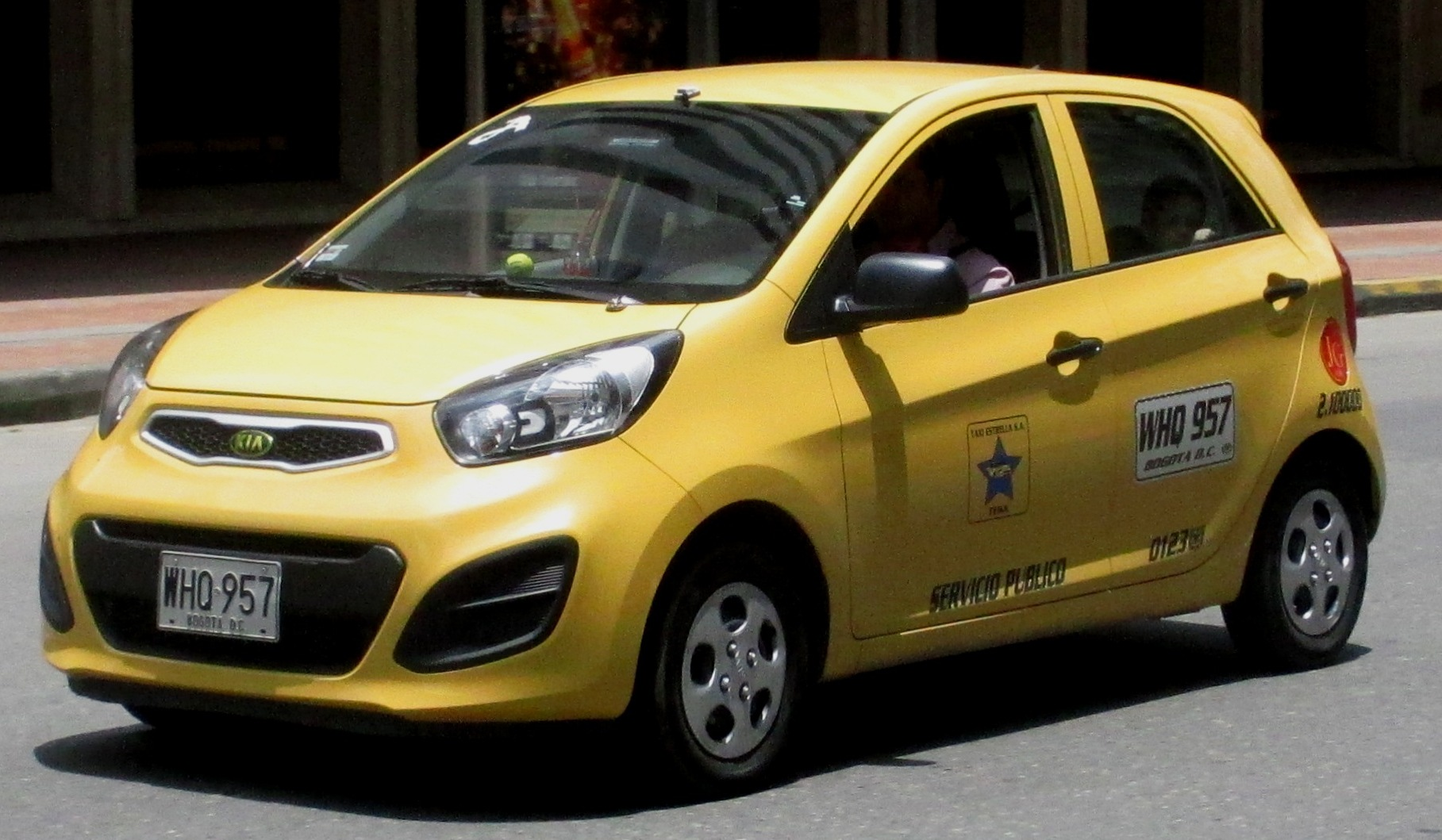
Kia Picanto taxicab in Bogota, Colombia

In Colombia, taxicabs are yellow in most cities. The most common taxicab is the Hyundai Atos, praised for its fuel economy. Other similar, popular taxicab vehicles include the Chevrolet Matiz and the Kia Picanto.

=== Uruguay ===
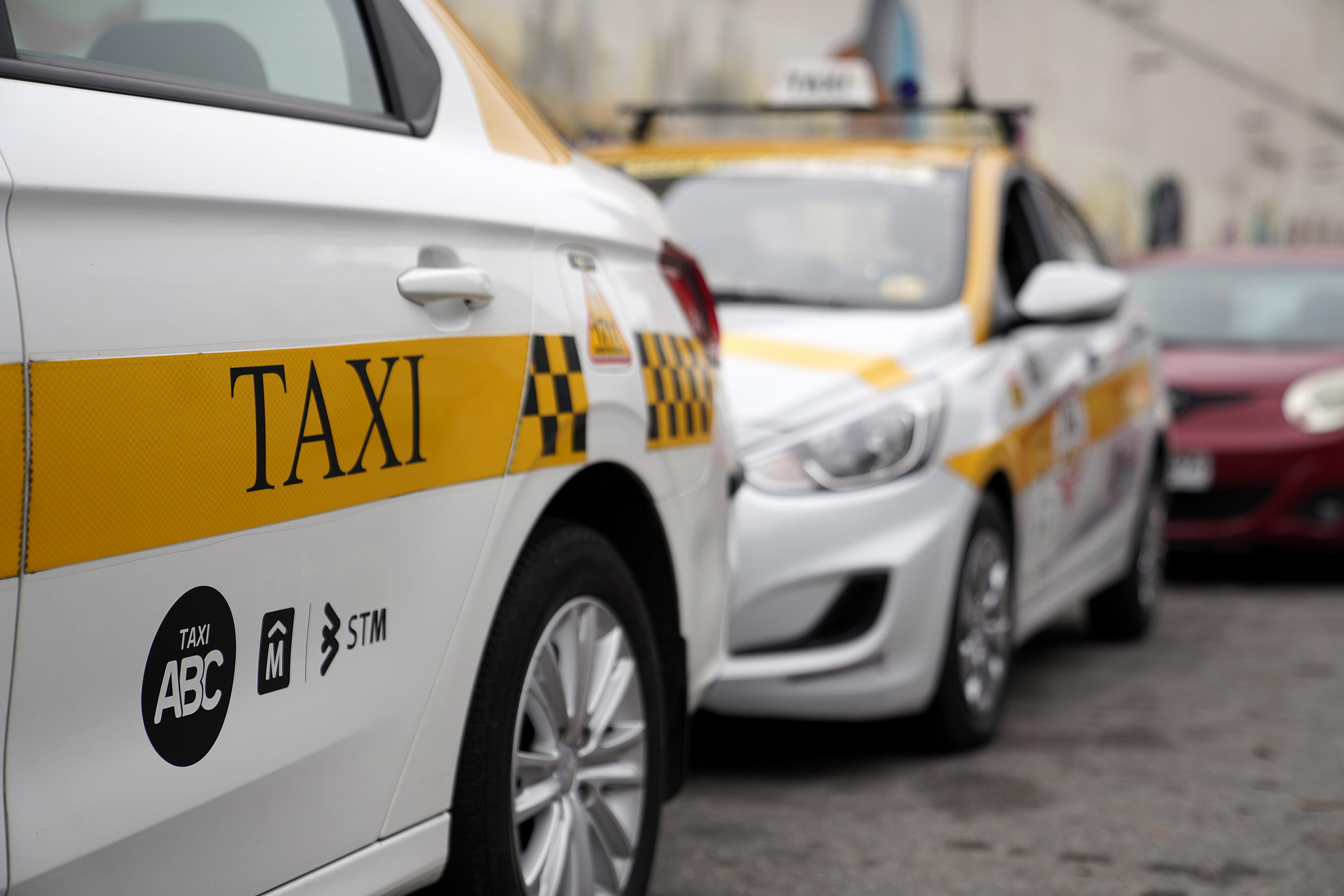
Taxis of Montevideo, Uruguay.

In Uruguay taxicabs are always called taxis and not cabs. In Uruguay's capital, Montevideo, taxis are yellow and white. Licensing is a central government function.

== See also ==
- Livery of taxicabs worldwide
