= Toyota Vios =

Subcompact car

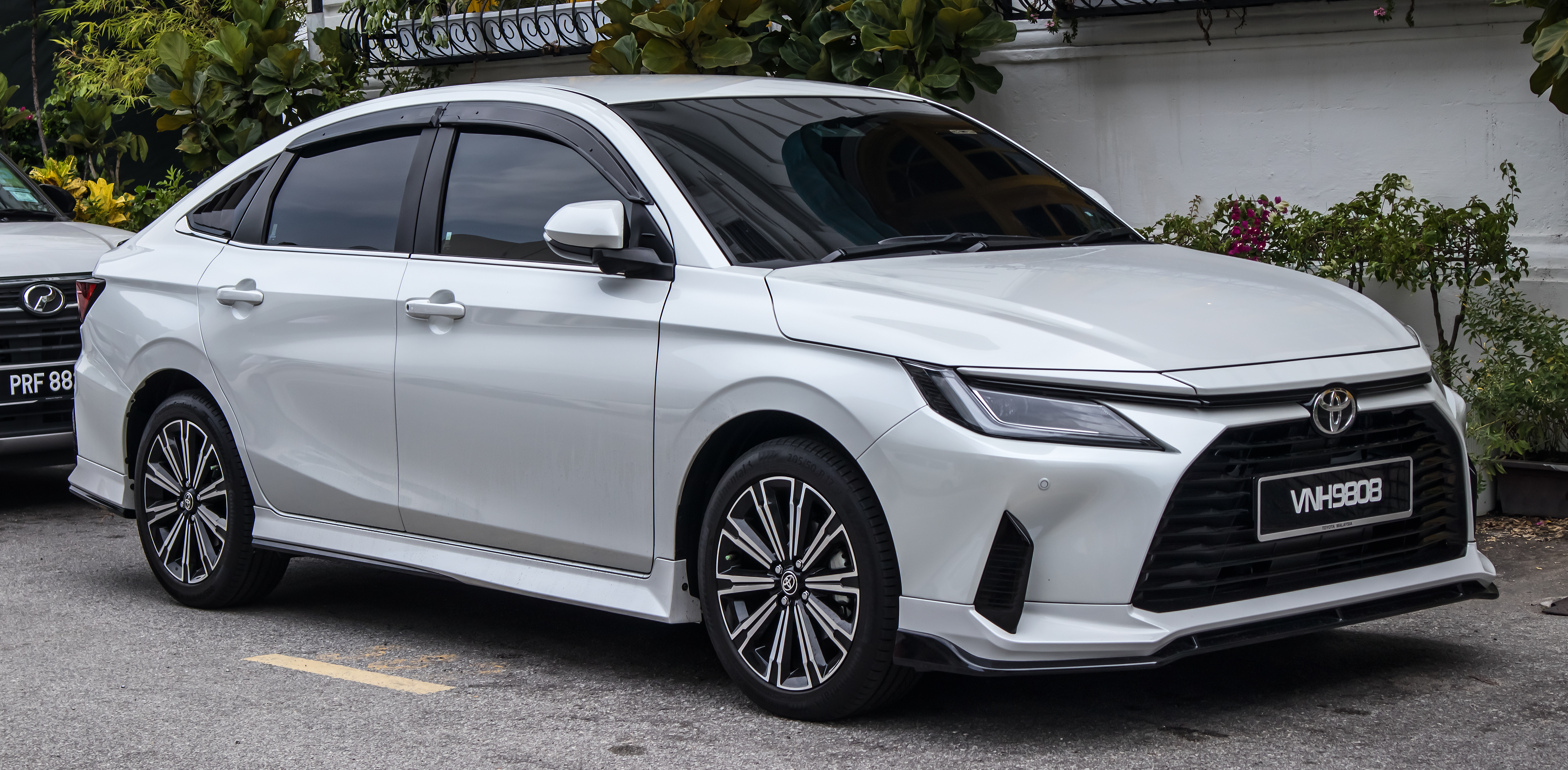
- Toyota Vios 1.5 G (NGC102, Malaysia)

Overview
- Manufacturer: Toyota
- Also called: Toyota Belta (Japan, 2005–2012); Toyota Yaris (2007–present); Toyota Limo (Indonesia, taxi version, 2004–2016)
- Production: October 2002–present

Body and chassis
- Class: Subcompact car (B)
- Body style: 4-door saloon; 5-door hatchback (China, 2016–2023)
- Layout: Front-engine, front-wheel-drive

Chronology
- Predecessor: Toyota Tercel/Soluna; Toyota Corolla (E110) (Philippines and Vietnam)

The Toyota Vios is a nameplate used for subcompact cars produced by the Japanese manufacturer Toyota, primarily for markets in Southeast Asia, China and Taiwan since 2002. Slotted below the compact Corolla, the Vios serves as the replacement to the Tercel (marketed as Soluna in Thailand since 1997 and Indonesia since 2000), which filled the subcompact or B-segment sedan class in the region. It is also successor to the entry-level variants of the E110 series Corolla in some markets such as the Philippines and Vietnam.

From 2005, the Vios was also marketed alongside its hatchback complement known as the Yaris in many countries globally. The second-generation Vios was released in 2007, which was marketed as the Belta in Japan and Toyota Yaris sedan in the Americas, the Middle East and Australia. The second-generation model shares its platform with the XP90 series Vitz/Yaris.

The third-generation Vios was released in 2013, which shares the platform with the XP150 series Yaris hatchback. It is marketed in regions outside Southeast Asia, China and Taiwan as the Yaris sedan. Through a major refresh in 2017, the Vios shares the same styling as the refreshed XP150 series Yaris hatchback. The heavily facelifted model also gained more global presence by local production in Brazil, India and Pakistan as the Yaris sedan. A separate, less major refresh was introduced for the Chinese market Vios in 2016 alongside a hatchback model marketed as the Toyota Vios FS.

In Thailand, the 2017 facelifted model was marketed as the Toyota Yaris Ativ, which shares the smaller 1.2-litre engine with the Yaris hatchback. The 1.5-litre Vios continued to be sold alongside the Yaris Ativ until 2022, using the Chinese market facelift styling.

The fourth-generation model was released in 2022 in Thailand as the Yaris Ativ. It was designed and engineered by Daihatsu using its DNGA platform.

The "Vios" name is derived from the Latin word "vio", meaning "go or travel (forward)", while Toyota marketed the car in Indonesia in 2007 with the backronym "Very Intelligent, Outstanding Sedan". In Indonesia, no-frills base variant of the Vios that cater for taxi fleet was marketed as the Toyota Limo throughout three generations. Toyota Vios is the best-selling car in the Philippines.

The Vios has been campaigned in One Make Races in Malaysia, Philippines and Thailand.

== First generation (XP40; 2002) ==
First generation
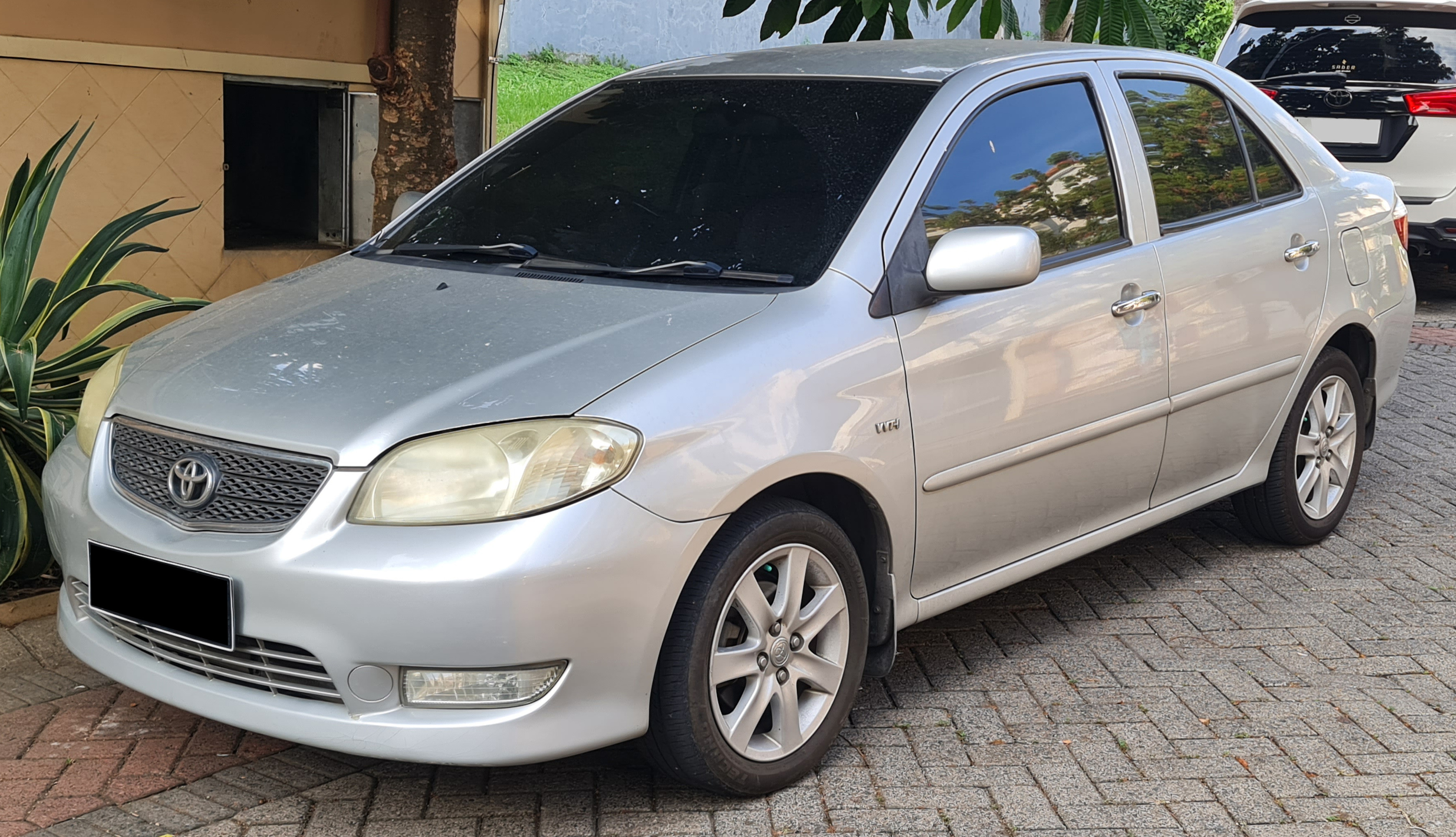
- 2005 Toyota Vios 1.5 G (NCP42; pre-facelift, Indonesia)

Overview
- Model code: XP40
- Also called: Toyota Soluna Vios (Thailand, 2002–2004); Toyota Limo (Indonesia, taxi version)
- Production: October 2002 – April 2007; 2003–2014 (Taiwan)
- Assembly: China: Tianjin (TFTM); Malaysia: Shah Alam, Selangor; Taiwan: Zhongli (Kuozui Motors); Thailand: Chachoengsao (TMT); Vietnam: Phúc Yên (TMV)
- Designer: Issei Otsubo, Takeo Sowa and Yoshihide Aoyama (facelift)

Body and chassis
- Body style: 4-door saloon
- Platform: Toyota NBC platform
- Related: Toyota Platz/Yaris/Echo sedan (XP10)

Powertrain
- Engine: Petrol: 1.3 L 8A-FE I4 (China); 1.3 L 2SZ-FE I4 (China); 1.3 L 2NZ-FE I4 (Philippines); 1.5 L 5A-FE I4 (China); 1.5 L 3SZ-VE I4 (China); 1.5 L 1NZ-FE I4; 1.5 L 1NZ-FE Turbo I4-T (Thailand)
- Transmission: 5-speed manual; 4-speed automatic

Dimensions
- Wheelbase: 2,500 mm (98.4 in)
- Length: 4,285 mm (168.7 in)
- Width: 1,695 mm (66.7 in)
- Height: 1,435 mm (56.5 in)
- Kerb weight: 940–990 kg (2,072–2,183 lb)

The first-generation Vios, codenamed XP40, was first previewed as a prototype model called the Toyota T-1, which was showcased in Beijing during Auto China 2002 in June. It is based on the Echo, which was sold in China as the Xiali 2000. Toyota mentioned that the T-1 has a drag coefficient of Cd=0.29.

In October 2002, the XP40 series Vios was started to be assembled in China by Tianjin FAW Toyota. It was also produced at Thailand's Toyota Gateway Plant in Gateway City, Amphoe Plaeng Yao, Chachoengsao Province, as part of a cooperative project between Thai engineers and Toyota's Japanese designers.

The Vios was adapted from the Platz with modified body panels and portions of the car feature design cues from the E120 series Corolla. Like the Vitz and Platz, the Vios features instrument panel mounted on the top center of the dashboard.

In Thailand, Sri Lanka, Indonesia, Singapore, Brunei, Malaysia and Taiwan, the Vios is equipped with a 1.5 L 1NZ-FE engine with VVT-i. Both the 1.5 L 1NZ-FE engine and the smaller 1.3 L 2NZ-FE engine is offered in the Philippines. In China, the Vios (Chinese: 威驰; pinyin: Wēichí) comes with the 1.3 L 8A-FE and 1.5 L 5A-FE. Trim levels for Southeast Asian markets include J, E, G and S, while the DLX, GL, GLX and GLXi are offered in China.

In September 2005, the Vios received minor cosmetic changes to its exterior and interior for the 2006 model year. Updates included the front bumper, headlights and tail lights, redesigned alloy rims, speedometer dial design, and added a console box in the interior.

The Vios was campaigned in the Touring Car Championships in Indonesia and One Make Races in Thailand.

Taxicab versions marketed in Indonesia have less equipment and is rebadged as the Limo. This is not to be confused with certain taxis with the same name in Thailand, which use Corollas.

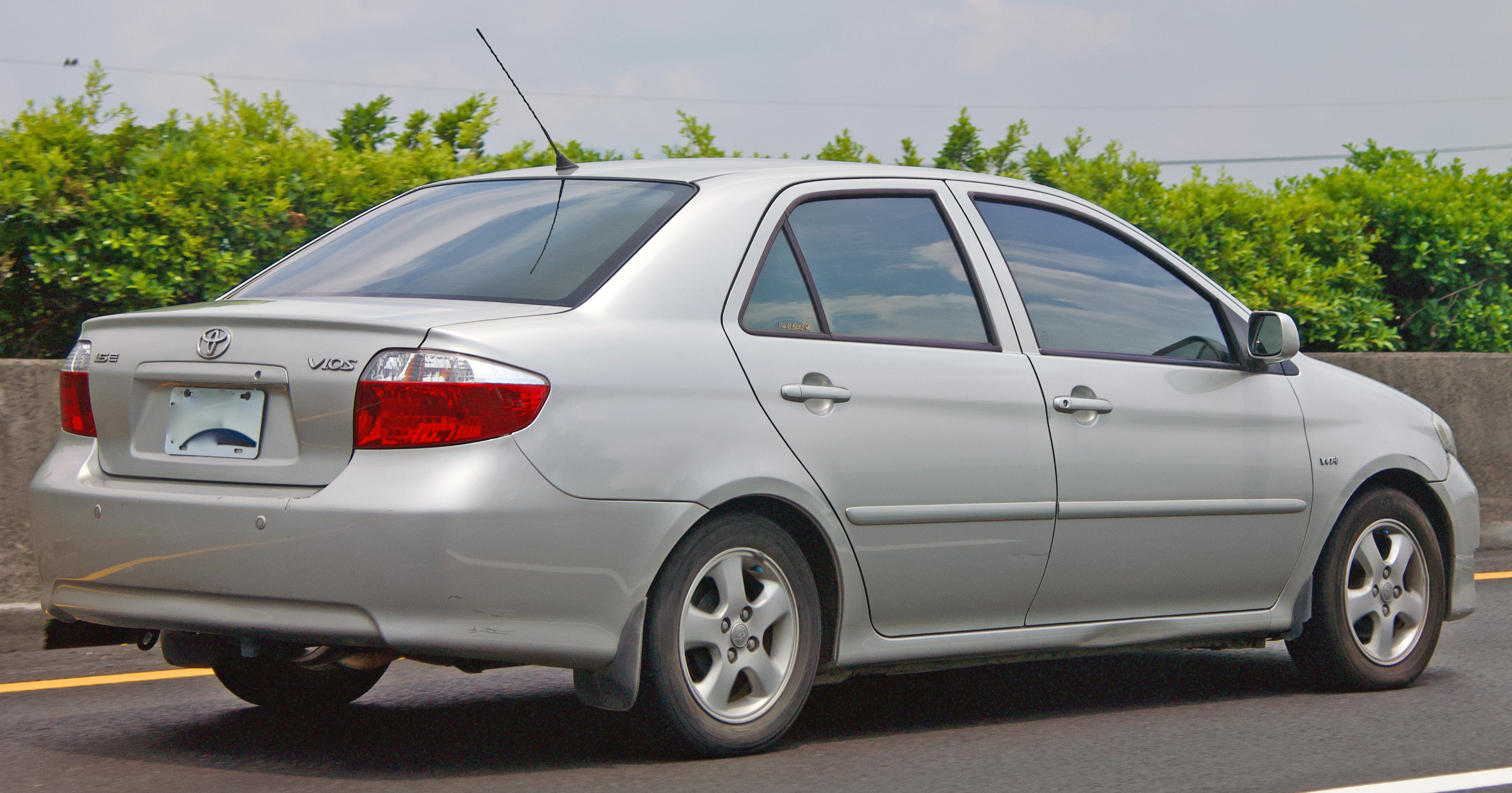
Vios 1.5 E (NCP42; pre-facelift, Taiwan)

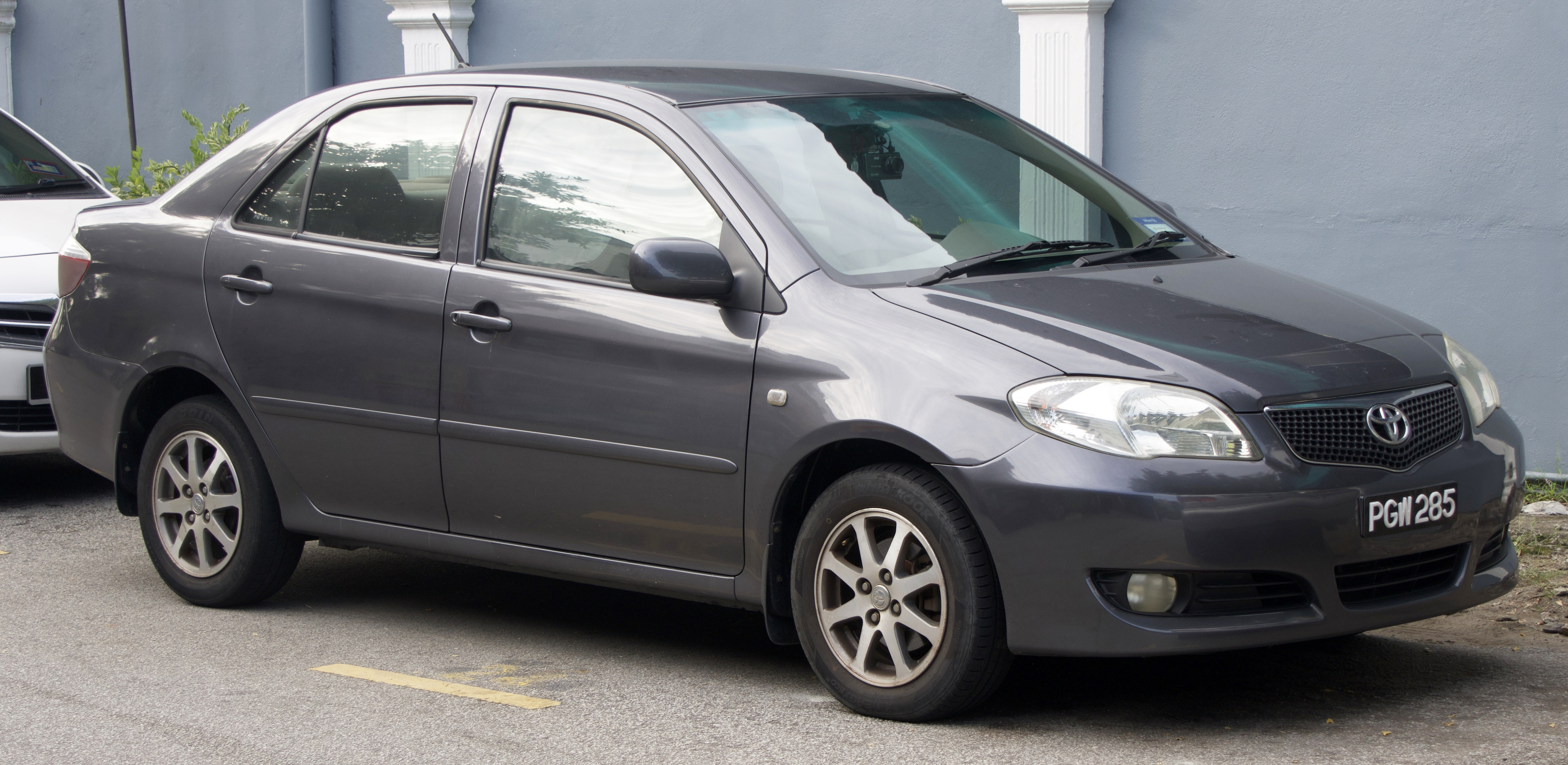
Vios (first facelift, Malaysia)

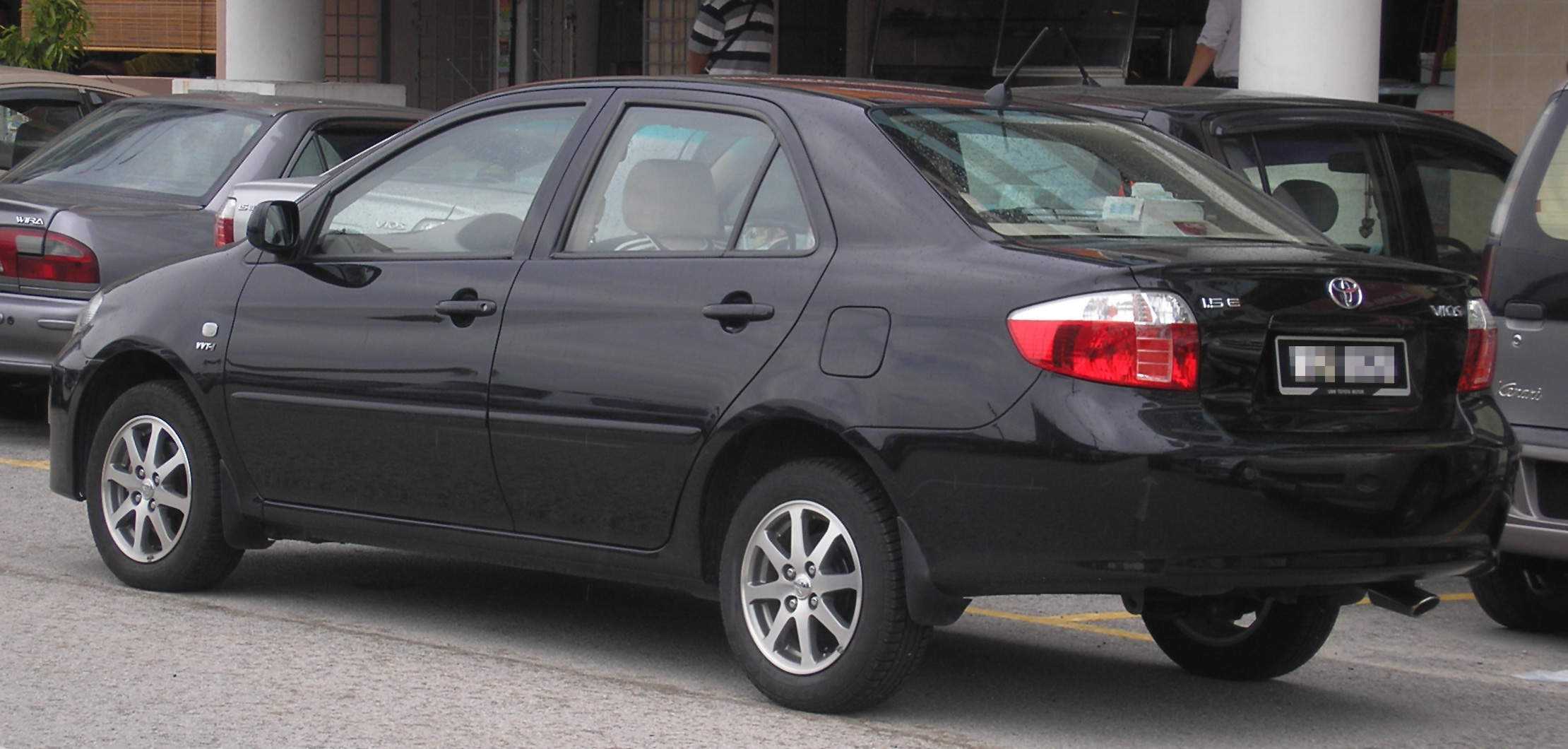
Vios 1.5 E (NCP42; first facelift, Malaysia)

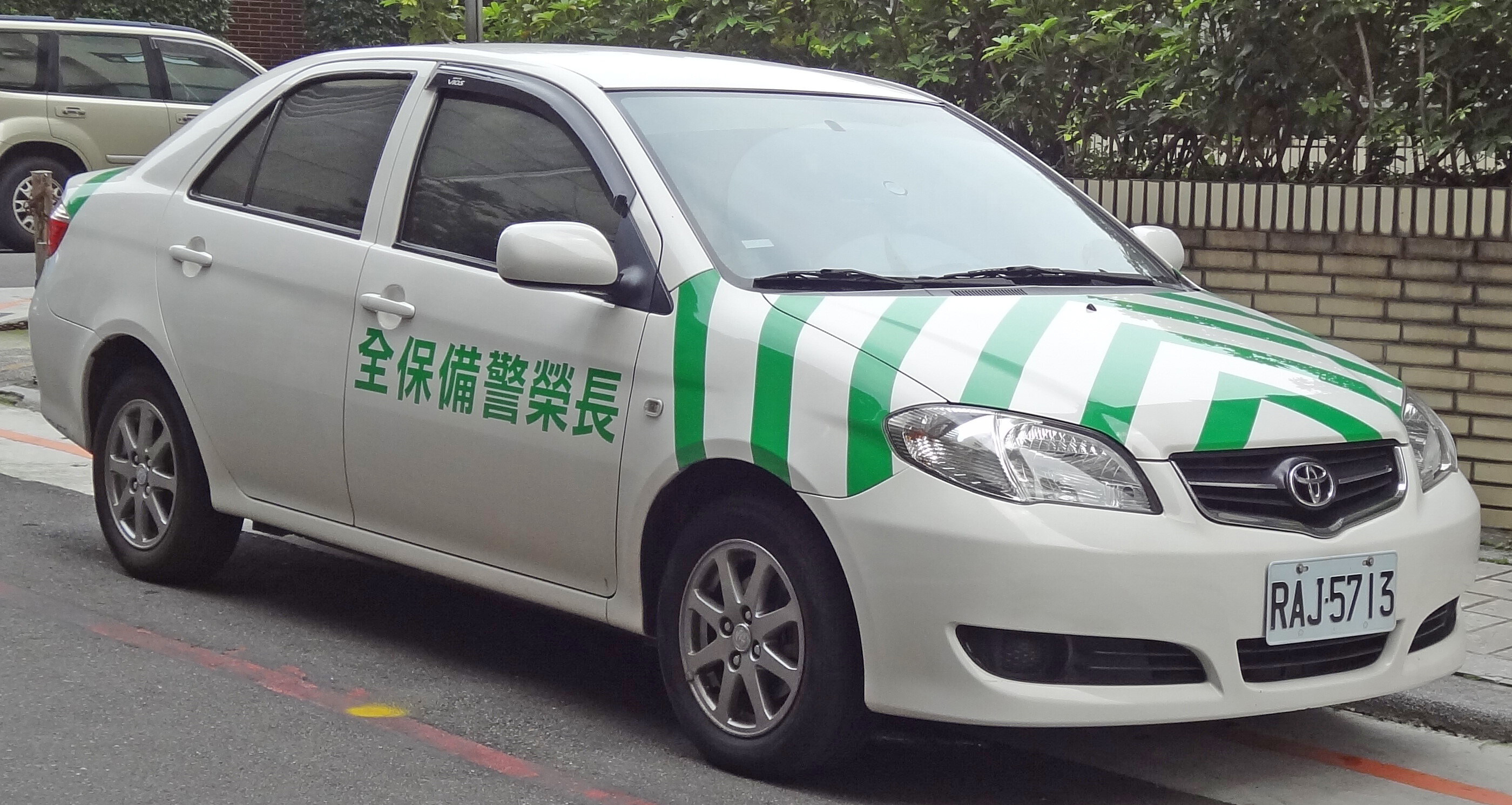
Vios (second facelift, Taiwan)

=== Markets ===
==== China ====
In China, the Vios was produced from 2004 to 2008 equipped with the 1.3 L 8A-FE and 1.5 L 5A-FE engines paired with a 5-speed manual or 4-speed automatic transmission. The 5A-FE engine was replaced by the 2SZ-FE engine and 3SZ-VE engine in 2006. Trim levels consist of the DLX, GL, GLX and GLXi trims.

==== Indonesia ====
The Vios for Indonesia was imported from Thailand, and offered in E and G model grades. The E was only available with 5-speed manual transmission and 14-inch alloy wheels. The G could be purchased either with manual or automatic. ABS, 15-inch alloys, and digital speedometer are only for the G.

==== Malaysia ====
In Malaysia, the Vios was sold in E and G trim levels and comes with 15-inch alloy wheels. The equipment was similar to the Singaporean specs.

==== Philippines ====
In the Philippines, the Vios was introduced in June 2003 with 2 grades; the E and G. The E variant was powered by a 1.3-litre 2NZ-FE VVT-i engine, paired with a 5-speed manual transmission. It came with an analogue gauge cluster and 14-inch 5-spoke alloy wheels. The G variant was powered by a 1.5-litre 1NZ-FE VVT-i engine. Additional features were fog lamps, power side mirrors, Toyota security alarm system and a digital gauge cluster. It was paired to either a 5-speed manual or 4-speed automatic transmissions. The lower variant J came out in June 2004. It had no power features (except for steering) and 13-inch steel wheels. The Vios received a facelift in June 2005 with the same 3 grades. The E and G variants had different design of alloy wheels and all variants have dual SRS airbags. In 2007, an S variant was added to the lineup as the sport version of Vios. It has installed with a sportier body kits and a duck tail spoiler.

==== Singapore ====
In Singapore, the Vios came in E, G, and S trim levels and powered by a 1.5 L 1NZ-FE engine. The top-of-the-line S trim comes with only a 4-speed automatic transmission. It has a digital speedometer, silver steering wheel trims, foldable wing mirrors, foglamps, chrome door handles and boot lid garnish. The E trim was available in either 5-speed manual or 4-speed automatic transmission and has a conventional speedometer.

Released in 2005, the facelift model was offered in E and S trim levels. All models came with all-around disc brakes, ABS with EBD, and dual SRS Airbags.

==== Taiwan ====
In Taiwan, the Vios came with a 1.5 L 1NZ-FE engine in J and E trim levels. The first-generation Vios was sold and produced until the first quarter 2014.

=== Vios Turbo ===
A Turbo variant of the first-generation Vios was made available only in Thailand, which only 600 cars were produced. A turbocharged 1.5 L engine with an air-to-air intercooler produces 143 PS (105 kW; 141 hp) with light boost at 6,400 rpm with 196 N⋅m (145 lb⋅ft) of torque. It can accelerate from 0–100 km/h (62 mph) in 8.1 seconds. About 600 units were produced. Standard on the Vios Turbo are a functional scoop on its bonnet, wrap-around body kits, stiffer springs, firmer shock-absorbers and 16-inch alloy wheels. Colours available were red, black and silver. The transmission ratio and differential ratios were based on that of a MR-S.

=== Powertrain ===
Code	Engine	Power	Torque	Transmission	Market	Year
AXP41	1,342 cc (1.3 L); 8A-FE I4	87 PS (64 kW; 86 hp) at 6,000 rpm	110 N⋅m (81 lb⋅ft; 11 kg⋅m) at 3,200 rpm	5-speed C550 manual 4-speed U540E automatic	China	2002–2006
SCP41	1,298 cc (1.3 L); 2SZ-FE I4	87 PS (64 kW; 86 hp) at 6,000 rpm	116 N⋅m (86 lb⋅ft; 12 kg⋅m) at 4,400 rpm	5-speed C550 manual 4-speed U540E automatic	China	2006–2008
NCP41	1,298 cc (1.3 L); 2NZ-FE I4	86 PS (63 kW; 85 hp) at 6,000 rpm	122 N⋅m (90 lb⋅ft; 12 kg⋅m) at 4,400 rpm	5-speed C154 manual	Philippines	2003–2007
AXP42	1,498 cc (1.5 L); 5A-FE I4	92 PS (68 kW; 91 hp) at 6,000 rpm	124 N⋅m (91 lb⋅ft; 13 kg⋅m) at 3,200 rpm	5-speed C550 manual 4-speed U540E automatic	China	2002–2006
SCP42	1,495 cc (1.5 L); 3SZ-VE I4	102 PS (75 kW; 101 hp) at 6,000 rpm	130 N⋅m (96 lb⋅ft; 13 kg⋅m) at 4,400 rpm	5-speed C550 manual 4-speed U540E automatic	China	2006–2008
NCP42	1,497 cc (1.5 L); 1NZ-FE I4	109 PS (80 kW; 108 hp) at 6,000 rpm	142 N⋅m (105 lb⋅ft; 14 kg⋅m) at 4,200 rpm	5-speed C150 manual 4-speed U340E automatic	Southeast Asia and Taiwan	2002–2007 (up to 2014 in Taiwan)
NCP42	1,498 cc (1.5 L); 1NZ-FE Turbo I4	143 PS (105 kW; 141 hp) at 6,400 rpm	196 N⋅m (145 lb⋅ft; 20 kg⋅m) at 4,800 rpm	5-speed C56 manual	Thailand	2005

== Second generation (XP90; 2007) ==
Second generation
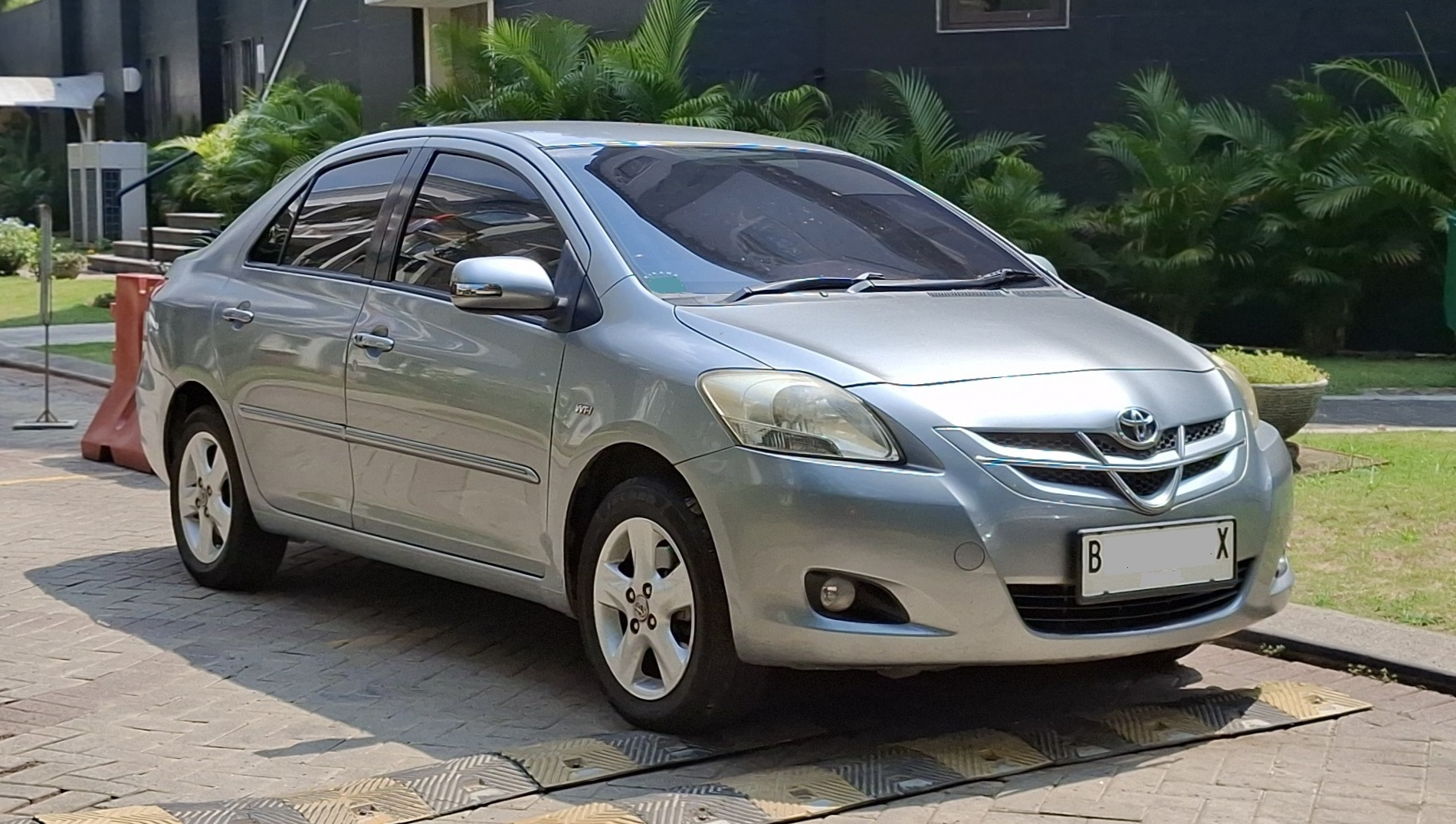
- 2008 Toyota Vios G (pre-facelift, NCP93, Indonesia)

Overview
- Model code: XP90
- Also called: Toyota Yaris; Toyota Belta (Japan); Toyota Limo (taxi version, Indonesia)
- Production: April 2007 – March 2013

Body and chassis
- Body style: 4-door sedan

The second-generation Vios is a renamed Japanese market Belta sedan with varying trim levels and equipment sold in Southeast Asian countries and China between April 2007 and March 2013. It was also sold as the Yaris sedan in North and Latin America, and Australia. The model received a facelift in mid-2010 and the second time in 2012.

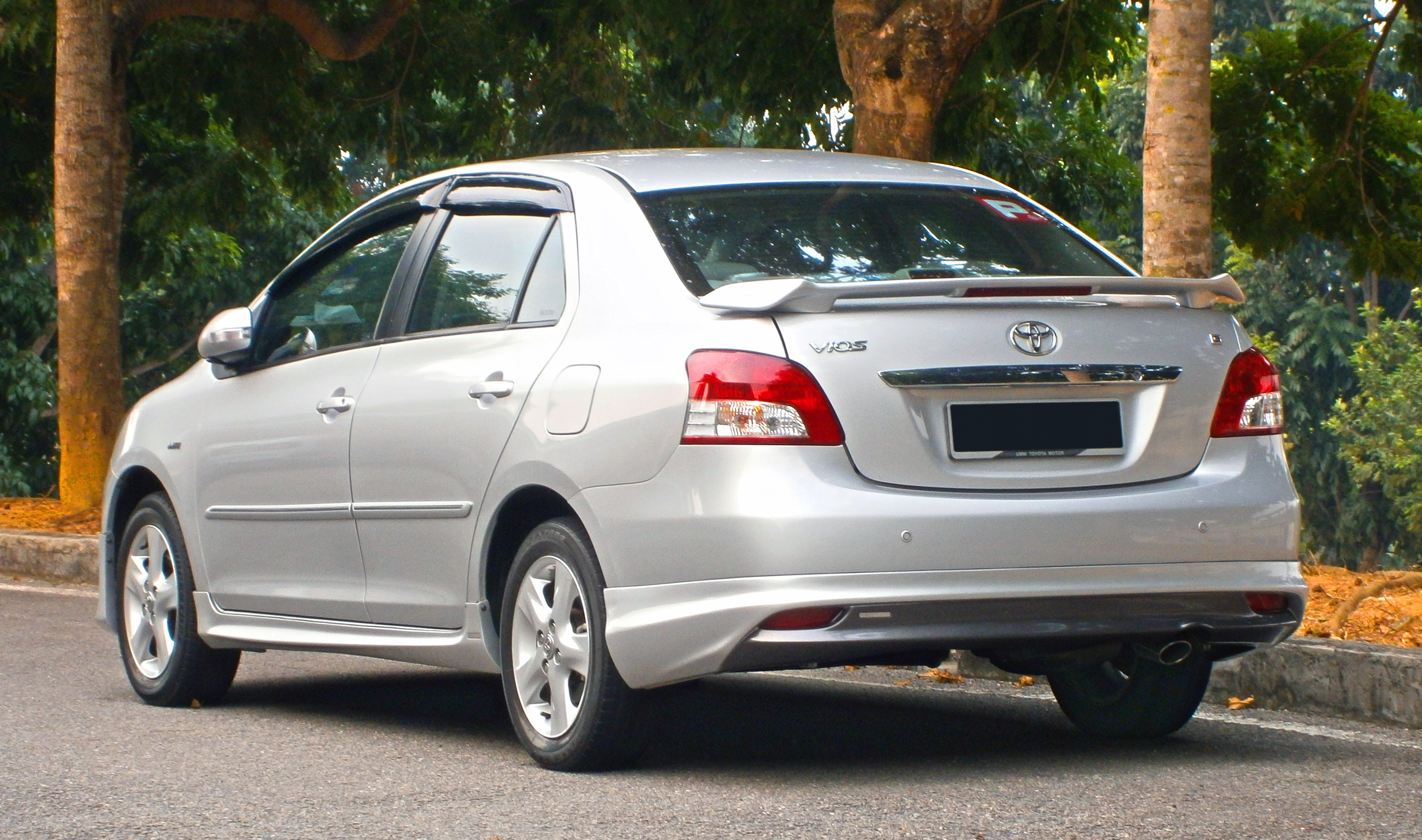
Rear view (pre-facelift) Vios G with optional TRD Sportivo body kit (NCP93, Malaysia)

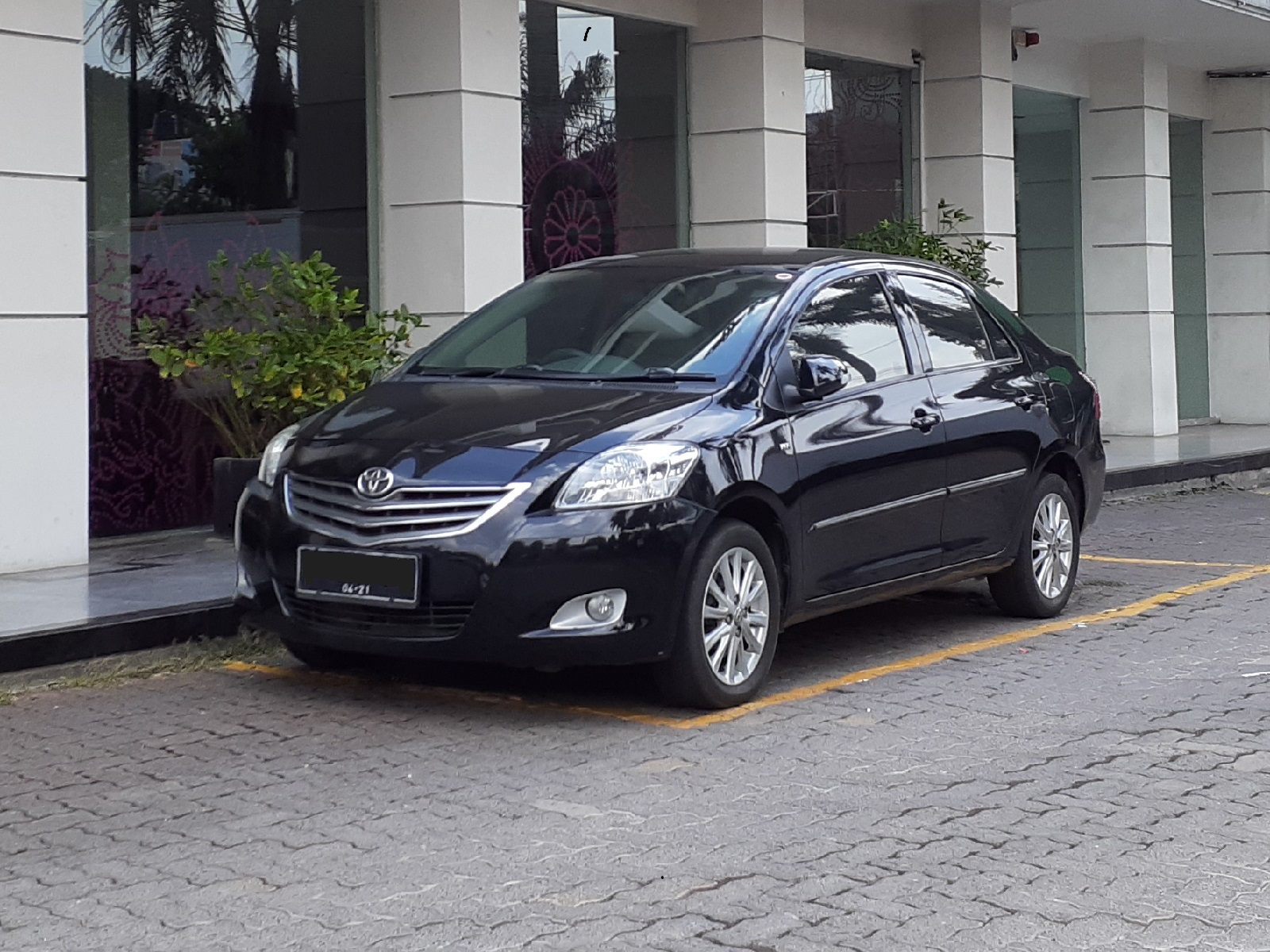
2011 Vios G (facelift, NCP93)

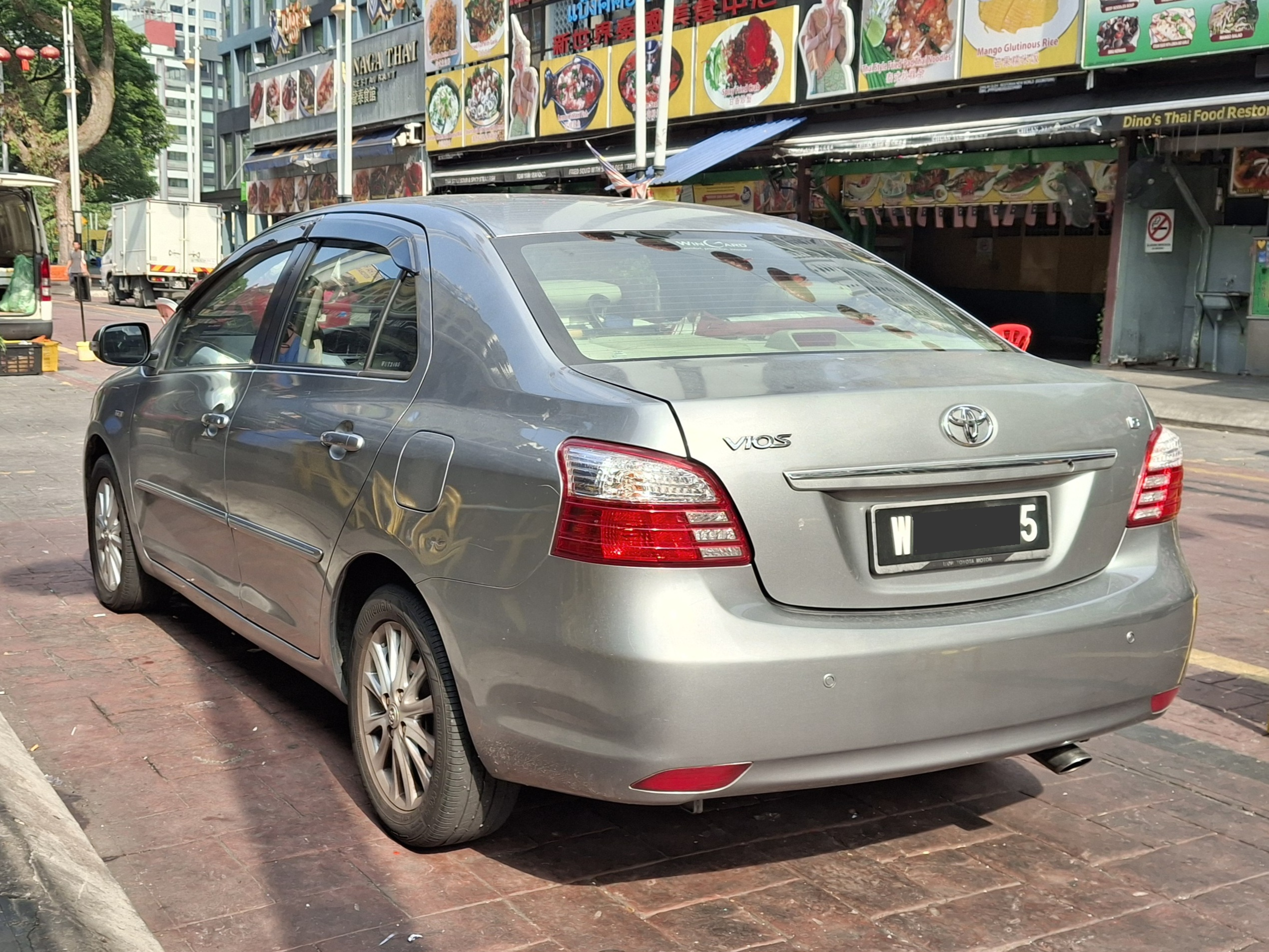
Facelift Vios G (NCP93, Malaysia)

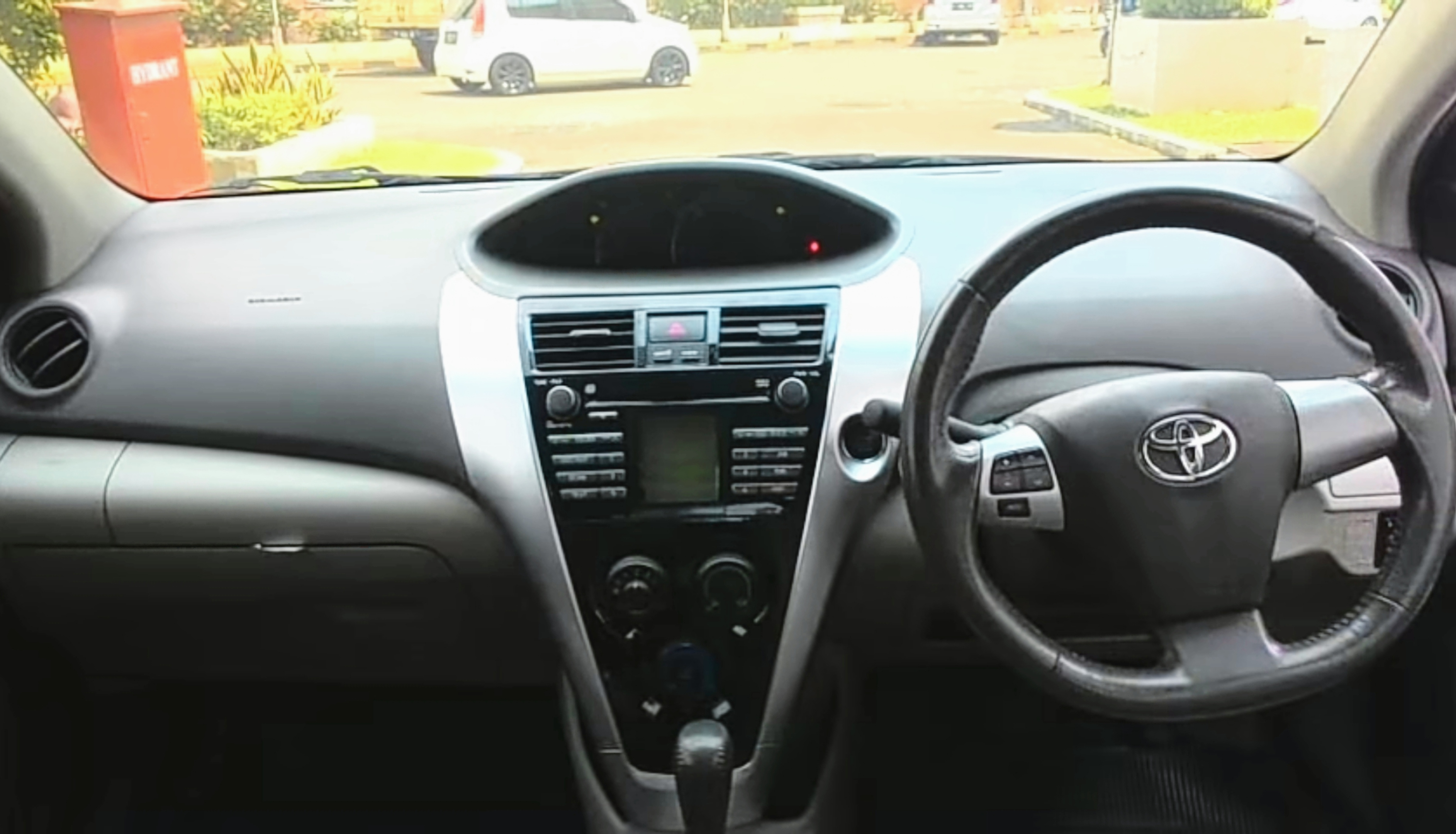
Interior (pre-facelift)

== Third generation (XP150; 2013) ==
Third generation
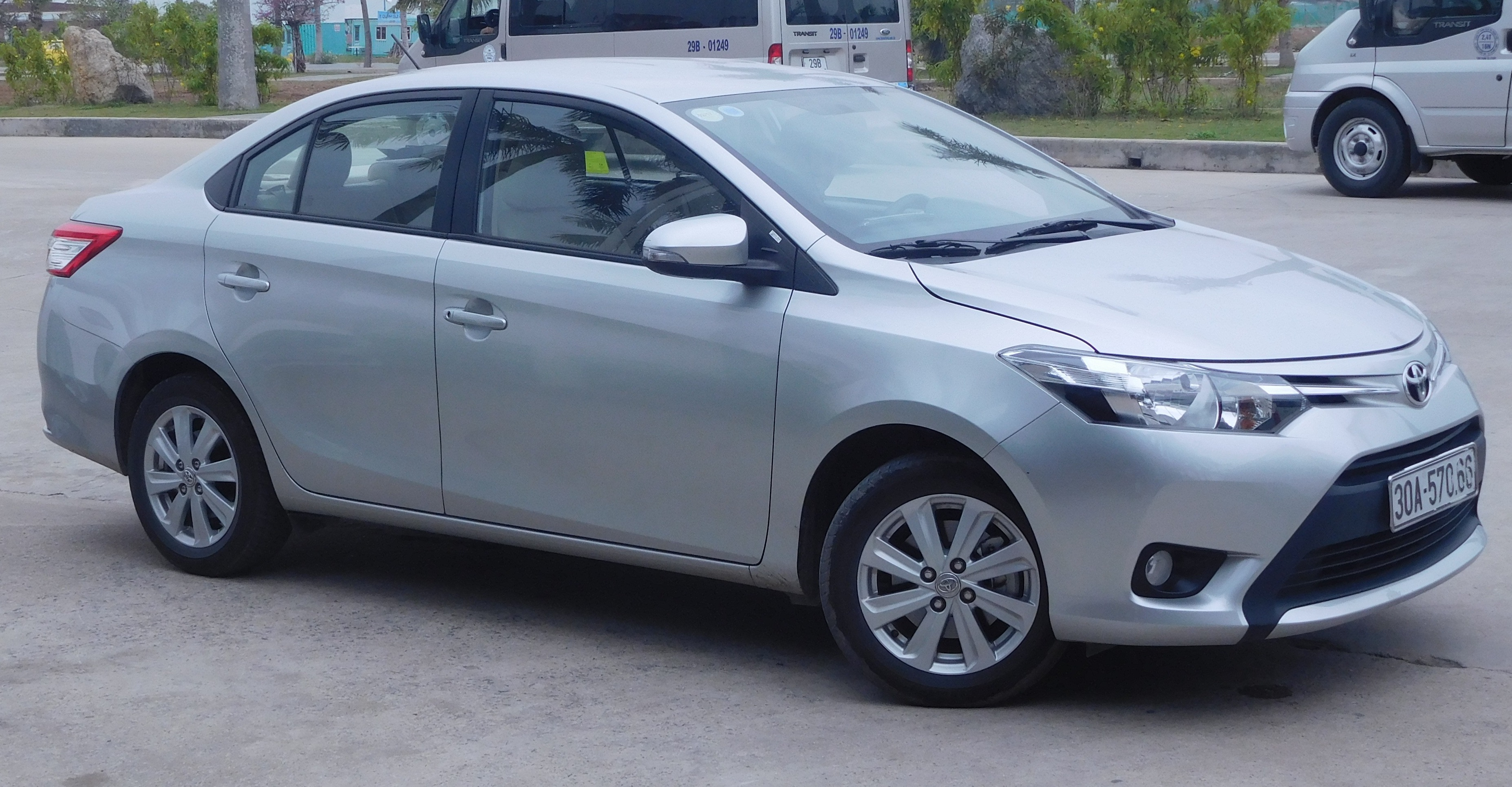
- Pre-facelift Toyota Vios 1.5 E (NCP150, Vietnam)

Overview
- Model code: XP150
- Also called: Toyota Yaris sedan (Latin America, Middle East, Pakistan, India); Toyota Yaris Ativ (Thailand, Pakistan, Sri Lanka; 2017–2022); Toyota Yaris L sedan (China, GAC Toyota); Toyota Limo (Indonesia, taxi version)
- Production: March 2013 – present; 2013–2023 (China, Malaysia, Thailand); 2018–2021 (India); 2013–2022 (Indonesia); 2013–present (Philippines, Vietnam); 2014–present (Taiwan); 2020–present (Pakistan)
- Assembly: China: Tianjin (TFTM); India: Bidadi, Karnataka (TKM); Indonesia: Karawang (TMMIN); Malaysia: Shah Alam, Selangor Bukit Raja; Pakistan: Karachi (Toyota Indus); Philippines: Santa Rosa (TMP); Thailand: Chachoengsao (TMT); Taiwan: Guanyin (Kuozui Motors); Vietnam: Phúc Yên (TMV)
- Designer: Hideyuki Numata, Hiroaki Suzuki, Kazuhiko Isawa and Makoto Takahashi; Yukihiro Koide and Takuya Watabe (2018 facelift); Hisatoshi Katsukawa and Yoshikazu Shoji (2020 facelift); Jing-qi Zhao and Yun Yang (Chinese market Vios, 2020 facelift)

Body and chassis
- Body style: 4-door saloon; 5-door hatchback
- Platform: Toyota new EFC platform

Powertrain
- Engine: Petrol: 1.3 L 2NZ-FE I4 (NCP151); 1.3 L 1NR-FE I4 (NSP150); 1.3 L 4NR-FE I4 (NSP150; China); 1.5 L 1NZ-FE I4 (NCP150); 1.5 L 2NR-FE I4 (NSP151; 2016–present); 1.5 L 2NR-FBE I4 (NSP151; Thailand); 1.5 L 5NR-FE I4 (NSP151; China)
- Transmission: 5 speed manual; 4-speed automatic; 7-speed CVT transmission (2016–present)

Dimensions
- Wheelbase: 2,550 mm (100.4 in)
- Length: 4,410 mm (173.6 in); 4,420–4,440 mm (174.0–174.8 in) (Yaris Ativ-based facelift); 4,467 mm (175.9 in) (Vios GR-S)
- Width: 1,700 mm (66.9 in); 1,730 mm (68.1 in) (Yaris Ativ-based facelift)
- Height: 1,475 mm (58 in)
- Kerb weight: 1,045–1,060 kg (2,304–2,337 lb); 1,075–1,145 kg (2,370–2,524 lb) (Yaris Ativ-based facelift)

The third-generation Vios (designated XP150) for the Asian market was unveiled on 25 March 2013 at the 34th Bangkok International Motor Show in Thailand. Its design was previewed by the Dear Qin sedan concept that was first displayed at the April 2012 Auto China. Toyota aimed to designate the third-generation Vios as a global model, for markets outside of Asia. The car was sold in Thailand shortly after, and from the second quarter in Asia. The exterior was enlarged over the front and rear sections and its styling outline was later followed by the XP150 series Yaris hatchback for the Southeast Asian market. The instrument cluster position is no longer mounted on the centre of the dashboard.

In regions such as South America, the Caribbean and the Middle East, the XP150 series Vios (for global markets) was sold as the Yaris Sedán. It was sold alongside the Mazda2-based Yaris R till 2020.

In South African regions, only the Yaris hatchback was available for the XP150 model.

The XP150 series Vios/Yaris sedan, is not offered in the United States, Canada, Australia and New Zealand. Yaris sedans subsequently sold in North America from 2015 are based on the Mazda2 and produced for Toyota by Mazda with a 5-year tenure lasting till 2020.

In 2017, a facelift model was released, which introduced newer sheet metal, interior design, while sharing the same front styling with the Yaris hatchback. The platform was revised with additional weldings for more rigidity and also with additional emphasis on noise, vibration, and harshness. Based on Toyota's internal estimates, it saw an 11 percent improvement in this sector, with the dashboard alone received 40 percent more sound insulation than before. The facelifted model was marketed in Thailand with the 1.2-litre as the Yaris Ativ to be eligible with the Eco Car program, while the Vios continued to be sold with the Chinese facelift styling and a 1.5-litre engine as a more powerful alternative. However, the Yaris Ativ-based styling was used for most markets instead of the facelifted Vios sold exclusively in China and Thailand.

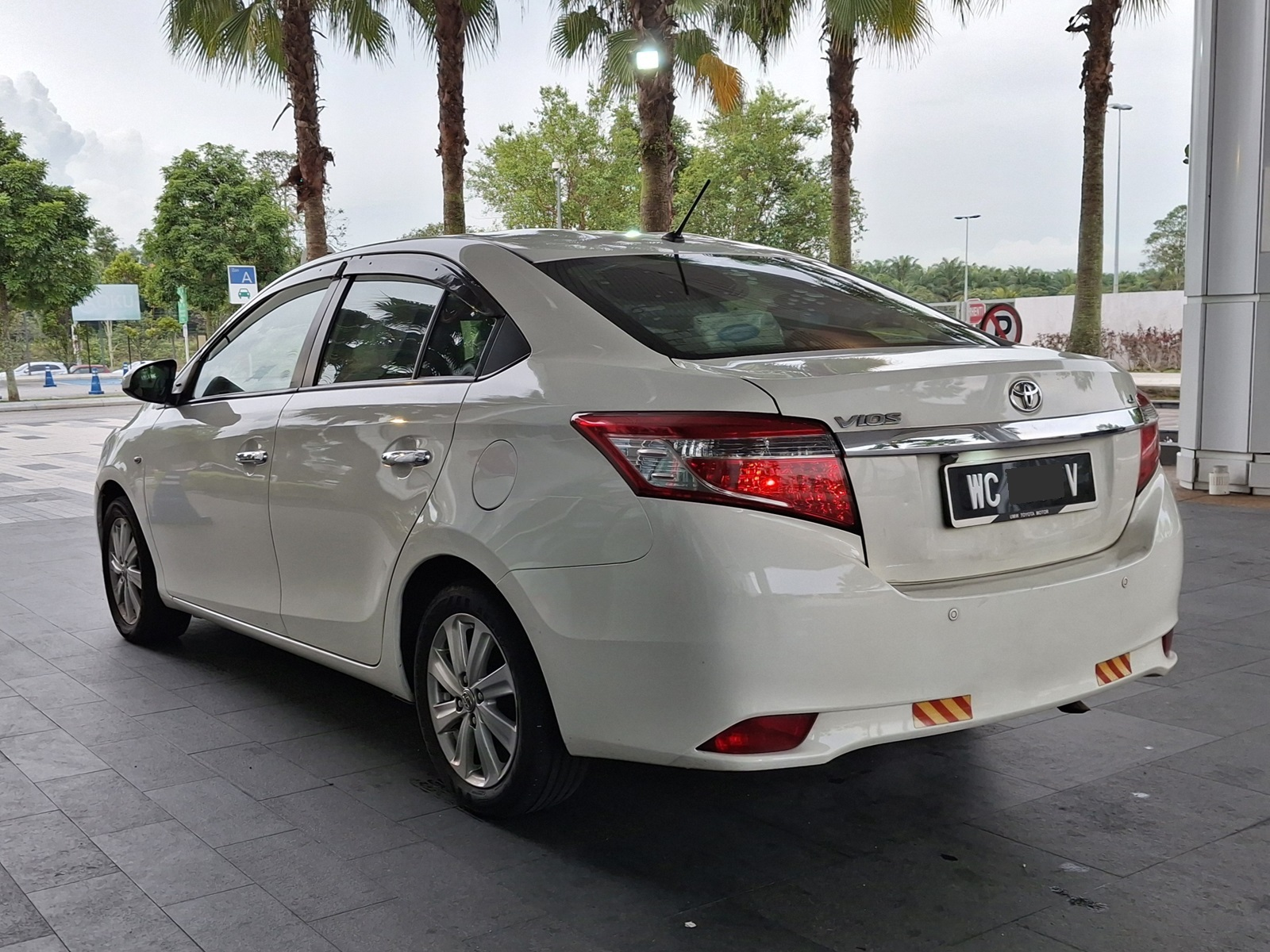
Rear view of Vios 1.5 J (Malaysia, pre-facelift)

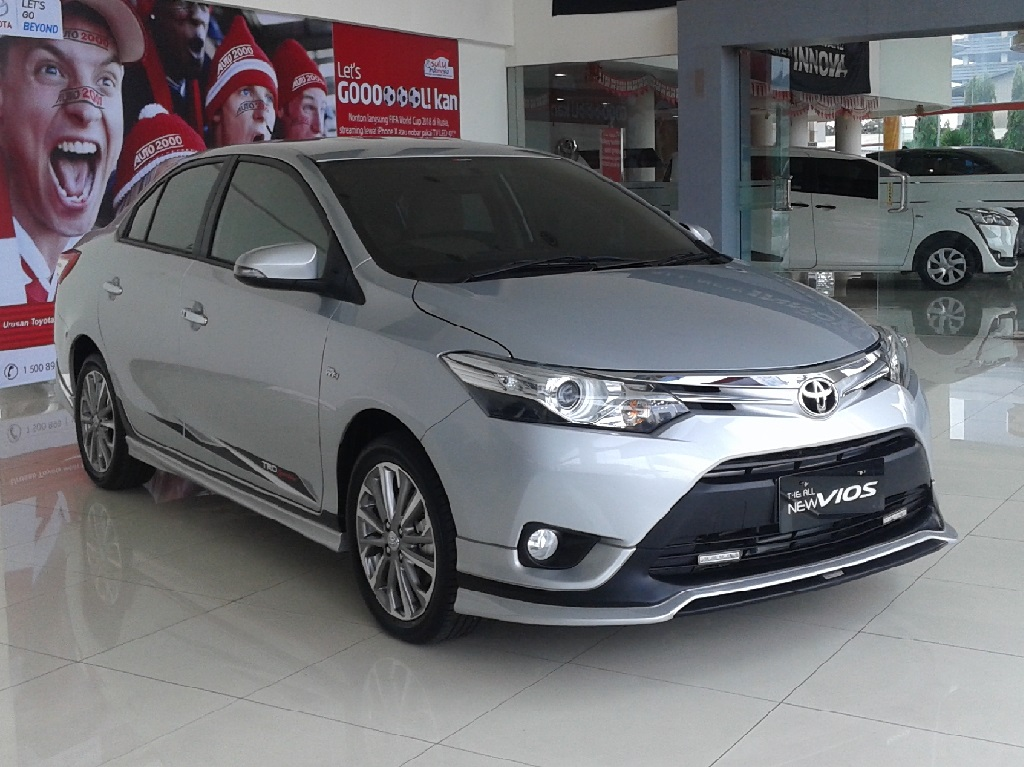
2017 Vios 1.5 TRD Sportivo (Indonesia; pre-facelift)

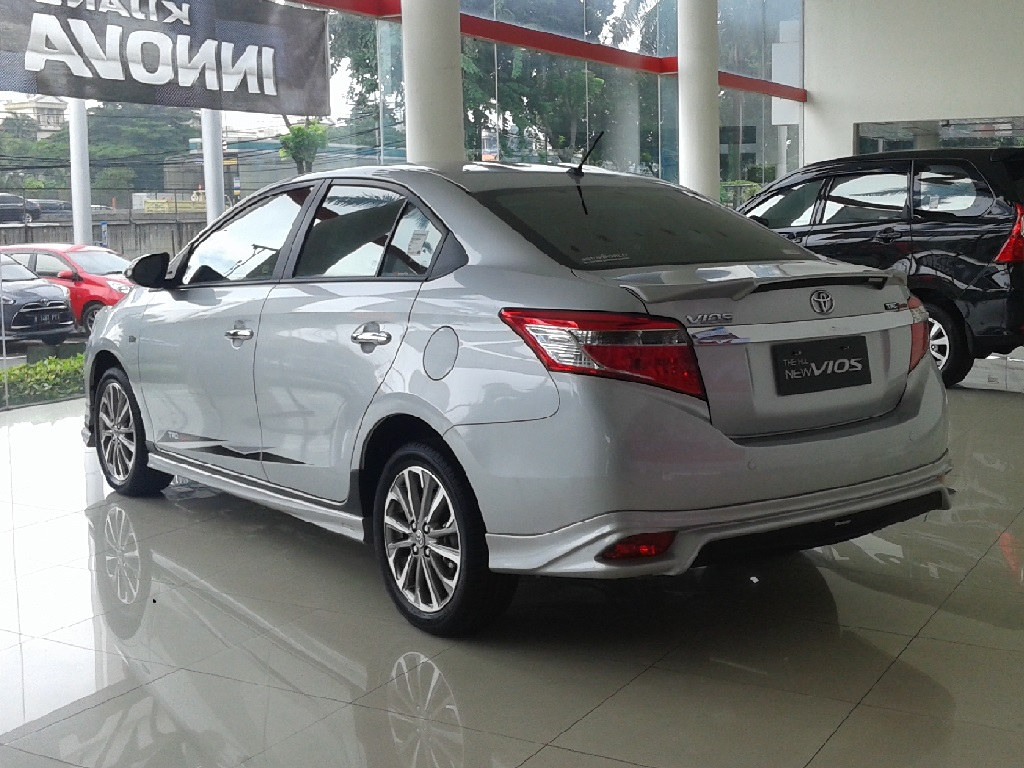
2017 Vios 1.5 TRD Sportivo (Indonesia; pre-facelift)

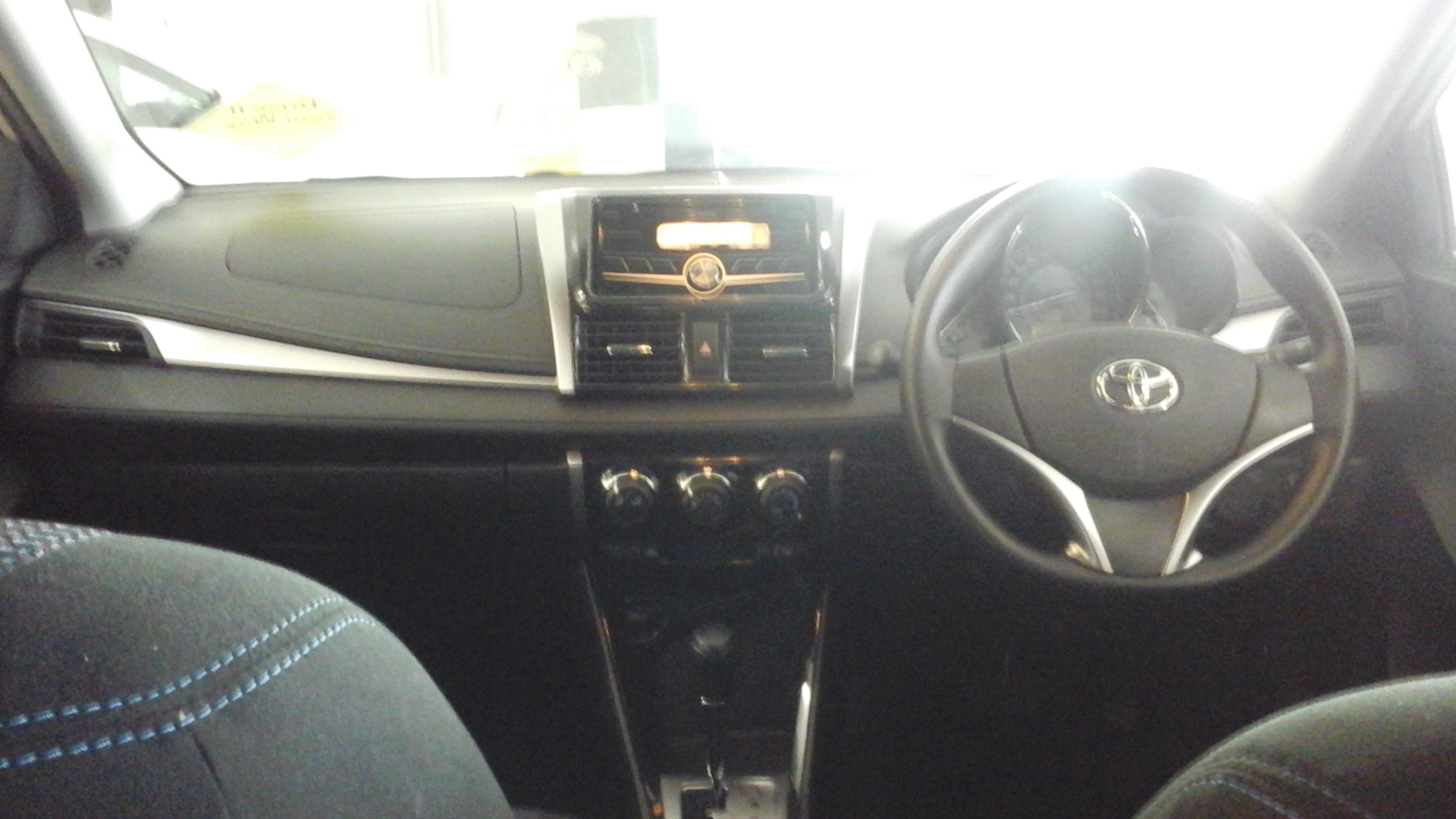
Interior of Vios 1.5 E (pre-facelift)

=== Facelift ===
The facelifted third-generation Vios was unveiled at the April 2016 Auto China. For the facelift model, there are projector headlamps with integrated LED light guides, a wider T-shaped grille and fog lamps shifted to the lower air-dam with vertical LED DRLs affixed on the bumper, similar to that of the pre-facelift XV70 series Camry. At the rear, the tail lamps feature LED-type units with revised graphics and feature a thinner linking chrome boot lid bar. This facelifted model is exclusively available in Thailand and China.

In most Asian countries (excluding Japan and Hong Kong), the facelifted Vios was sold from 2018 as a major facelift model with all-new body panels and interior. It uses model NSP151 model code for the cars with 1.5-litre engine, or NSP150 for the 1.3-litre models. It is also offered in India, the Middle East and Latin American countries as the Yaris Sedan. It measures an additional 10 mm (0.4 in) in length and 30 mm (1.2 in) in width.

The facelifted Vios is sold in Singapore, Brunei, Vietnam, Indonesia, Malaysia, Taiwan, the Philippines, Myanmar, Laos, and Cambodia. In the first 6 countries, the Vios is offered with the 1.5-litre 2NR-FE engine, while in the last 3 countries, it only powered by the smaller 1.3 L 1NR-FE engine. Both engines are offered in the Philippines. Although powered by the same engine as before the facelift, a different software calibration in the transmission made it more responsive. The platform used are based on the Vios sold in China and Thailand, but additional welds make it more rigid to provide better handling and ride. The Vios has advanced safety system for its class such as Traction Control and 7 SRS airbags. Rear disc brakes are only for the G model, and later the sporty GR-S.

The facelifted Vios received a minor facelift in July 2020 with a redesigned front bumper and grille, with integrated DRL dual lens LED headlamp for the range topping models. It also received added safety suite for the range topping variants.

The facelifted Vios received another minor facelift on 10 May 2023 exclusively for Vietnam, which incorporated Toyota's hammerhead design language.

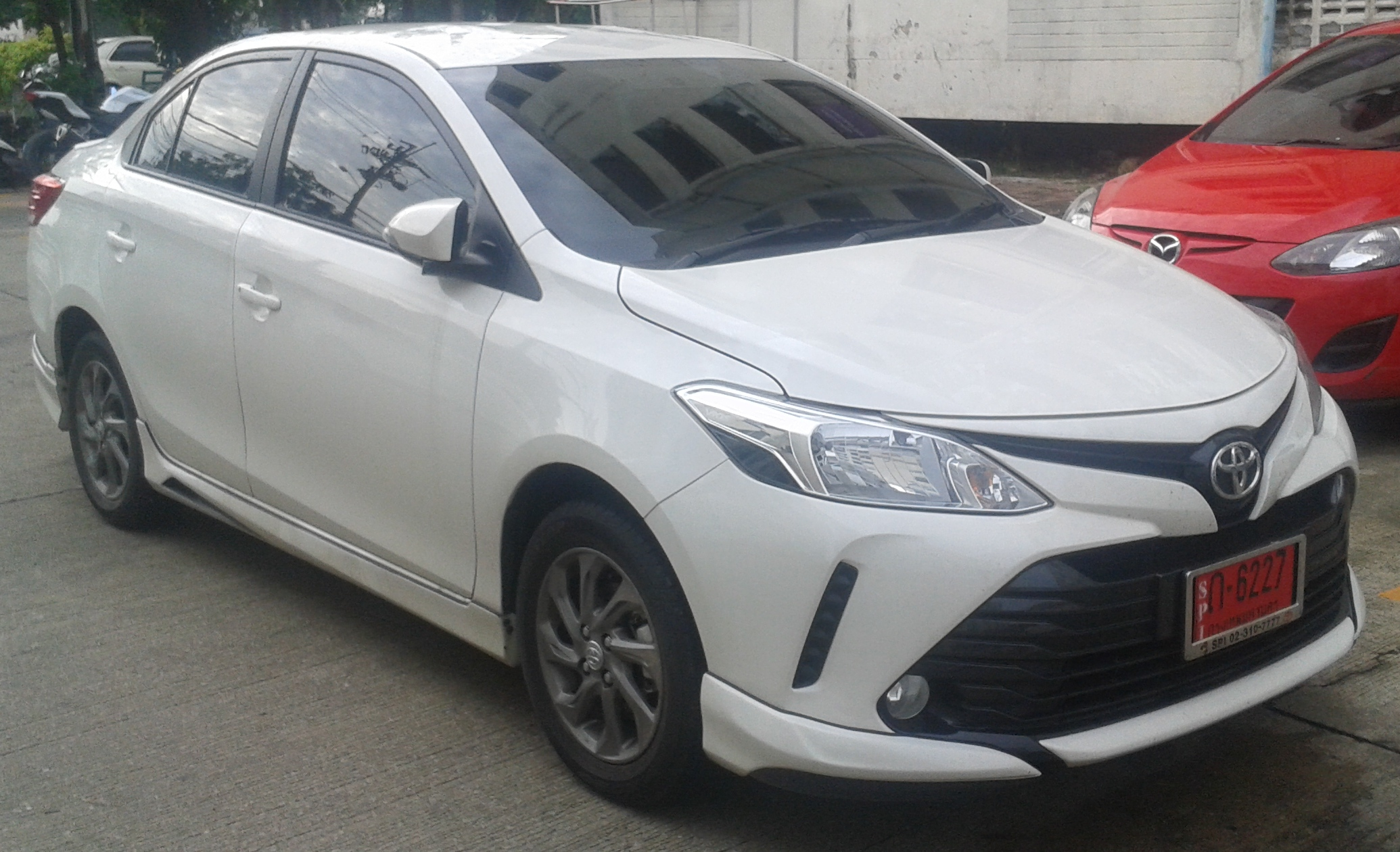
2017 Thai Vios 1.5 E (Thailand; facelift)

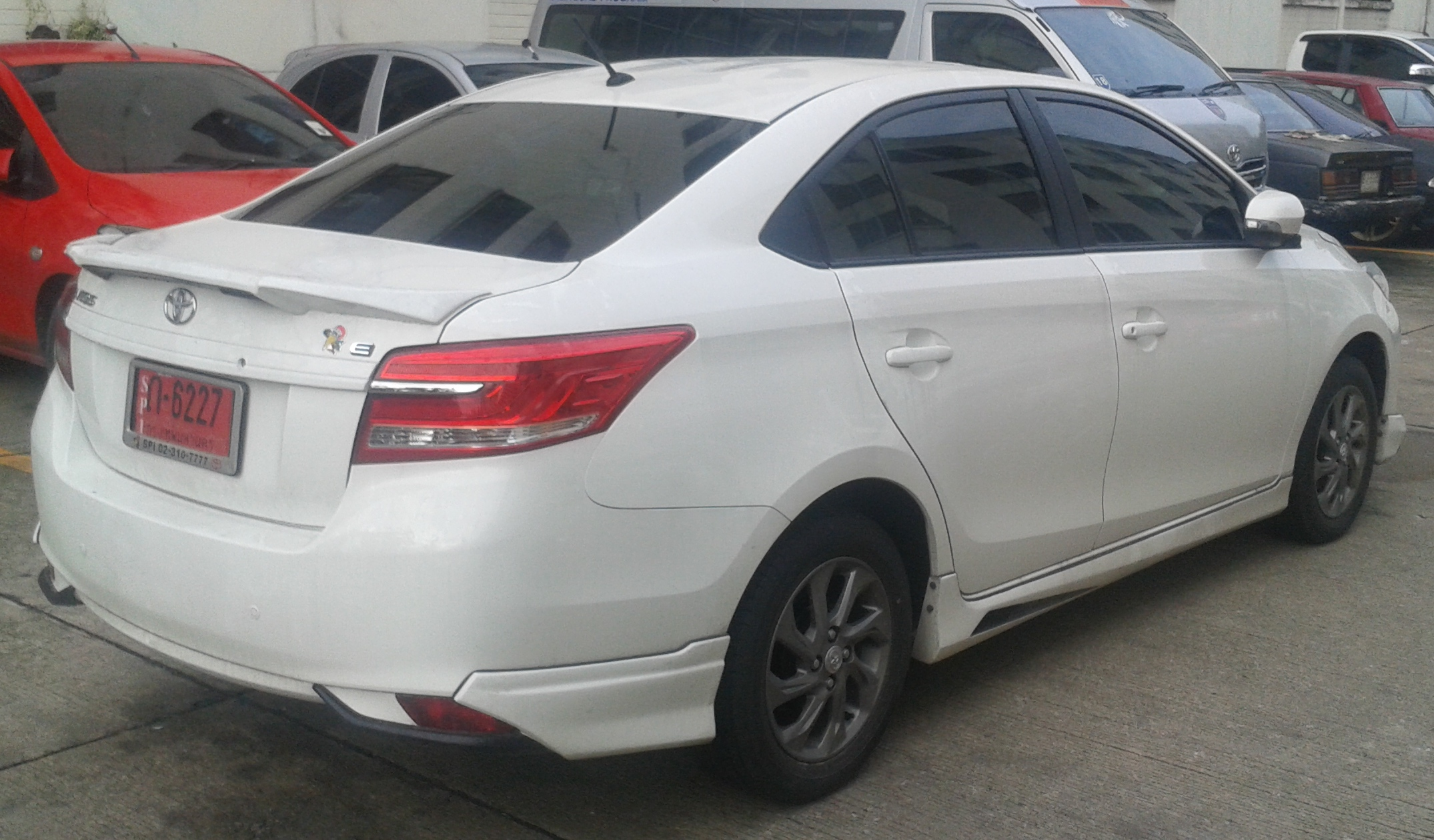
2017 Vios 1.5 E (Thailand; facelift)

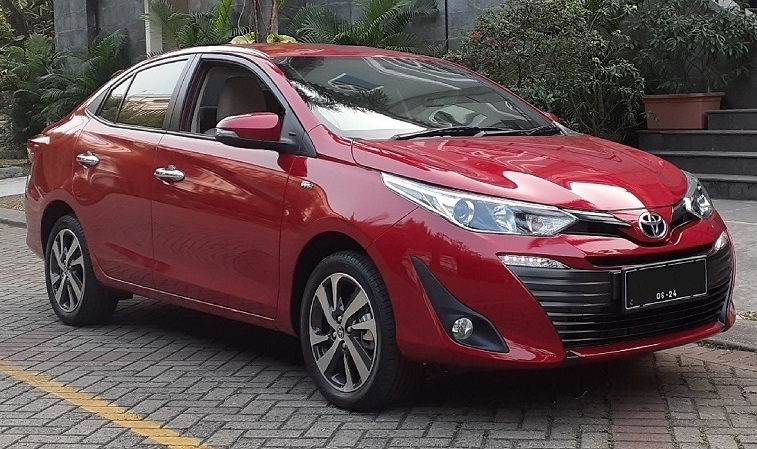
2019 Vios 1.5 G (Indonesia; first facelift)

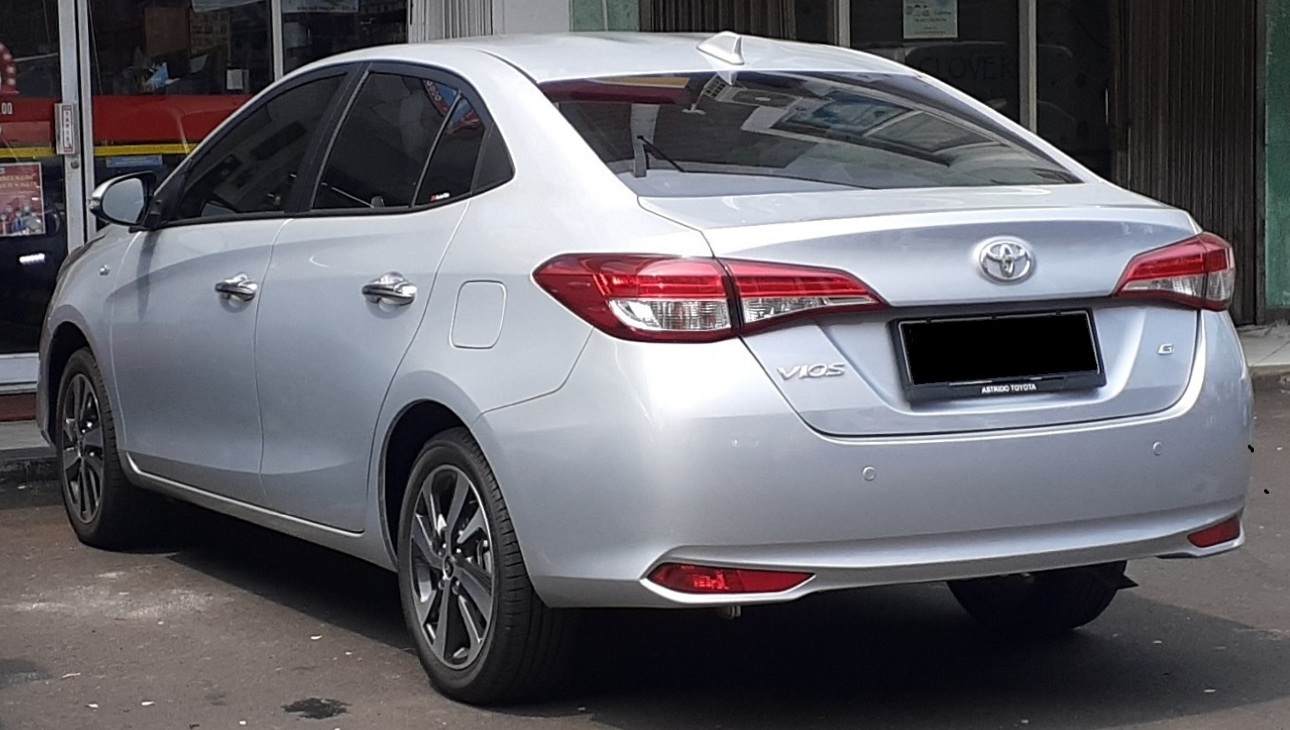
2021 Vios 1.5 G (Indonesia; first facelift)

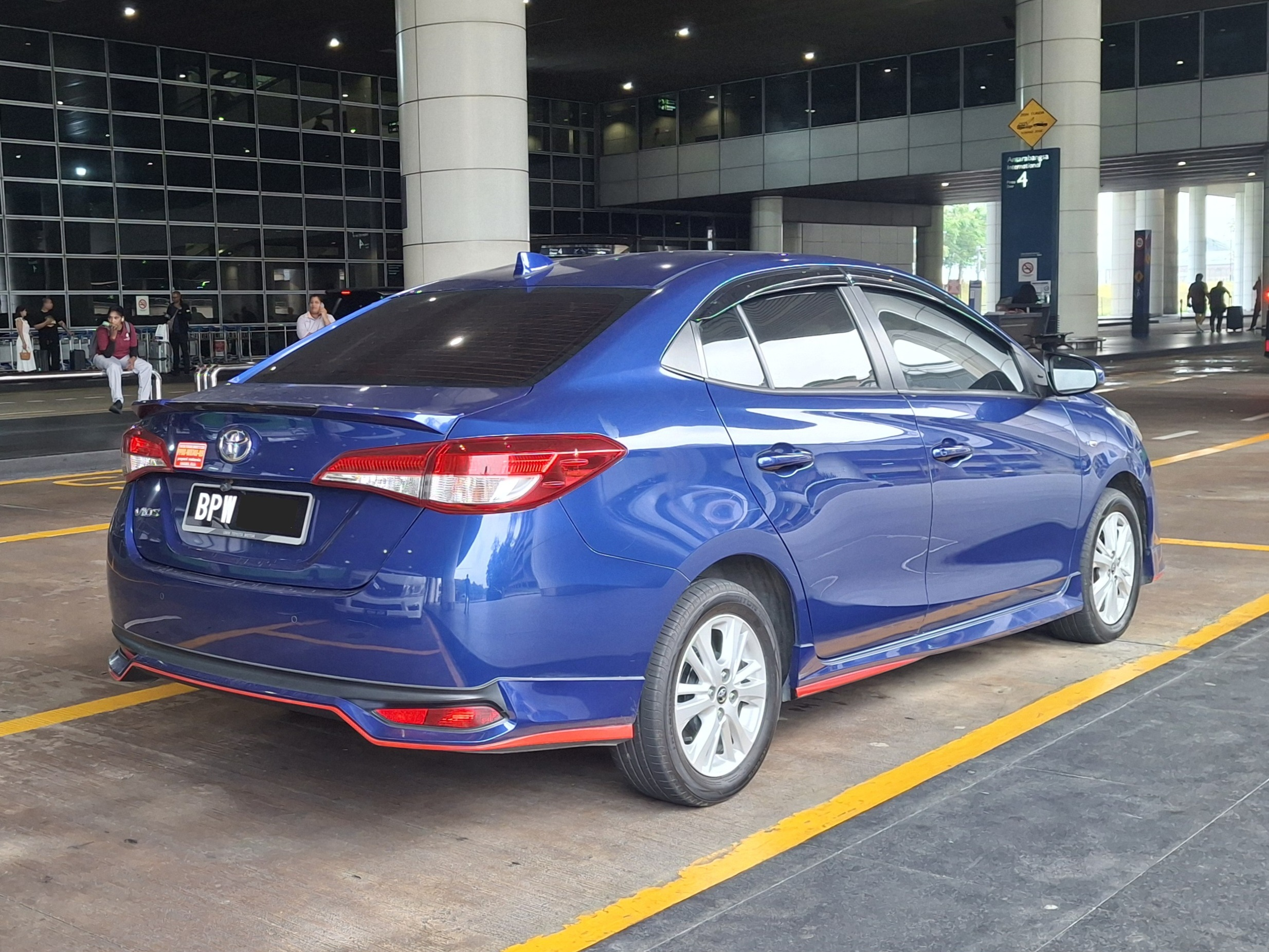
2020 Vios 1.5 J (first facelift; with Aerokit Package exclusively for Malaysia)

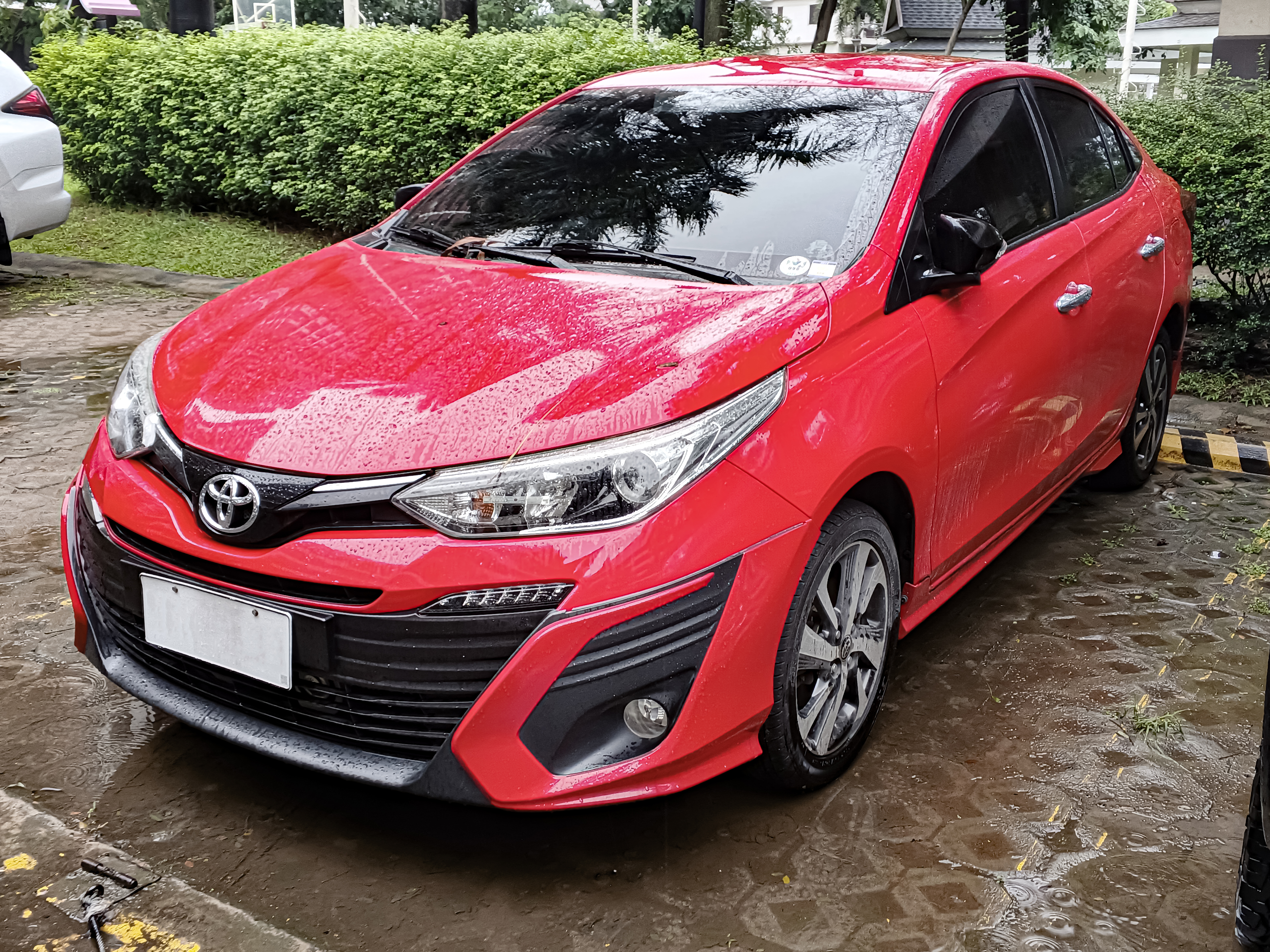
2020 Vios 1.5 G Prime (Philippines; first facelift)

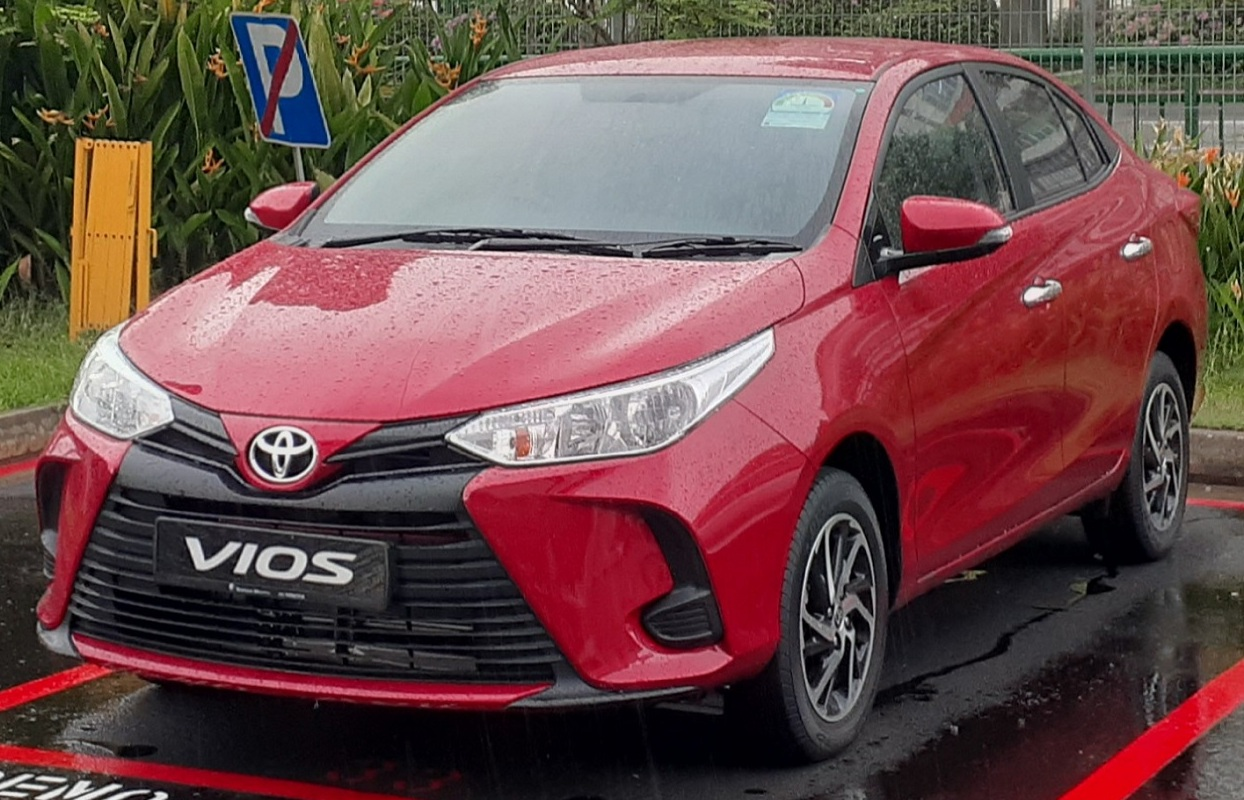
2022 Vios 1.5 E (Singapore; second facelift)

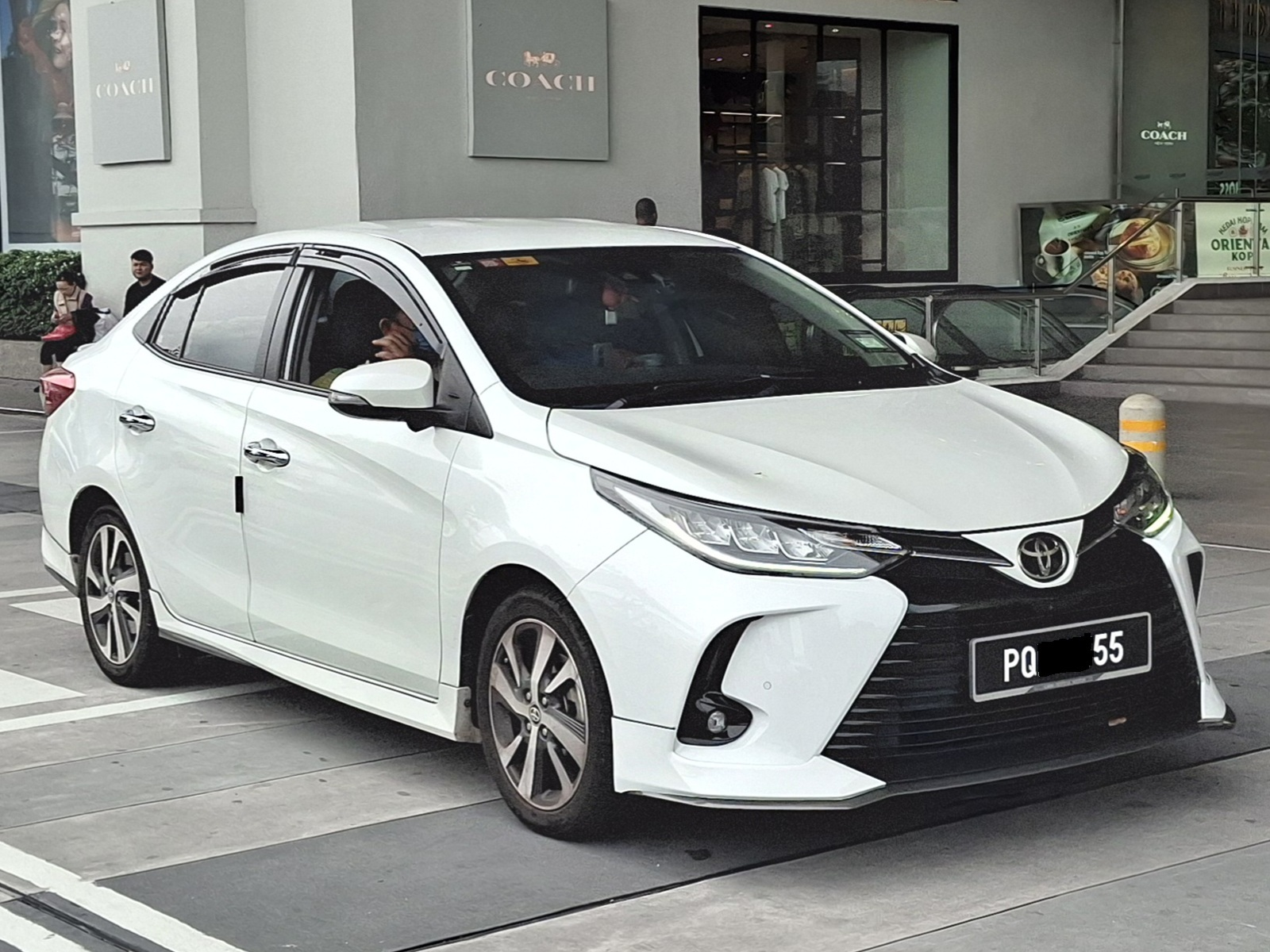
2021 Vios 1.5 G (second facelift; with Aerokit Package exclusively for Malaysia)

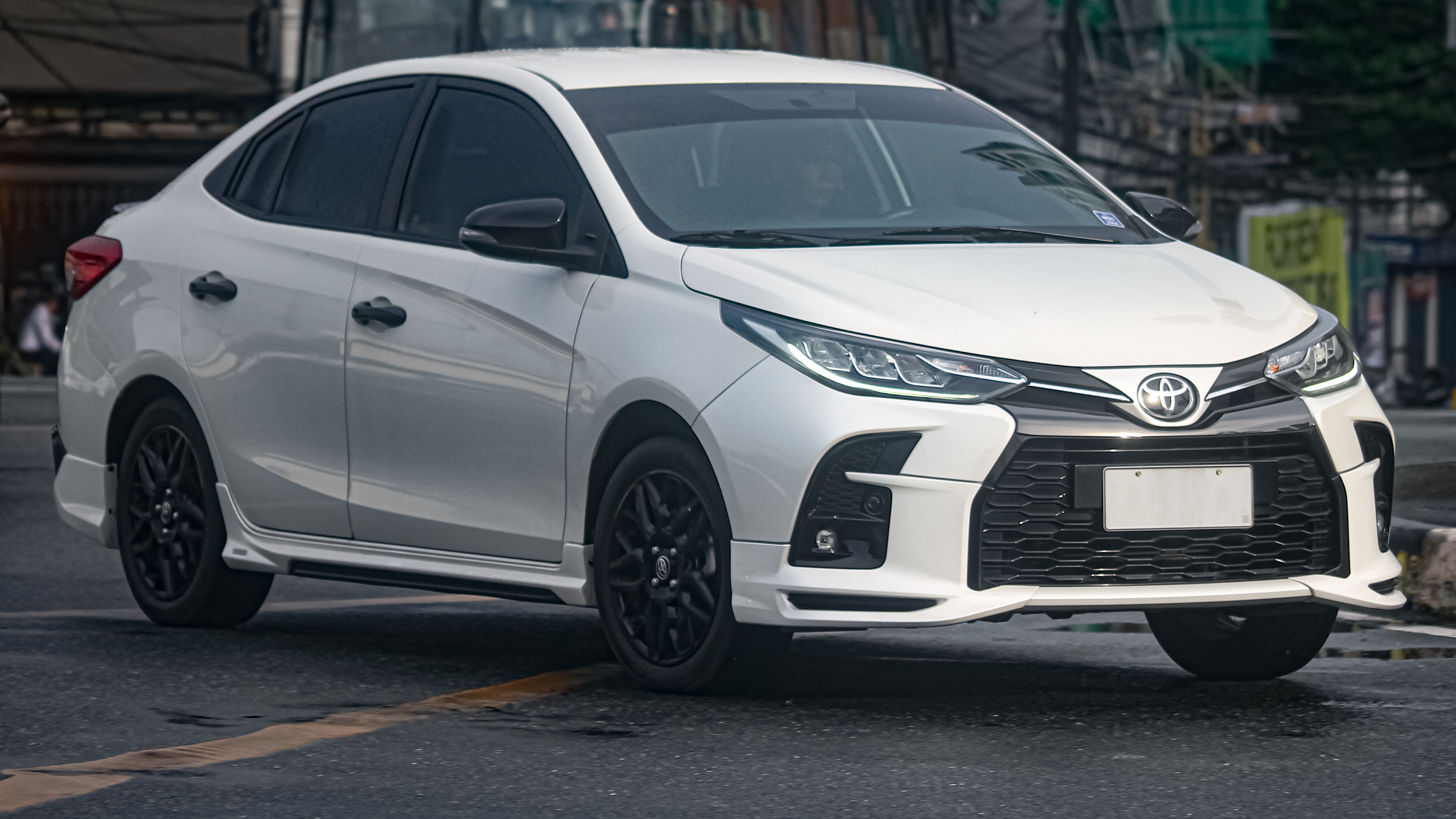
2021 Vios GR-S (Philippines)

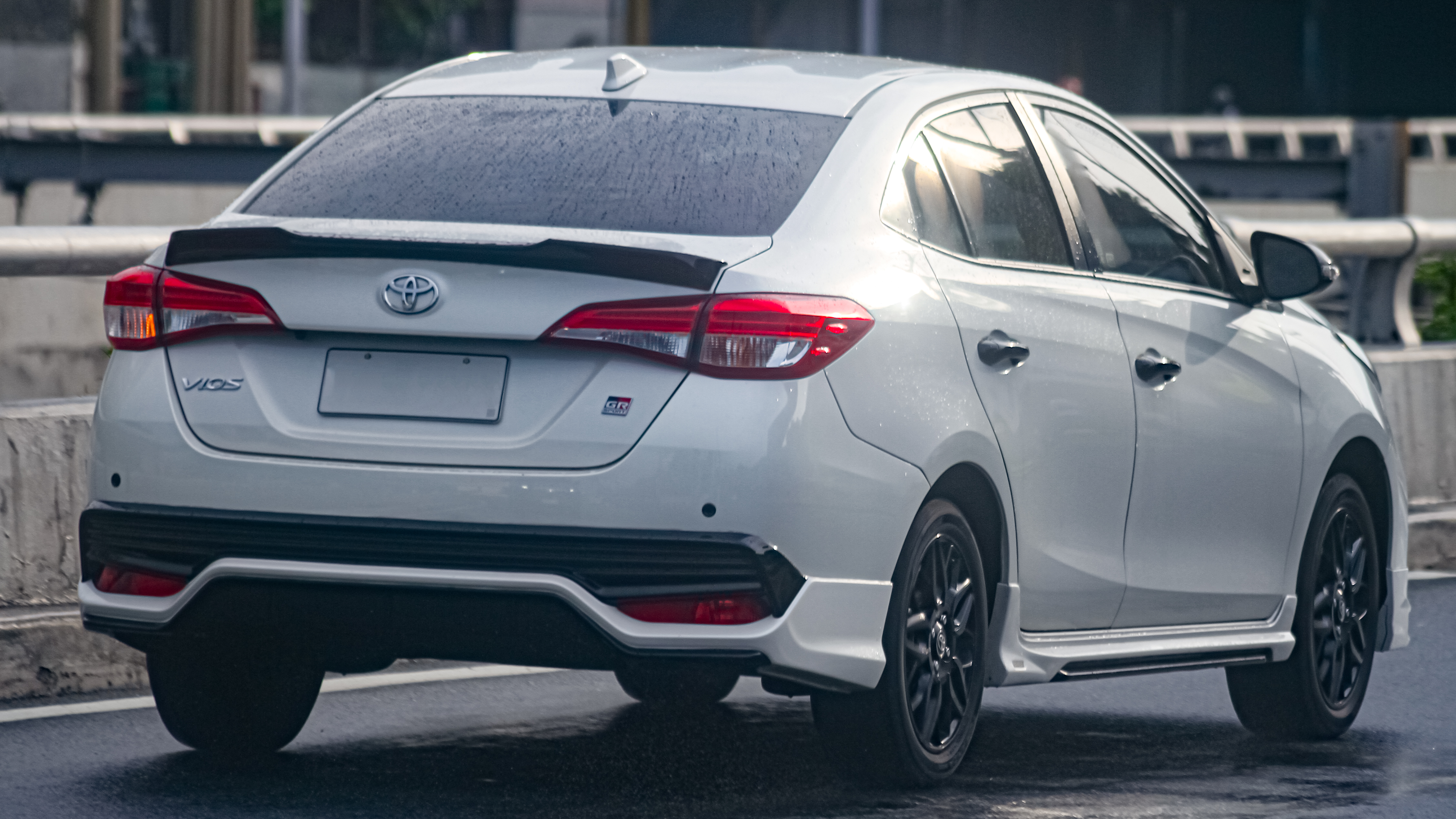
2021 Vios GR-S (Philippines)

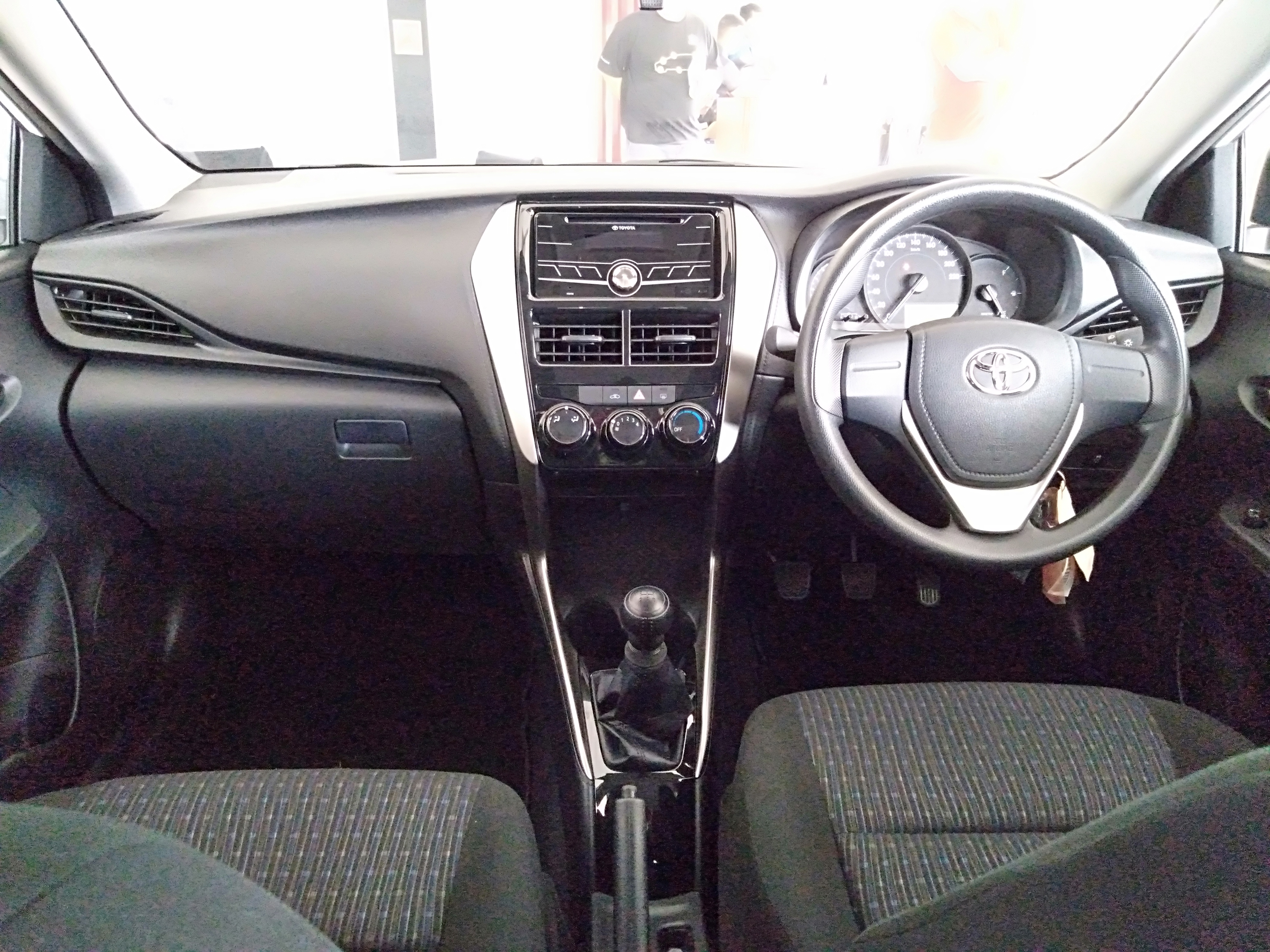
Interior

=== Markets ===
==== Thailand ====
The third-generation Vios was launched in March 2013 with four trim levels: J, E, G and S. The J and E trims were offered in either manual or automatic transmission. A TRD Sportivo model was introduced in May 2015.

From 2016 in Thailand, the 1NZ-FE VVT-i engine was replaced by the flex-fuel 2NR-FBE 1.5-litre Dual VVT-i engine. The four-speed automatic transmission was replaced with a CVT gearbox with seven-speed mode. The five-speed manual was dropped from the lineup, while the safety kit has been given an upgrade. An "Exclusive" version was introduced for 2016 to replace TRD Sportivo model.

The facelifted Vios was launched in Thailand in January 2017, featuring the same front fascia as Chinese market model. Trim levels offered include J, E, G and S, later categorised as Entry, Mid, and High trim levels from 2018.

==== Singapore ====
The Vios was first unveiled in Singapore in May 2013. It is available in two trim levels: E and G variants. Both are equipped with an automatic transmission.

In January 2017, the Vios was reintroduced to the lineup with the newer 2NR-FE engine and continuously variable transmission (CVT) with 7-speed sport sequential mode and was available from the local dealership for a short period of time until April 2017.

The Yaris Ativ-based facelifted Vios was later introduced in December 2017 for the 2018 model year. The Vios for the Singapore market was offered in E and G model grades with only automatic CVT with a 1.5-litre 2NR-FE engine.

In January 2021, the Vios received a minor facelift with a revised front end and added connectivity features such as Apple CarPlay and wireless Qi charging. The E model received restyled 15” alloy wheels. The Vios continued to be sold there until it was removed from Borneo Motors' line up in April 2023.

==== Brunei ====
The third-generation Vios was launched in Brunei in mid-2013 and the model were offered in E (4-speed automatic transmission) and J (5-speed manual transmission) variants powered in 1.5-litre 1NZ-FE petrol engine, which the models were imported from Indonesia.

In 2017, the Vios received an update with new 2NR-FE Dual VVT-i petrol engine (E and J grade) and 7-speed CVT (E grade).

In mid-2018, the Vios received a first facelift with new updates: front fog lamps, daytime running lights (E grade), new alloy wheels, paddle shifters (E grade), 7 airbags, reverse sensors (E grade), VSC and hill-hold assist.

In January 2021, the Vios was received a second facelift with 7-inch touchscreen infotainment display (E grade), and the daytime running lights for the E grade have been dropped.

==== Malaysia ====
The third-generation Vios was launched in Malaysia in October 2013, and was sold in six different trim choices which are J manual, J automatic, E automatic, G automatic, GX (X stand for Extra) and TRD Sportivo automatic.

In September 2016, the third-generation Vios received a newer engine and additional features. The 1NZ-FE VVT-i engine was replaced by the 2NR-FE Dual VVT-i engine across the lineup and the four-speed automatic transmission was replaced by a CVT with seven-speed mode.

In January 2015, April 2017, and January 2018, the vehicle received minor updates which mainly consists of additional features. In July 2017, a "Sports Edition" trim was introduced based on the J trim. This model even has a unique nickname, The Vios Keli (Catfish).

The major facelifted Vios was launched in January 2019. The GX and TRD Sportivo trim levels were discontinued, leaving only J, E and G trim in the lineup. Manual transmission is no longer offered on the J trim. All trim levels have standard 7 SRS Airbags and ABS. Exclusively for the Malaysian market, the locally assembled Vios was available with optional Aerokit Package which include front bumper garnishes, boot lid spoiler, and all-around lower spoilers. The G model came loaded with disc brake on all wheels, chrome outside & inside door handles, leather interior, Optitron meter with MID, and 360-degree parking sensor.

In December 2020, the second facelift model went on sale. The same J, E and G trim has been retained. Alongside the existing trim levels, the GR-S trim was introduced. It is a locally engineered model and the first model to wear the GR Sport badge in the Malaysian market. The headlining features are the "10-speed CVT" – which Toyota programmed the stepless automatic gearbox to have 10 virtual ratios in its manual mode, and sports-tuned suspension. It is equipped with 17-inch black multi-spoke wheels. The GR-S trim is available exclusively at GR Garage outlets and Toyota dealers participating in the Vios Challenge, a one-make race series in Malaysia.

==== Philippines ====
In the Philippines, the third-generation Vios was launched in July 2013 with the same four trim levels as the outgoing model: 1.3 Base, 1.3 J, 1.3 E, and 1.5 G. Toyota Motor Philippines produces the Vios in their production plant in Santa Rosa, Laguna. It is equipped with either a 1.3-litre 2NZ-FE or a 1.5-litre 1NZ-FE engine. In 2015, the TRD trim with TRD alloy wheels and body kit was released. In July 2016, the Vios received a newer engine, the 1.3-litre 1NR-FE and 1.5-litre 2NR-FE engine with Dual VVT-i, both available with both 5-speed manual and CVT transmission.

The facelifted Vios was launched in July 2018. Initial trim levels on offer were the 1.3 Base, 1.3 J, 1.3 E, 1.5 G, and two newer trim levels, the 1.3 E Prime and 1.5 G Prime, which replaced the TRD trim. The Prime models have boot spoiler and all around lower body kits. In January 2019, the XE grade was added between the J and E grades and came with hubcaps and a CVT transmission. In November 2019, the XLE grade was added between the XE and E grades.

In July 2020, the second facelift model was released, along with additional features for the lesser grades, the E Prime and G Prime grades had removed at the same time. In March 2021, the GR-S grade was added to the lineup, which was discontinued in January 2024. In December 2023, the 1.3 Base and 1.3 E grades were discontinued from the lineup.

==== Indonesia ====
The third-generation Vios was launched for the Indonesian market in May 2013 and initially imported from Thailand. Starting from December 2013, the Vios had been made locally assembled in Karawang, where the vehicles were exported to Brunei and GCC countries under the Yaris sedan nameplate. It was the only sedan model to be manufactured at TMMIN Karawang Plant 2. Two trim levels were available; the 1.5 E and 1.5 G which were powered by the 1.5-litre 1NZ-FE engine paired with either 5-speed manual, or 4-speed automatic transmission. The TRD Sportivo model was launched in September 2014. A downgraded model was sold for the fleet taxi market as the Limo.

The Vios received an update in November 2016 with the newer 1.5-litre 2NR-FE Dual VVT-i engine mated to a 5-speed manual transmission or CVT. The G and TRD Sportivo received new alloy wheels, and boot spoiler was exclusively installed on the TRD Sportivo.

The major facelift Vios was launched in April 2018. Only the E and G were offered; the TRD Sportivo was discontinued. The top-of-the-line G has all disc brakes, 16-inch alloy wheels, Multi Information Display (MID), projector headlamps, LED tail lamps and for the G with CVT gearbox also comes with paddle shifter.

The Limo model was replaced by the Avanza-based Transmover.

The second facelifted model with new bumper and front fascia changes was not released due to limited demand of the sedan in the country.

==== Vietnam ====
In Vietnam, the Vios is offered in 2 trim levels; E (5-speed manual and CVT) and G (CVT). All trims have the 1.5-litre engine. The first and second facelift models based on the Yaris Ativ sedan was launched in August 2018 and February 2021 respectively, the trim levels are carried over from the pre-facelift model and in the 2021 facelift, the GR-S model was also added to the lineup.

The model is the best-selling car in Vietnam continuously from 2014 to 2018, with 67,787 cars sold during the period. The Vios continued at the top of yearly sales charts through to 2020.

In May 2023, instead of introducing the fourth-generation Vios like the neighboring countries, the third facelift model was introduced instead exclusively for Vietnamese market by adoption the facelifted Thai market Yaris front fascia, rims and slightly different rear bumper. The top of the line G trim is also improved with additional pre-collision warning and lane departure warning safety features.

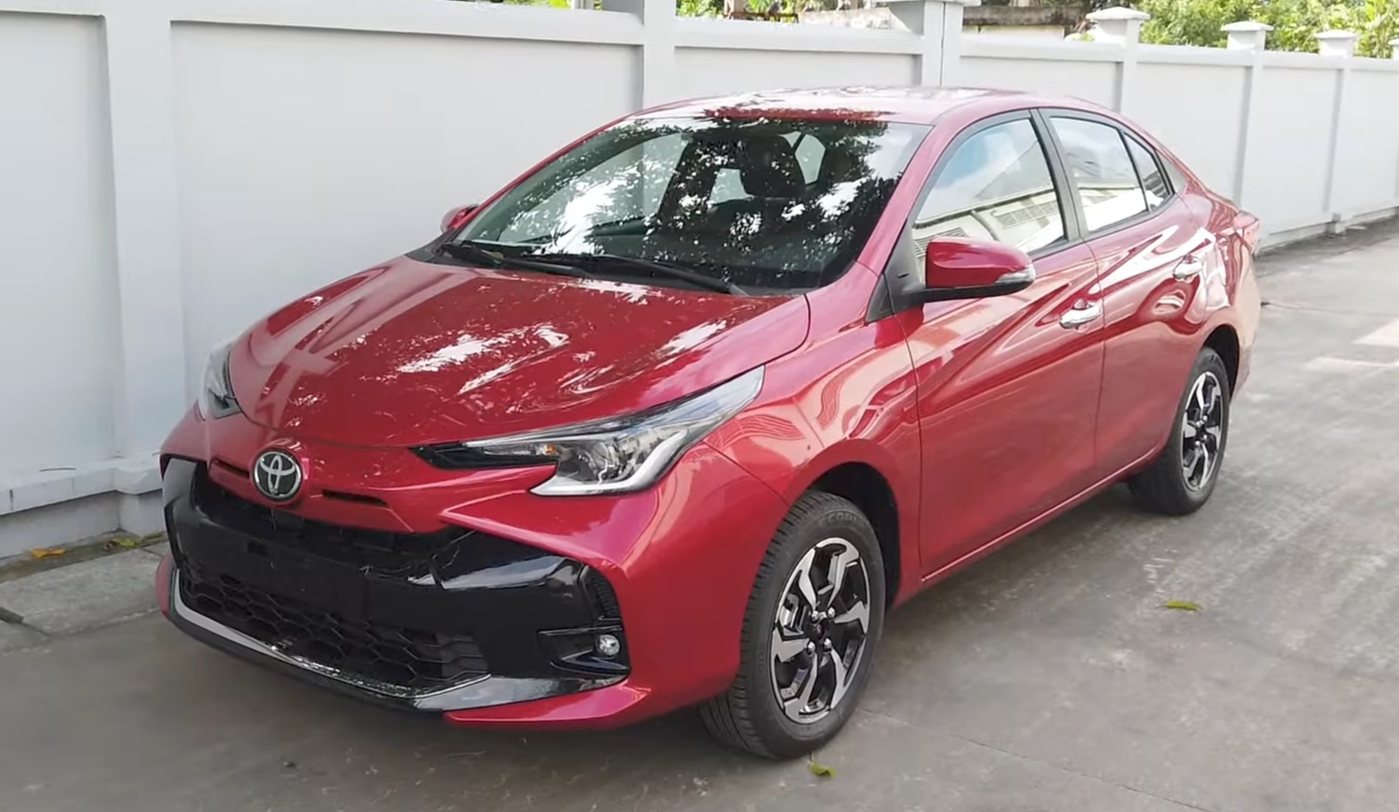
2023 Vios G (third facelift, Vietnam)

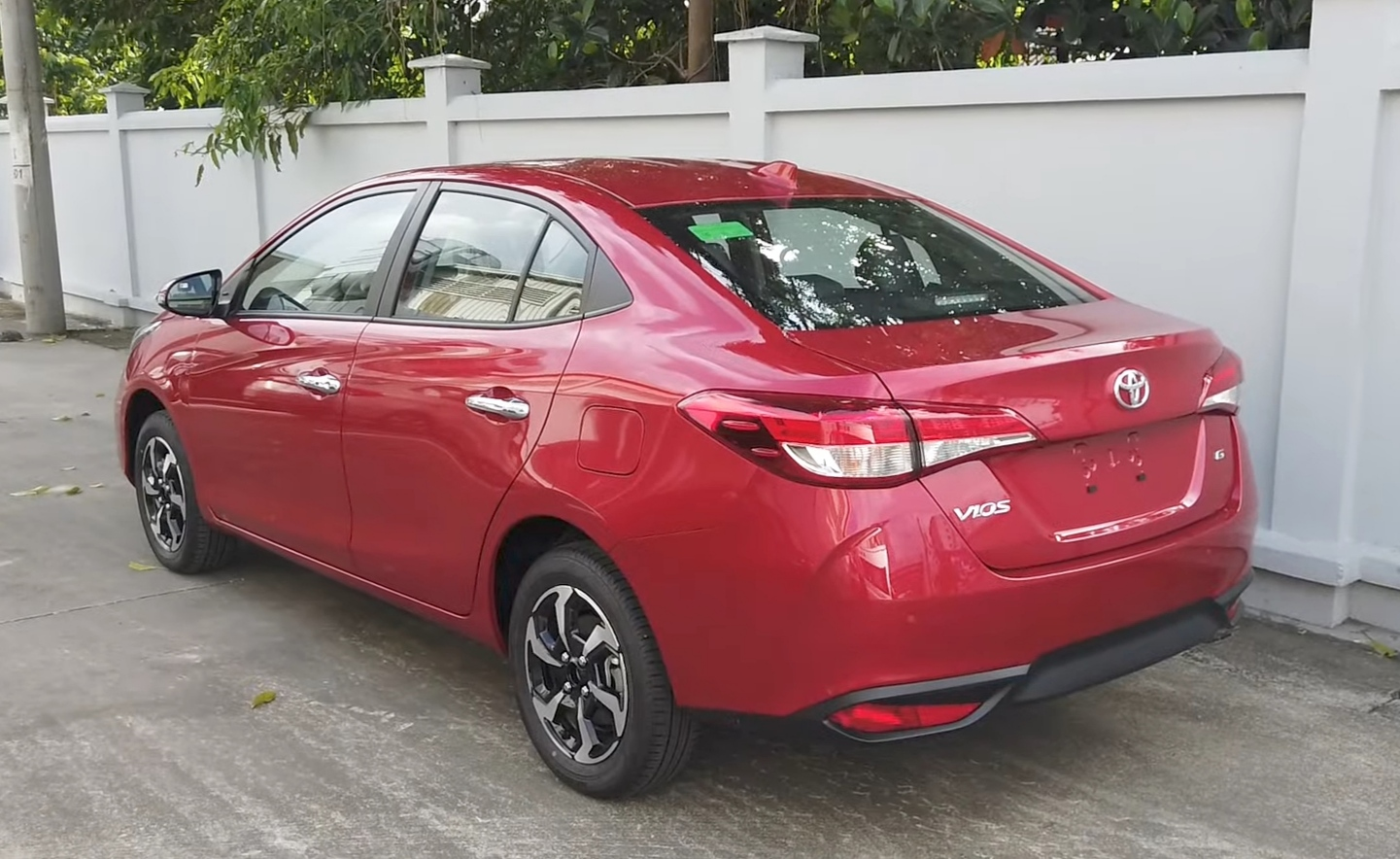
2023 Vios G (third facelift, Vietnam)

==== Taiwan ====
In Taiwan, the third-generation Vios was available from the second quarter of 2014. Three models have since been available in Classic, Elegant and Luxury variants. All models use the same 1.5 L 1NZ-FE engine from the previous model. In the second quarter of 2016, the 1NZ-FE engine was replaced by the 2NR-FE engine and a CVT.

In March 2018, the major facelift model with all-new body panels, refreshed exterior, and 2NR-FE engine was launched. Trim levels are the same as the pre-facelift models, and the only gearbox is CVT.

In 2021, the Taiwanese Vios received minor changes with black plastic front bumper garnish on each side and restyled 15-inch alloy wheels. Only the Classic and Luxury were offered – the Elegant grade was discontinued.

In September 2026, Hotai Motor confirmed that the model will end its production in the end of 2026, citing lower demand for sedans and use of the factory to produce the Noah/Voxy as reasons for discontinuation.

==== China ====
The Vios was launched in China in November 2013 after its debut at the Shanghai Auto Show in April. The Vios is now only available in either 1.3- or 1.5-litre engine variants with the higher end 1.6 L model dropped. The Vios for the Chinese market are produced by the FAW Toyota joint venture. Both models are powered by newer Dual VVT-i engines 4NR-FE and 5NR-FE specially developed for the Chinese market.

In 2016, a facelifted hatchback version of the third-generation Vios was launched exclusively in China by the FAW Toyota joint venture. Based on the Yaris hatchback, it is known as the Vios FS (Chinese: 威驰FS; pinyin: Wēichí FS). The Chinese market also received the Vios-based Yaris L sedan. A 5-speed manual and CVT option are standard for both engines.

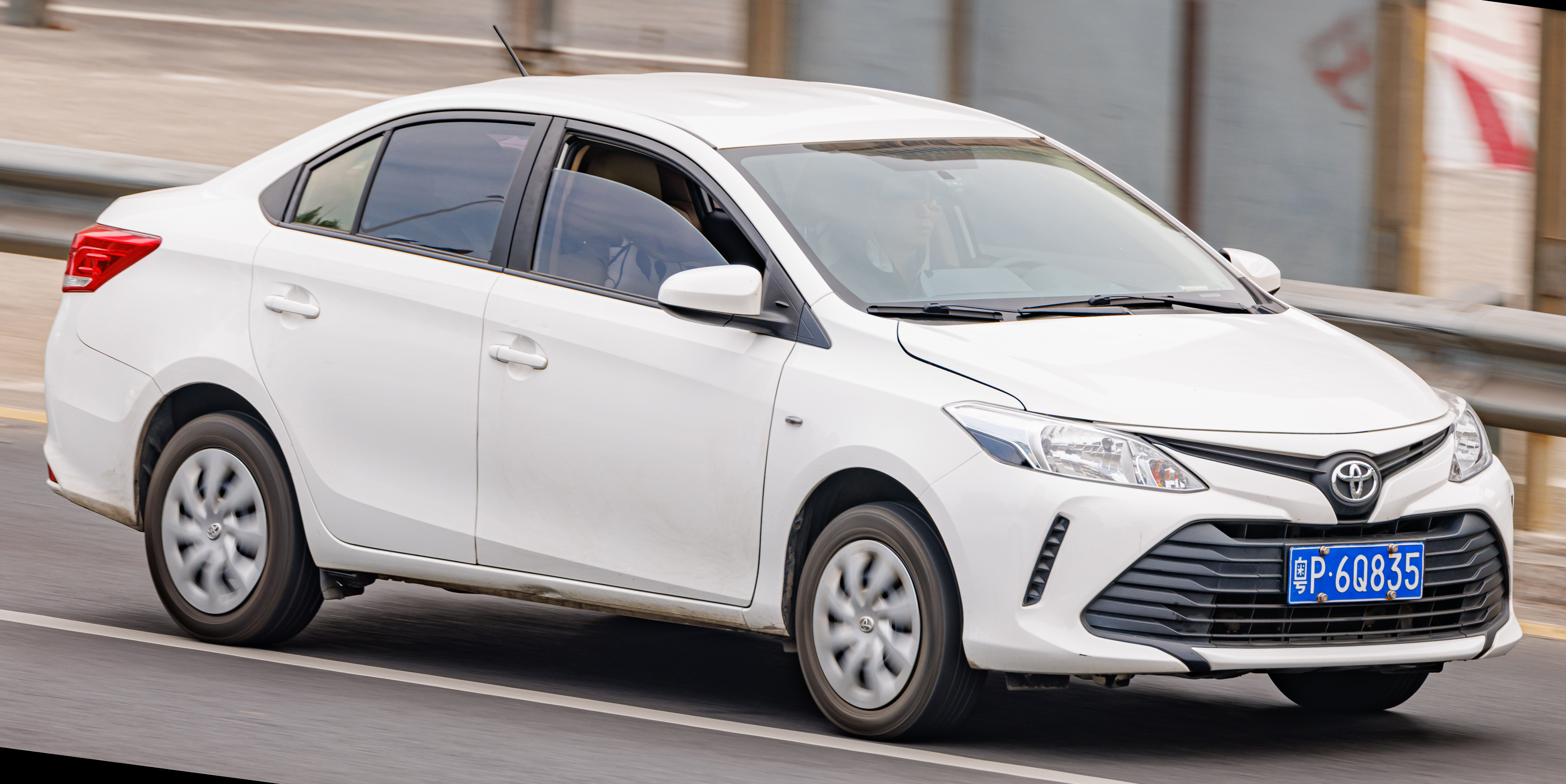
FAW Toyota Vios sedan (China; first facelift)

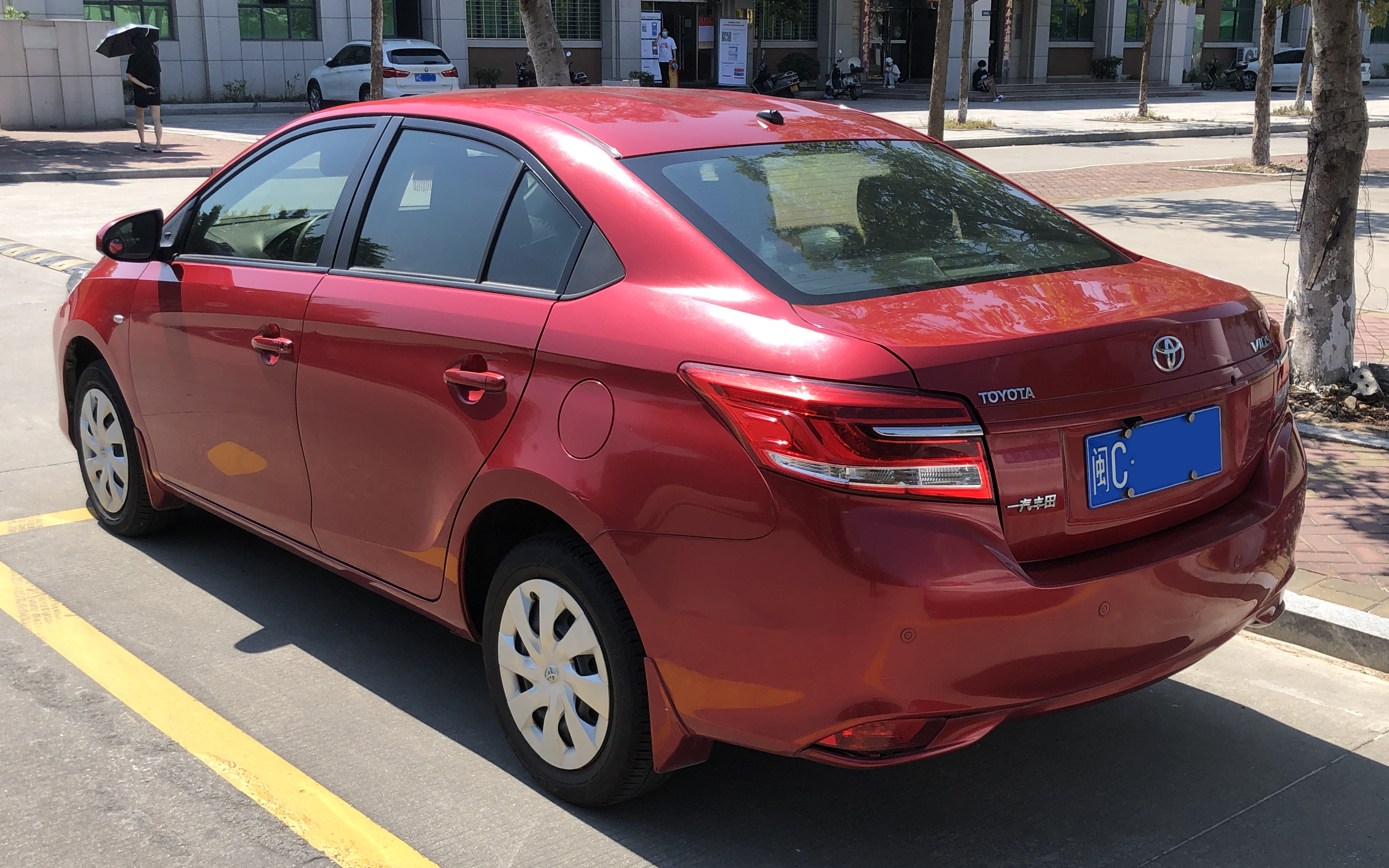
FAW Toyota Vios sedan (China; first facelift)

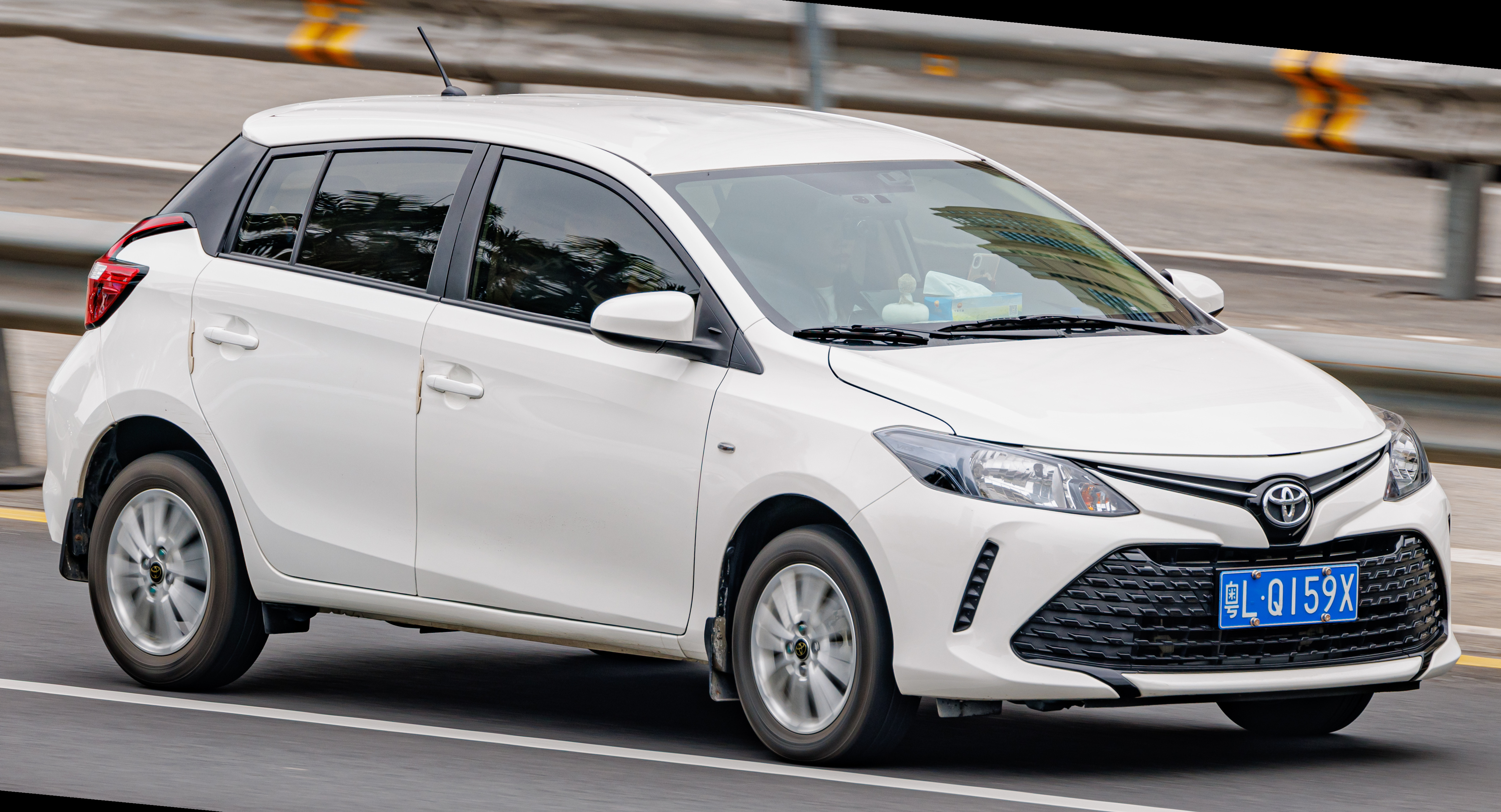
FAW Toyota Vios FS (China; first facelift)

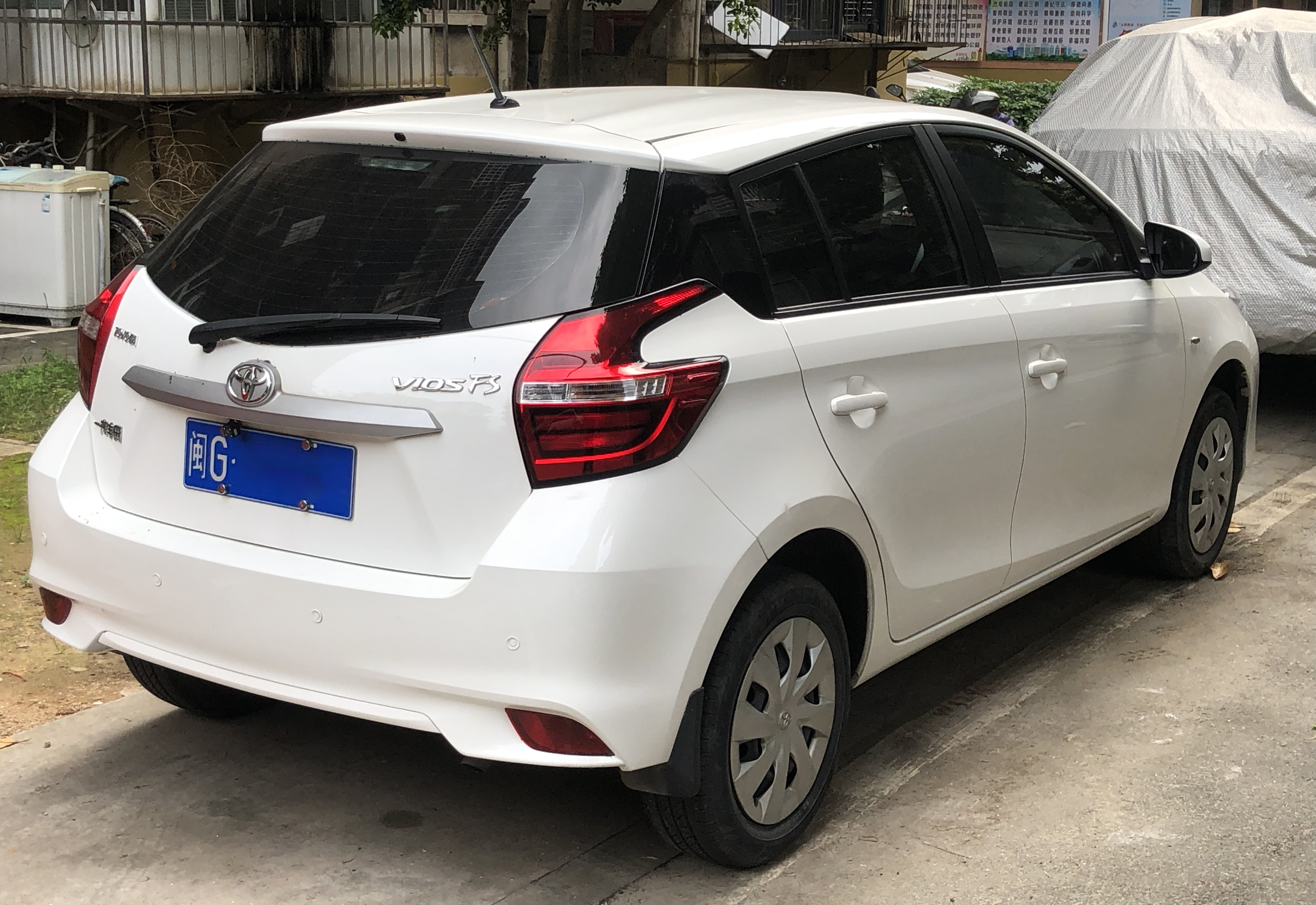
FAW Toyota Vios FS (China; first facelift)

FAW Toyota Vios sedan (China; second facelift)

FAW Toyota Vios sedan (China; second facelift)

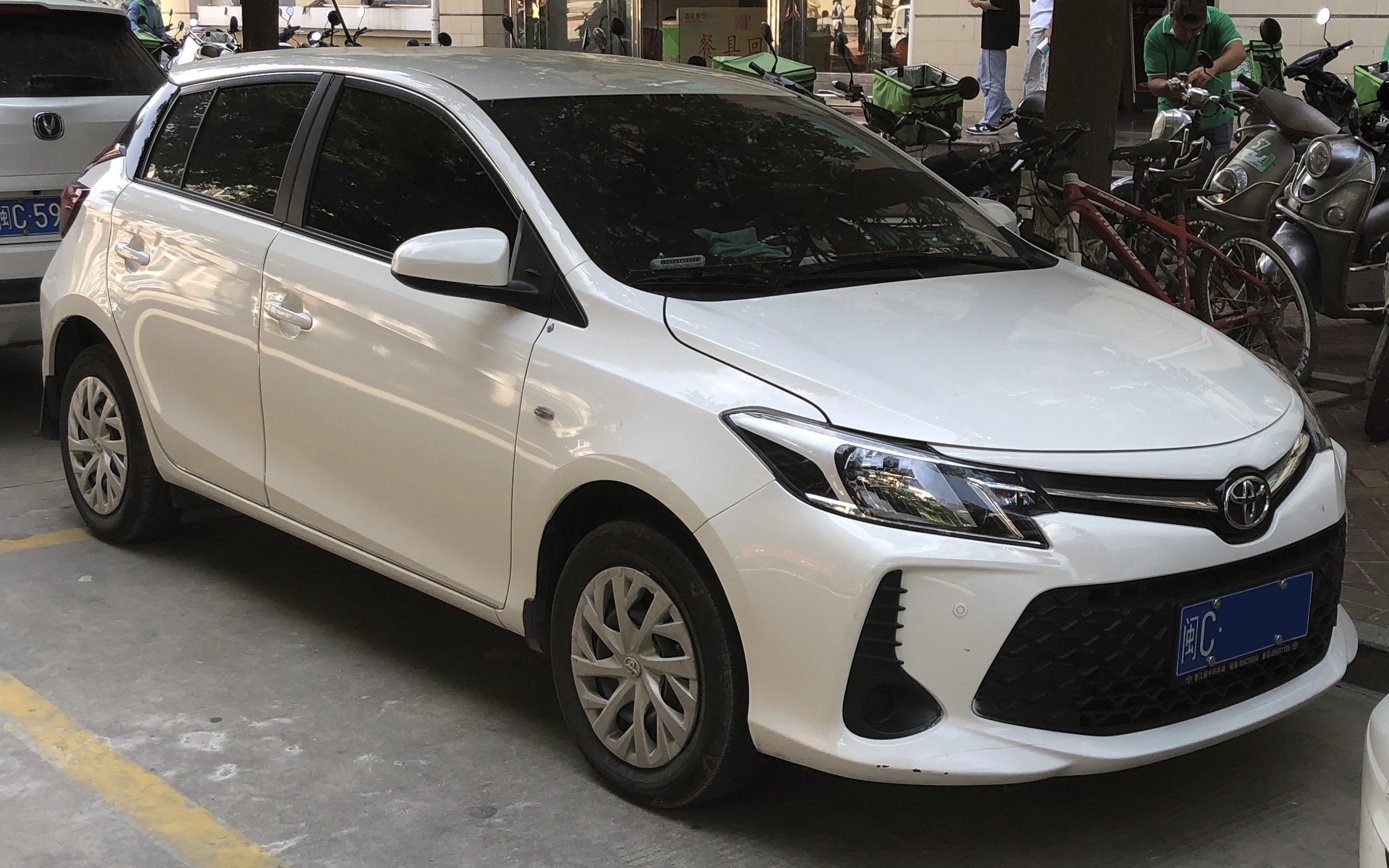
FAW Toyota Vios FS (China; second facelift)

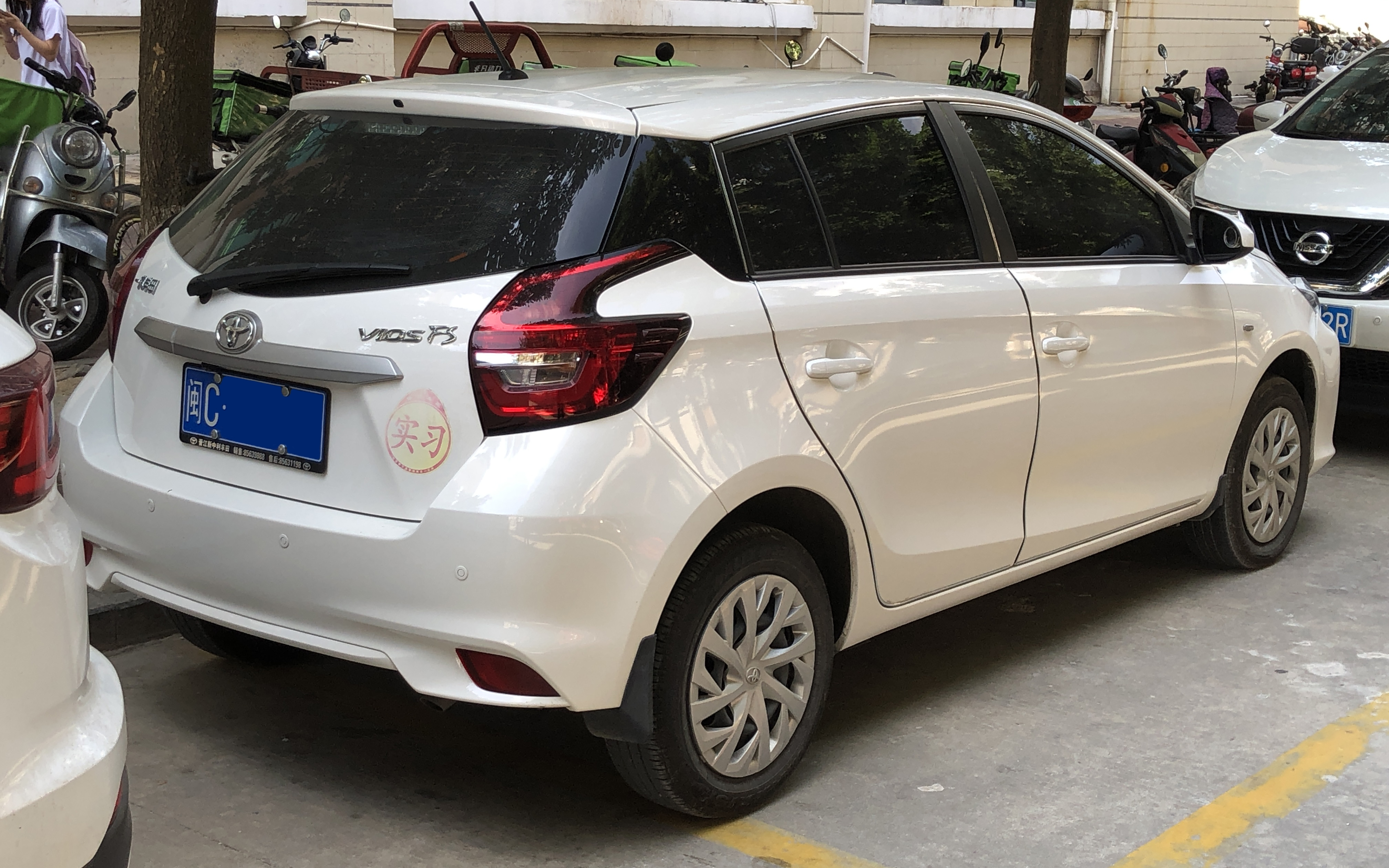
FAW Toyota Vios FS (China; second facelift)

=== Safety ===
Vios (2017, NSP151)	Safety features													
Trim Variant	J/Limo (Entry)				E (Mid), G (High)							GR-S		
Market	(Thailand)	(Philippines)	(Malaysia)	(Indonesia)	(Indonesia)	(Thailand)	(Philippines)	(Malaysia)	(Brunei)	(Singapore)	(Vietnam)	(Philippines)	(Malaysia)	(Vietnam)
ABS with EBD and BA	✔													
VSC and HAC	✔													
Airbags	2–7													

==== ASEAN NCAP ====
ASEAN NCAP test results Toyota Vios (2017)
Test	Points
Overall:	5 /5 stars
Adult occupant:	41.52
Child occupant:	21.66
Safety assist:	17.24
Motorcyclist Safety:	NA

ASEAN NCAP test results Toyota Yaris Ativ (2017)
Test	Points
Overall:	5 /5 stars
Adult occupant:	44.70
Child occupant:	21.66
Safety assist:	22.22

ASEAN NCAP test results Toyota Yaris (2017)
Test	Points
Overall:	5 /5 stars
Adult occupant:	41.65
Child occupant:	19.95
Safety assist:	19.18

==== Latin NCAP ====
Latin NCAP 2.0 test results Toyota Yaris + 2 Airbags (2019, based on Euro NCAP 2008)
Test	Points	Stars
Adult occupant:	25.49/34.0	3 /5 stars
Child occupant:	28.05/49.00	4 /5 stars

Latin NCAP 3.0 test results Toyota Yaris + 2 Airbags (2021, similar to Euro NCAP 2014)
Test	Points	%
Overall:	1 /5 stars	
Adult occupant:	16.57	41%
Child occupant:	31.29	64%
Pedestrian:	25.98	62%
Safety assist:	18.00	42%

==== TNCAP ====
TNCAP (1.0) test result Toyota Vios 'Classic' (2023, similar to Euro NCAP 2017)
Test	Points	%
Overall:	3/5 stars	
Adult occupant:	28.997	76%
Child occupant:	15.602	31%
Pedestrian:	24.795	59%
Safety assist:	3	25%

== Fourth generation (AC100; 2022) ==
Fourth generation
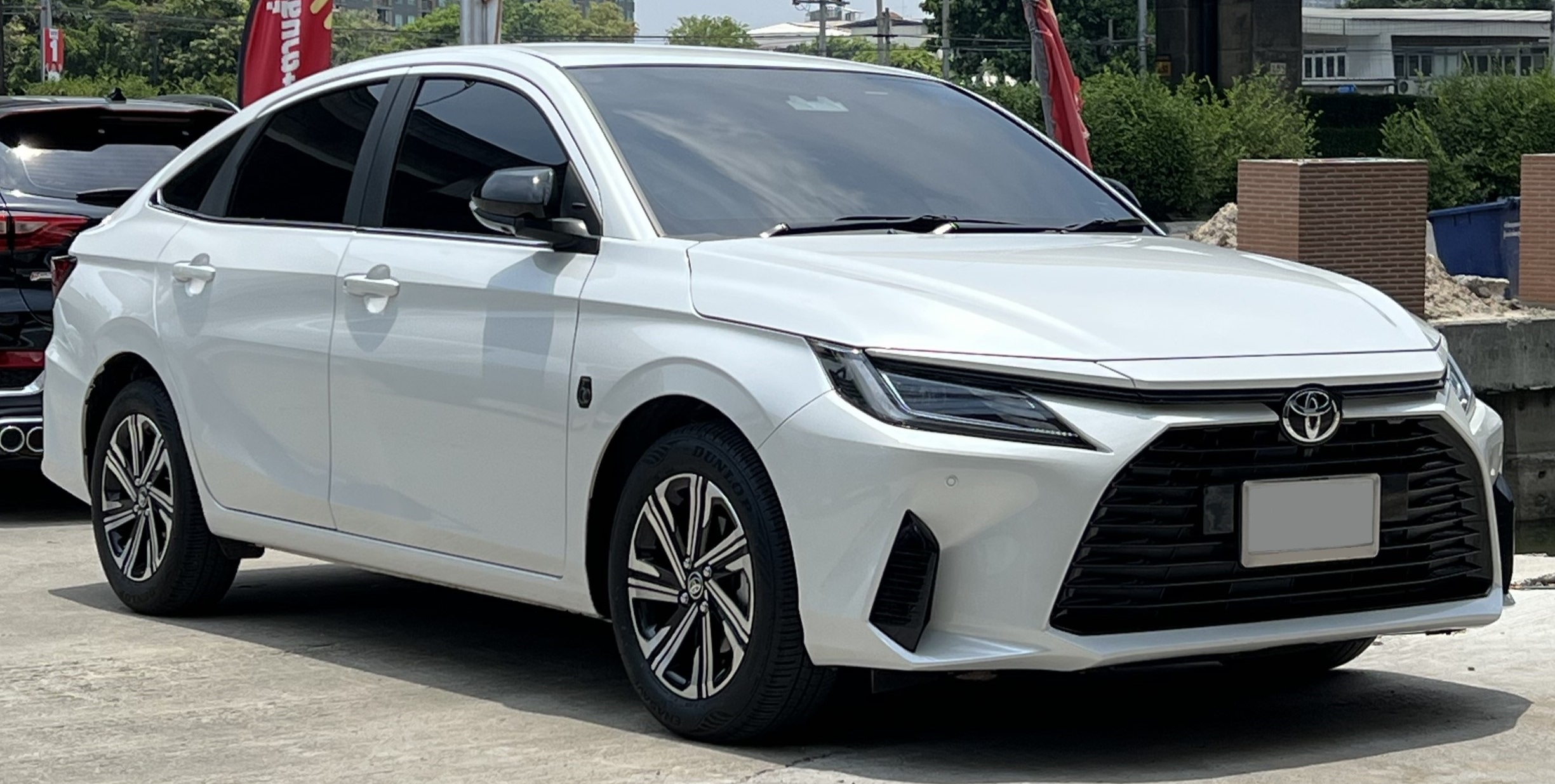
- 2022 Yaris Ativ Premium Luxury (NGC100, Thailand)

Overview
- Model code: AC100
- Also called: Toyota Yaris sedan (Middle East and Latin America); Toyota Yaris Ativ (Thailand and Sri Lanka); Toyota Yaris Fastback (Ecuador); Toyota Vios Ativ (Philippines)
- Production: 2022–present
- Assembly: Thailand: Chachoengsao (TMT); Malaysia: Bukit Raja (UMW)
- Designer: Eishi Araki and Shun Ohoka

Body and chassis
- Body style: 4-door saloon
- Platform: Daihatsu New Global Architecture: DNGA-B
- Related: Toyota Yaris Cross (AC200); Toyota Avanza/Veloz (W100)

Powertrain
- Engine: Petrol: 1.2 L 3NR-VE I4 (NGC100); 1.3 L 1NR-VE I4 (NGC101); 1.5 L 2NR-VE I4 (NGC102); Petrol hybrid: 1.5 L 2NR-VEX I4 (NYC100)
- Electric motor: 1NM AC synchronous (hybrid)
- Transmission: 5-speed manual; CVT; eCVT (hybrid)
- Hybrid drivetrain: Power-split
- Battery: 0.7 kWh lithium-ion (hybrid)

Dimensions
- Wheelbase: 2,620 mm (103.1 in)
- Length: 4,410–4,425 mm (173.6–174.2 in)
- Width: 1,740 mm (68.5 in)
- Height: 1,480 mm (58.3 in)
- Kerb weight: 1,030–1,065 kg (2,271–2,348 lb); 1,155–1,165 kg (2,546–2,568 lb) (hybrid)

The fourth-generation Vios (designated AC100) debuted on 9 August 2022 in Thailand as the Yaris Ativ (the "Vios" nameplate had discontinued there). It is developed by Daihatsu through a joint Toyota-Daihatsu internal company known as Emerging-market Compact Car Company (ECC) under the lead of executive chief engineer Hideyuki Kamino.

The fourth-generation Vios is based on the DNGA-B platform shared with the W100 series Avanza/Veloz, although unlike any other Daihatsu-developed models, the Daihatsu-badged equivalency is not offered. The model is introduced with a 70 mm (2.8 in) longer wheelbase at 2,620 mm (103.1 in). Compared to its predecessor, the car features a fastback-like sloping rear roof section which stretched the window line further back.

Globally, Toyota builds the Vios or Yaris sedan in two countries, in Malaysia for the Malaysian market and in Thailand for the Thai and export markets. It is typically in 3 model grades, which in some countries are called base, E, and G. Power comes from either 1.2-litre (Thailand), 1.3-litre or 1.5-litre matched to 5-speed manual gearbox or a 7-speed simulated CVT. Electronic parking brake and rear disc brakes are standard on the High grade models. Depending on the countries, Toyota Safety Sense (TSS) is either standard or optional for the Mid and High grades.

The interior of the AC100 Vios/Yaris is made to be more premium in appearance than past Vios models, with many areas covered by soft touch materials and an optional 64-colour ambient lighting system (only available in higher grades). Other optional equipment in some markets include a 7-inch digital instrument cluster and a Pioneer-branded speakers (also only available in higher grades).

=== Hybrid ===
The first ever hybrid-powered Vios was first released in Thailand as the Yaris Ativ Hybrid. It is powered by 2NR-VEX engine coupled by an electric motor with a 0.76 kWh lithium-ion battery. The combined system produces 82 kW (111 PS; 110 hp) and 262 N⋅m (26.7 kg⋅m; 193 lb⋅ft) which is transmitted through an e-CVT gearbox. Coded NYC100, the Yaris Ativ Hybrid or Vios Hybrid features different styles of alloy wheels which are 5-lugs instead of 4-lugs on the petrol models to support the 120 kg (265 lb) increase in weight. The regular HEV model rides on 16-inch, while the GR Sport employs 17-inch alloy wheels.

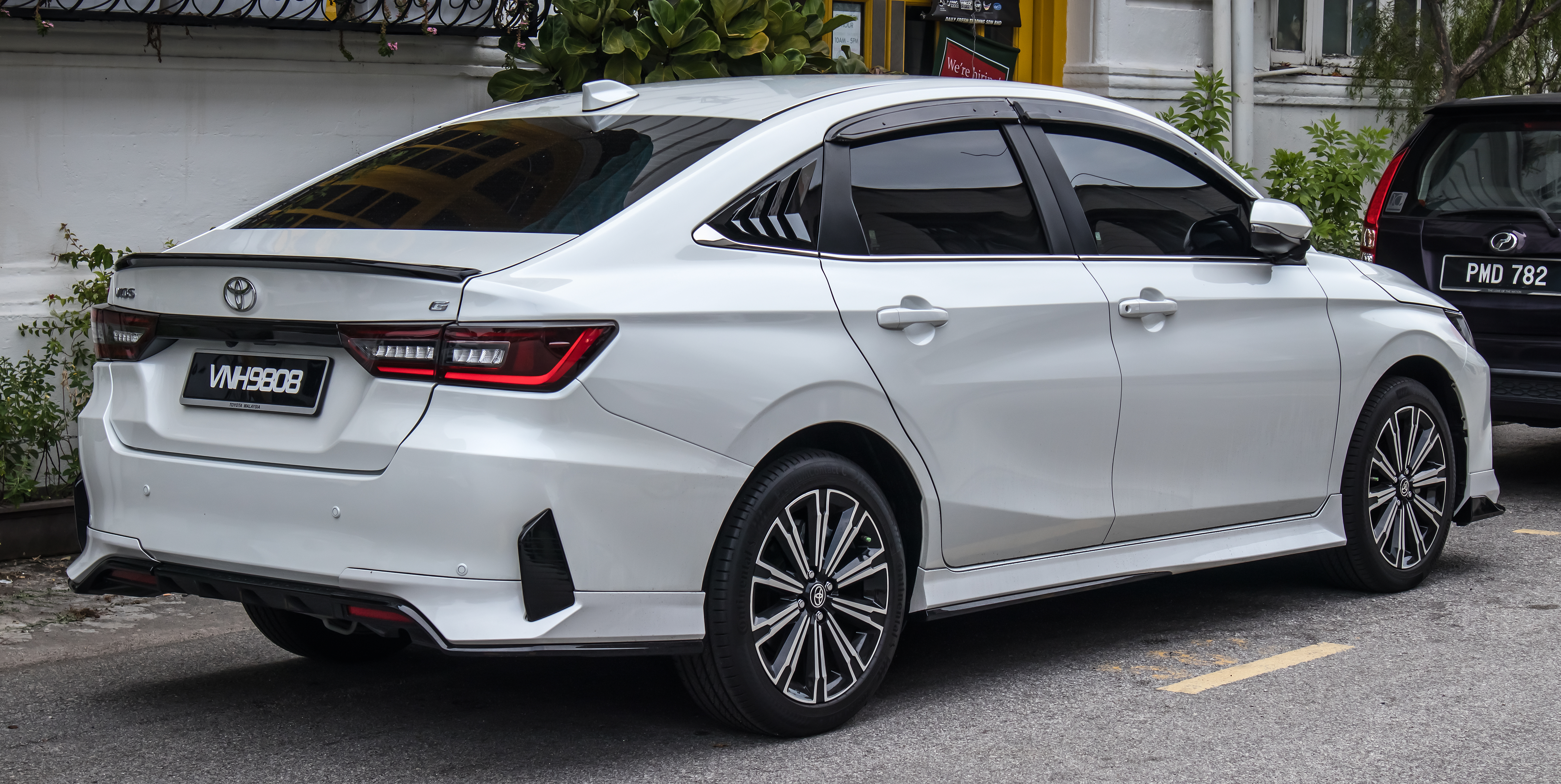
Rear view of Vios G (NGC102, Malaysia)

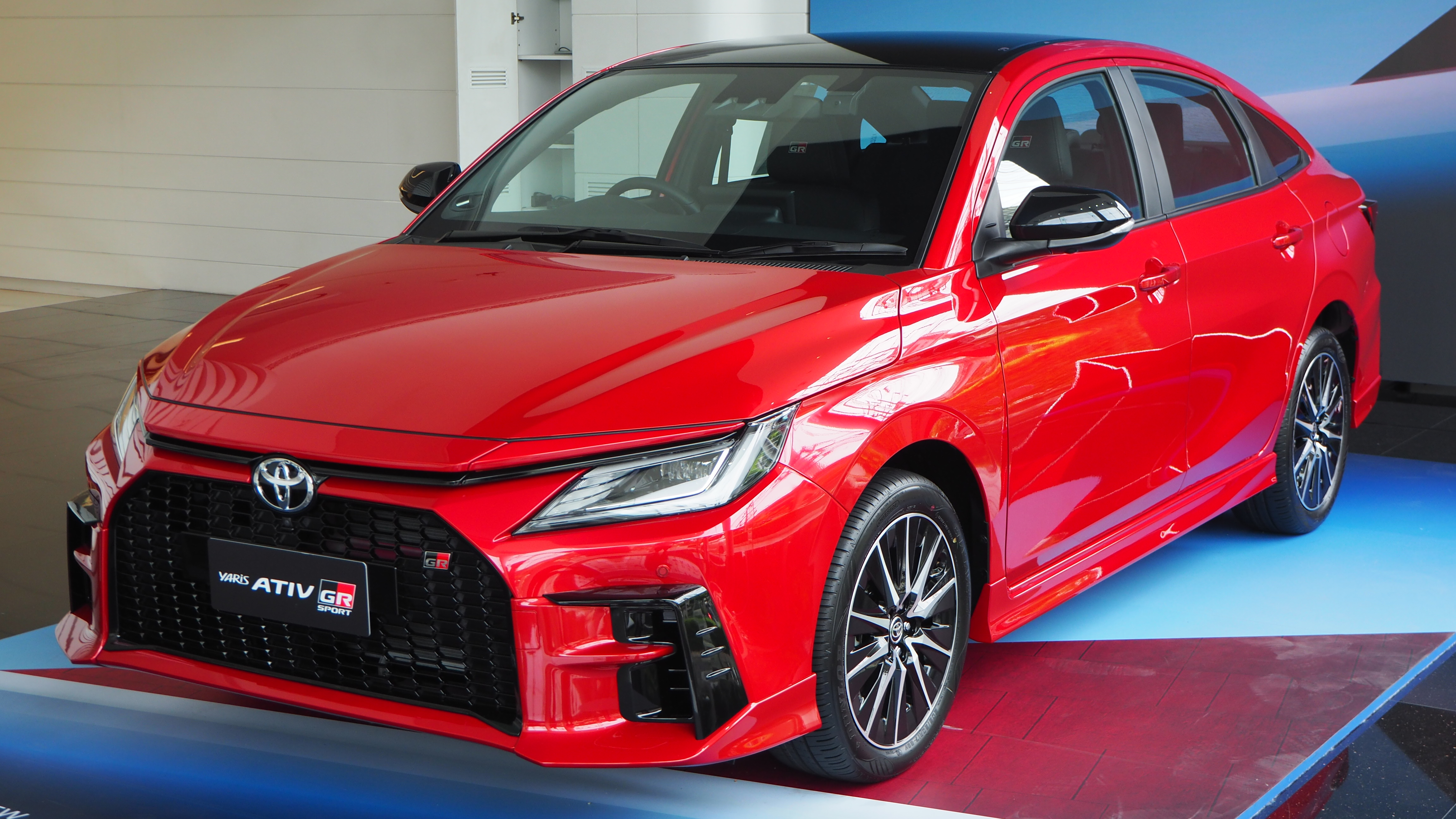
2025 Yaris Ativ Hybrid GR Sport (NYC100, Thailand)

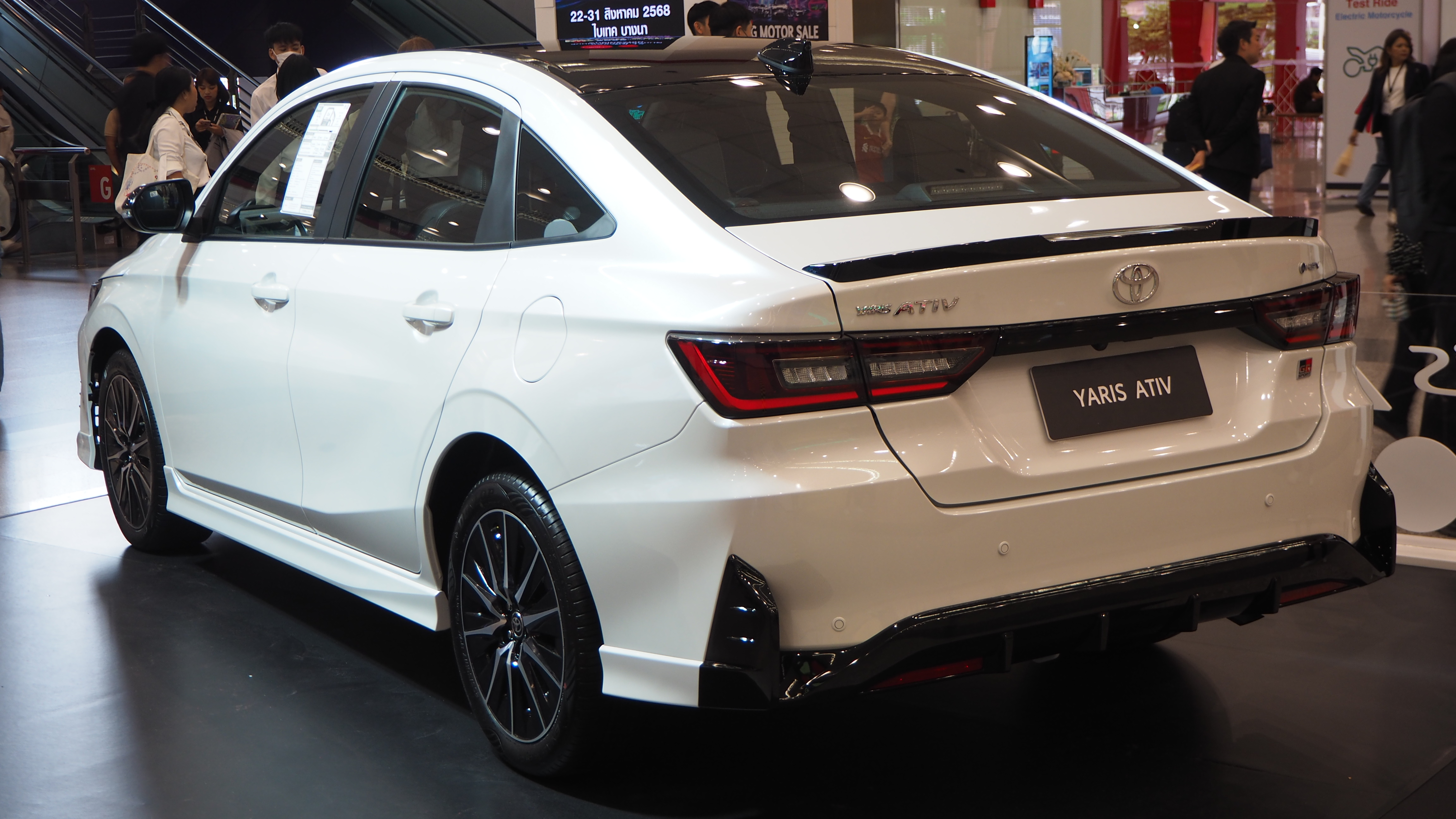
Yaris Ativ Hybrid GR Sport rear view

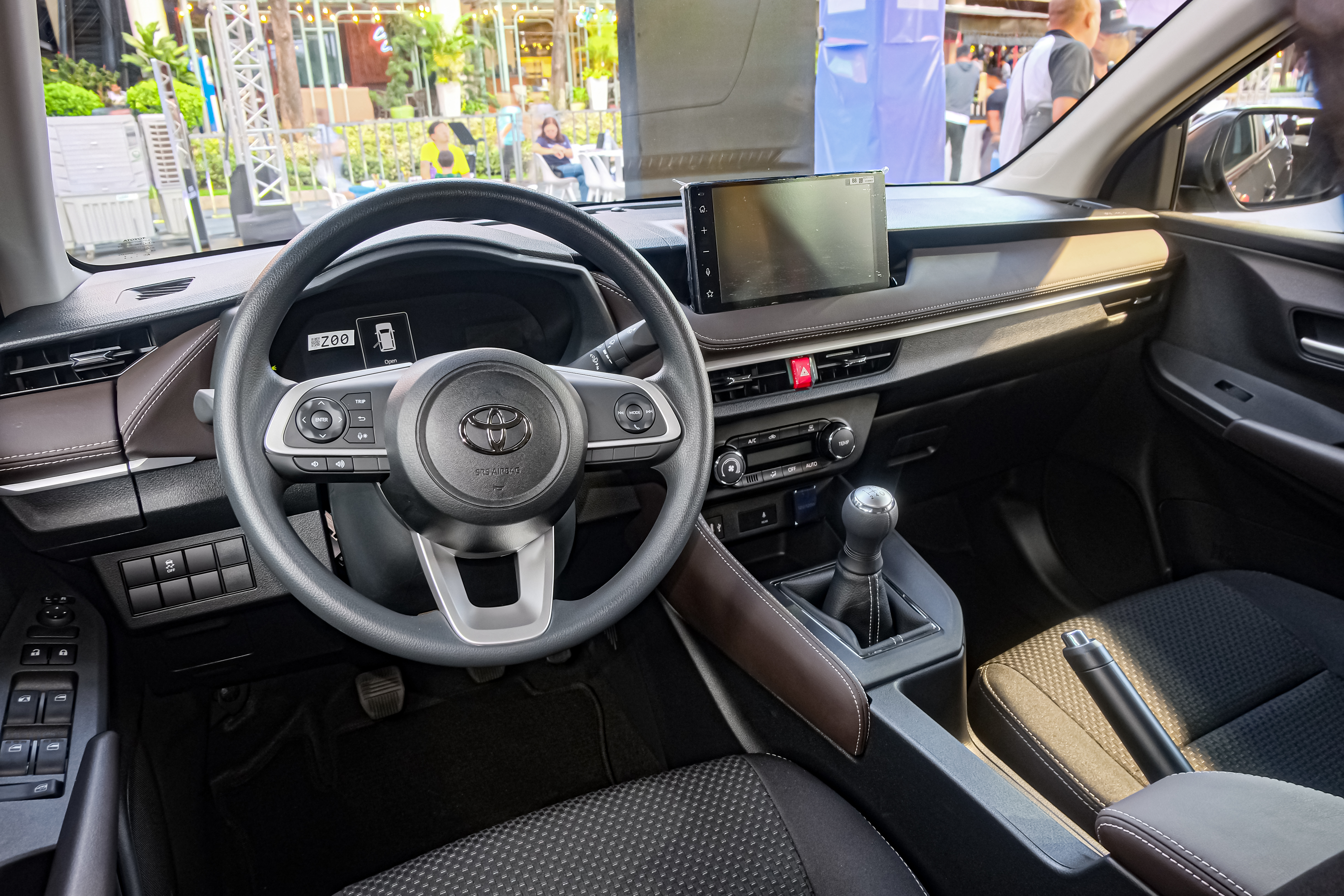
Interior

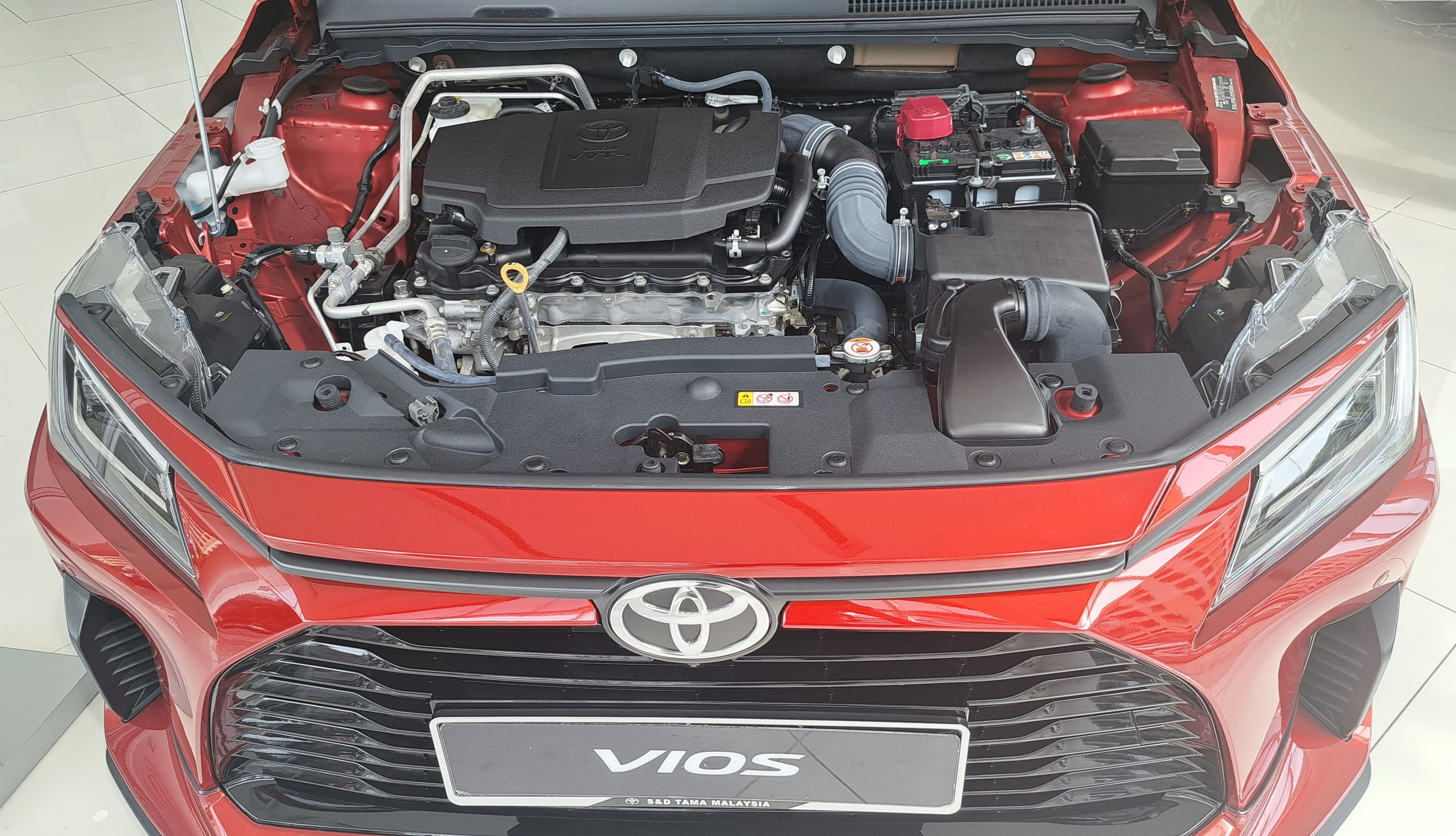
2NR-VE engine

=== Markets ===
==== Asia ====
===== Thailand =====
The Yaris Ativ in Thailand is available in four grades: Sport, Smart, Premium and Premium Luxury. Eligible under the Eco Car tax incentive program, it is equipped with the 1.2-litre 3NR-VE engine with Dual VVT-iE technology rated at 69 kW (94 PS; 93 hp) and 110 N⋅m (11.2 kg⋅m; 81.1 lb⋅ft), paired with a Toyota-made CVT gearbox marketed as Super CVT-i. Advanced driver-assistance systems package branded as Toyota Safety Sense is standard. The model also indirectly replaced the 1.5-litre Vios in the country.

Produced at the Gateway plant in Chachoengsao, sales figures target in Thailand is set at 3,500 units per month, with exports planned to over 35 countries.

The Yaris Ativ Hybrid was launched in Thailand on 21 August 2025, it is offered in two trim levels: GR Sport and Premium, with a 1.5-litre 2NR-VEX hybrid powertrain.

===== Laos =====
The fourth-generation Vios was launched in Laos on 1 September 2022, powered by the 1.3-litre 1NR-VE engine rated at 72 kW (98 PS; 97 hp) and 122 N⋅m (12.4 kg⋅m; 90.0 lb⋅ft). Toyota Safety Sense is standard for 1.3 Hi grade.

The Vios HEV was launched in Laos on 27 September 2025, it is offered in single trim with a 1.5-litre 2NR-VEX hybrid powertrain.

===== Cambodia =====
The fourth-generation Vios was released in Cambodia on 7 October 2022. It is only offered in Premium grade with the 1.3-litre 1NR-VE engine, paired with the CVT. Toyota Safety Sense is standard.

===== Indonesia =====
The fourth-generation Vios was launched in Indonesia on 12 October 2022, and is imported from Thailand instead of being assembled locally. It is powered by the 1.5-litre 2NR-VE engine rated at 78 kW (106 PS; 105 hp) and 138 N⋅m (14.1 kg⋅m; 102 lb⋅ft). It was initially available in two grade levels: E with 5-speed manual transmission and G with CVT; an optional Toyota Safety Sense package is available for the latter. The E grade was discontinued in September 2023. The HEV grade was introduced at the 33rd Indonesia International Motor Show on 5 February 2026.

===== Brunei =====
The Fourth-Generation Vios was launched in Brunei on 18 December 2022 and is imported from Thailand instead of Indonesia from previous generation. It is powered by the 1.3-litre 1NR-VE petrol engine mated to a CVT in a single grade.

The Vios in HEV variant was launched on 3 May 2026.

===== Malaysia =====
The fourth-generation Vios was launched in Malaysia on 20 March 2023. It is offered in two variants, 1.5 E (CVT) and 1.5 G (CVT) in five colour options with Spicy Scarlet being a new choice. Like the previous generation, the Malaysian Vios came with all-around lower body kits and boot spoiler. The new model is produced locally at Assembly Services Sdn Bhd (ASSB) in Bukit Raja, Klang.

The Vios HEV and HEV GR Sport grades were launched in Malaysia on 29 January 2026. The HEV versions receive an upgraded 10.1-inch display audio, compared to the petrol version's 9-inch unit. All models for the Malaysian market have all-around body kit. The Vios HEV features an HEV-exclusive front grille, while the GR Sport has an even more aggressive body kit with honeycomb grille insert. Inside, the GR Sport is also slightly different, with an all-black colour scheme, darker silver trim and a GR-branded steering wheel with gloss black spokes. The seats are exclusively trimmed in leather and suede, GR logo embroidered into the headrests. The Vios HEV runs on HEV-exclusive 16-inch alloy rims, while the GR Sport gets 17-inch GR Sport aero wheels.

===== Philippines =====
The fourth-generation Vios was previewed for the Philippine market on 2 October 2025 and launched on 24 October of that year, where it is marketed as the Toyota Ativ. The Vios nameplate has been dropped from new marketing materials so as to avoid confusion with the locally assembled, third generation 1NR-FE petrol-powered Vios which remains on sale. However, the Ativ retains the physical 'Vios' emblem. It is offered in three grade levels: 1.3 E with the 1NR-VE petrol engine paired with either 5-speed manual or CVT transmissions, 1.5 G with the 2NR-VE petrol engine paired with CVT transmission and 1.5 S HEV with 2NR-VEX hybrid powertrain paired with an E-CVT transmission. Toyota Safety Sense is standard on the S HEV grade. It is imported from Thailand instead of being locally produced.

===== Singapore =====
The Vios was reintroduced after 3 years hiatus and was unveiled at the 2026 Singapore Motor Show in January 2026. It is only available with a Hybrid powertrain on a single trim variant.

==== GCC ====
The model was introduced in GCC markets such as Saudi Arabia, Bahrain and the United Arab Emirates as the Yaris sedan in September 2022. Unlike the previous generation, the Yaris is imported from Thailand instead of Indonesia. The GCC market Yaris is powered by 1.3-litre 1NR-VE and 1.5-litre 2NR-VE petrol engines.

==== Latin America ====
In countries in the South America region, the fourth-generation Vios is marketed as the Yaris sedan. It is marketed with the 1.5-litre 2NR-VE engine as the standard powertrain.

===== Costa Rica =====
In Costa Rica, the fourth generation model was released on 10 October 2022. It is offered in New Line (manual and CVT) and Highline (CVT only) grade levels. Toyota Safety Sense is standard for Highline grade.

===== Mexico =====
In Mexico, the fourth generation model was released on 12 October 2022. It is offered in Base (manual and CVT), S (manual and CVT) and S Hi (CVT only) grade levels. Toyota Safety Sense is standard for S Hi grade.

===== Peru =====
In Peru, the fourth generation model was released on 2 November 2022. It is offered in Base (manual) and GLi (manual and CVT) grade levels, with LPG and CNG versions are also available as options.

===== Chile =====
In Chile, the fourth generation model was released in Chile on 15 March 2023. It is offered in I (manual) and E (manual and CVT) grade levels.

=== Side collision test manipulation ===
On 28 April 2023, Daihatsu confirmed that the company had committed "wrongdoings" in approval application for side collision tests under UN-R95 requirements for four vehicles, including the AC100 series Yaris Ativ / Vios which was developed by the company. According to Daihatsu, the inside lining of the front-seat door was improperly modified with a "notch" to prevent the part from breaking into pieces with sharp edges that could injure occupants during a side airbag deployment. These modifications are not present in production vehicles. 76,289 units of the model are affected, which are already sold in Thailand, GCC, Mexico, and others. In response, Toyota chairman Akio Toyoda and Toyota president Koji Sato publicly apologized.

According to Toyota, Daihatsu conducted an internal retest without the modification, and the car passed the test. Another retest was conducted on 28 April 2023. The car also passed this test, and was verified by an independent testing agency that was present during the test. However, Toyota suspended deliveries to Thailand until the vehicles are retested for the third time to satisfy a specific "witness testing" requirement in that market.

=== Recall ===
In February 2024, Toyota issued a recall notice for the AC100 Vios marketed in Indonesia and Malaysia. The vehicle received an improper tightening instruction on the nuts fixing the upper portions of the front shock absorbers, causing insufficient tightening torque of the nuts which lead to abnormal noises, the nuts may loosen or come off and resulting in vehicle damage posing risk to stability loss. A total of 505 units in Indonesia produced between June 2022 to August 2023 were affected.

=== Safety ===
In August 2023, the vehicle was tested for automotive safety by ASEAN NCAP. It received five stars out of a possible five.

ASEAN NCAP test results Toyota Vios (2023)
Test	Points
Overall:	5 /5 stars
Adult occupant:	35.25
Child occupant:	16.64
Safety assist:	16.08
Motorcyclist Safety:	10.73

TNCAP (1.0) test result Toyota Vios 'Classic' (2025, similar to Euro NCAP 2017)
Test	Points	%
Overall:	3/5 stars	
Adult occupant:	27.126	71%
Child occupant:	34.94	71%
Pedestrian:	28.047	66%
Safety assist:	3	25%

== Motorsports ==
The Vios is officially campaigned by Toyota for the One Make Race (OMR) in the Philippines, Malaysia, and previously in Thailand. Team Toyota Indonesia (TTI) also raced the first-generation Vios in the 2003—2005 Indonesian Touring Car Championship. It won the first season, before being replaced by the Yaris from 2006.

Since 2014, Toyota Motor Philippines (TMP) held the Vios Cup. Toyota Malaysia also hosted the similar Vios Challenge since 2017 as part of the Toyota Gazoo Racing (TGR) Festival.

In Malaysia, the Toyota GAZOO Racing (TGR) Festival, featuring the Vios Challenge started in August 2017 with the aim of cultivating young drivers to compete on and off track.

TMP offered the Vios NSP151 race car available for sale to the public. Based on the G model with manual transmission, the Vios race car is slightly modified from the production vehicle to improve performance. It has TRD clutch cover and disc, limited-slip-differential, upgraded muffler set, roll cage, Brembo sport brake pads, and OMP bucket seat with six-point seatbelts.

== Sales ==
Year	China		Taiwan	Thailand	Philippines	Vietnam	Malaysia (Note: Figures based on registration (Malaysia))	Indonesia (Note: Figures based on wholesale)	
Year	Saloon	Vios FS	Taiwan	Thailand	Philippines	Vietnam	Malaysia	Vios	Limo
2003							8,853		
2004	31,833		29,707	48,733	6,700	1,181	16,824		
2005	26,697		31,893	47,122	6,221	2,192	20,128		
2006	36,407		20,104	35,964	6,053	1,581	20,785	2,310	579
2007	39,395		12,129	45,032	8,717	2,112	22,752	5,474	2,660
2008	36,865		10,828	45,298	12,020	3,122	32,613	6,098	5,103
2009	42,675		16,012	49,510	11,990	5,141	29,444	2,722	4,576
2010	34,689		11,231	67,304	15,391	5,807	33,623	4,305	7,518
2011	13,303		12,116	61,985	14,979	5,401	29,850	2,525	6,850
2012	9,130		8,884	115,934	16,517	4,207	31,254	3,122	10,938
2013	28,616		8,369	108,937	20,493	5,140	26,898	3,115	9,582
2014	127,827			47,800	25,837	9,187	42,091	2,214	6,697
2015	114,467			35,539	33,173	13,761	33,749	1,414	4,883
2016	117,041			21,180	36,256	17,561	25,224	1,077	2,320
2017	93,626	35,336		19,198	36,734	22,260	23,158	746	0
2018	62,731	34,686		9,311	25,840	27,085	19,119	703	0
2019	58,332	26,029			33,181	27,258	23,063	502	2
2020	53,594	22,135		4,046	25,290	30,251	20,549	309	
2021	52,993	21,410		3,929	35,095	19,931	22,052	1,243	
2022				2,103	34,465	23,529	23,622	250	
2023	19,993	8,430			37,971	13,521	24,553	570	
2024	4	2			43,636	14,210	28,667	153	
2025							31,776	106	

Notes: The sales data above only apply to models sold under the Toyota Vios nameplate (except for Thailand, 2004–2007 which include Toyota Soluna Vios and Indonesia which include Toyota Limo).
The Toyota Soluna, Toyota Yaris Sedan, Toyota Yaris Ativ and Toyota Belta nameplates are not included.
