= Limo =

Limo may refer to:

- Limousine, a luxury car
- Limo (woreda), an administrative division in southern Ethiopia
- Limo, Depok, a district of Depok, West Java, Indonesia
- Limo, Les Anglais, Haiti, a village in the Les Anglais commune of Haiti
- LiMo Platform, a mobile phone and device operating system
- LiMo Foundation, the organization that develops the LiMo Platform
- Limo, Ghana, a community in Kumbungu District in the Northern Region of Ghana
- Toyota Limo, a taxicab offered by Toyota in Southeast Asian markets

People

- Limo (name), a Kalenjin name common in Kenya
- Benjamin Limo (born 1974), Kenyan long-distance runner and 2005 World Champion over 5000 metres
- Felix Limo (born 1980), Kenyan long-distance runner and Chicago and London marathon winner
- Philemon Limo (born 1985), Kenyan long-distance runner competing in 10K races
- Remmy Limo (born 1971), Kenyan triple jumper
- Richard Limo (born 1980, a Kenyan long-distance runner and 2001 World Champion over 5000 metres

== See also ==
- Limos, a Greek goddess
- The Limo (disambiguation)
