= LiMo =

LiMo may refer to:

- LiMo Foundation, an organisation developing a mobile phone platform, the LiMo Platform.
- LiMo Platform, a mobile phone platform developed by the LiMo Foundation.

== See also ==
- Limo (disambiguation)
