= Toyota Limo =

Series of automobile designed for taxicab use by Toyota

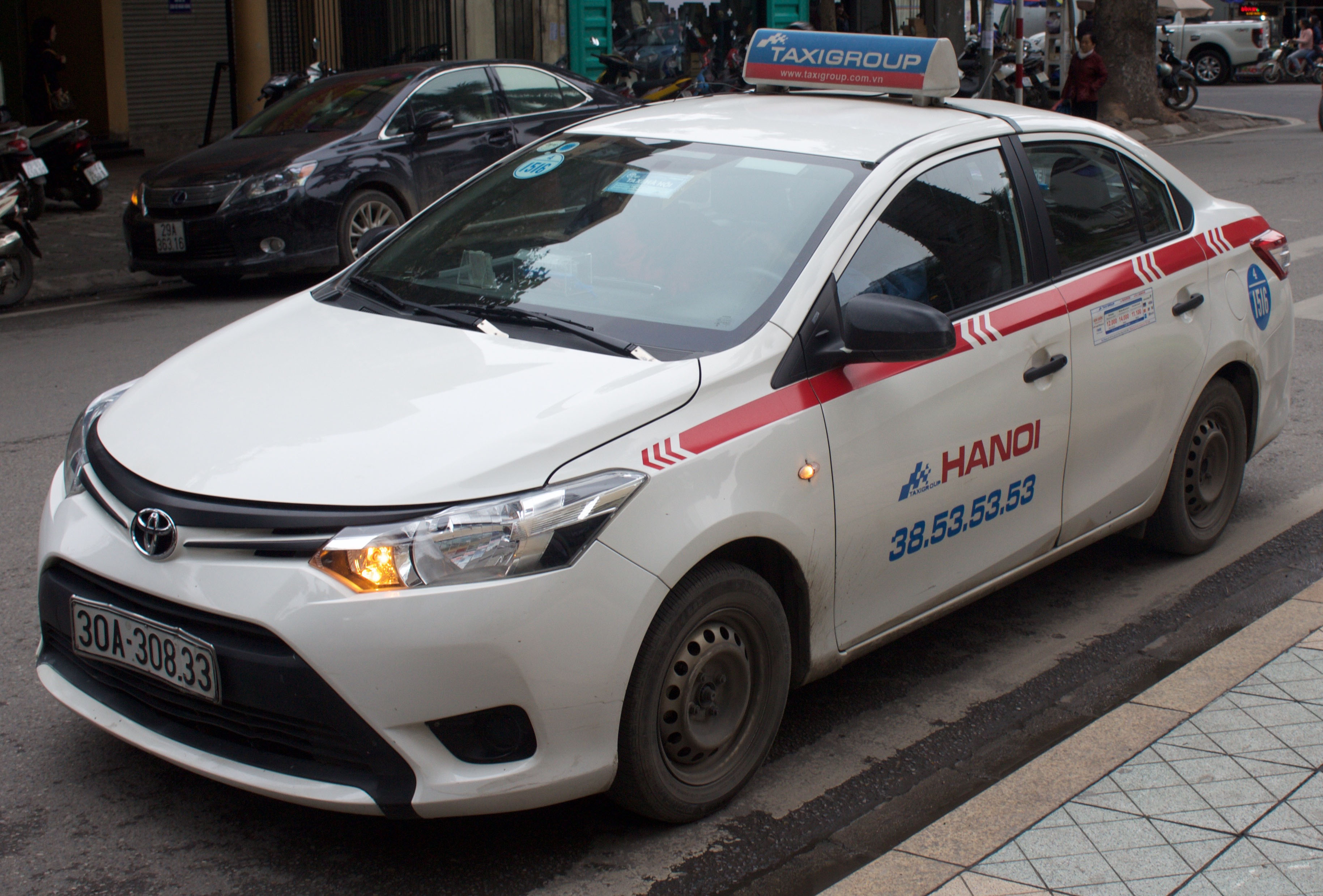
Toyota Limo taxi (NCP150, Vietnam)

The Toyota Limo is an automobile nameplate used by the Japanese automaker Toyota for two different fleet-themed vehicles, primarily for the Southeast Asian markets: a Vios-derived subcompact car (2003–2016, primarily offered in Indonesia and Vietnam), and a Corolla-derived compact car (2003–present, primarily offered in Thailand).

Both cars are essentially scaled-down variants of its respective base models designed specifically for taxi fleet, retaining the same engine options from either the two, but with a specially tuned ECU for more fuel efficient and economical use and softer suspension for comfort, while lacking any extra equipment. The result of which was a robust low maintenance cost, with longer service intervals that may be yearly or every 100,000 kilometres (62,000 miles).

== Vios-based Limo ==
The Vios-based Limo is primarily offered and commonly used as taxicabs by various taxi firms in Indonesia and Vietnam.

In Indonesia, the Vios-based Limo replaces the XLi trim of the Soluna, the Southeast Asian variant of the Tercel, and is only powered by the 1.5-litre 1NZ-FE petrol engine. Orders were stopped in 2016, when Toyota started offering the Transmover, a fleet variant of the Avanza MPV.

- NCP42 (2003)
- NCP93 (2007)
- NCP150 (2013)
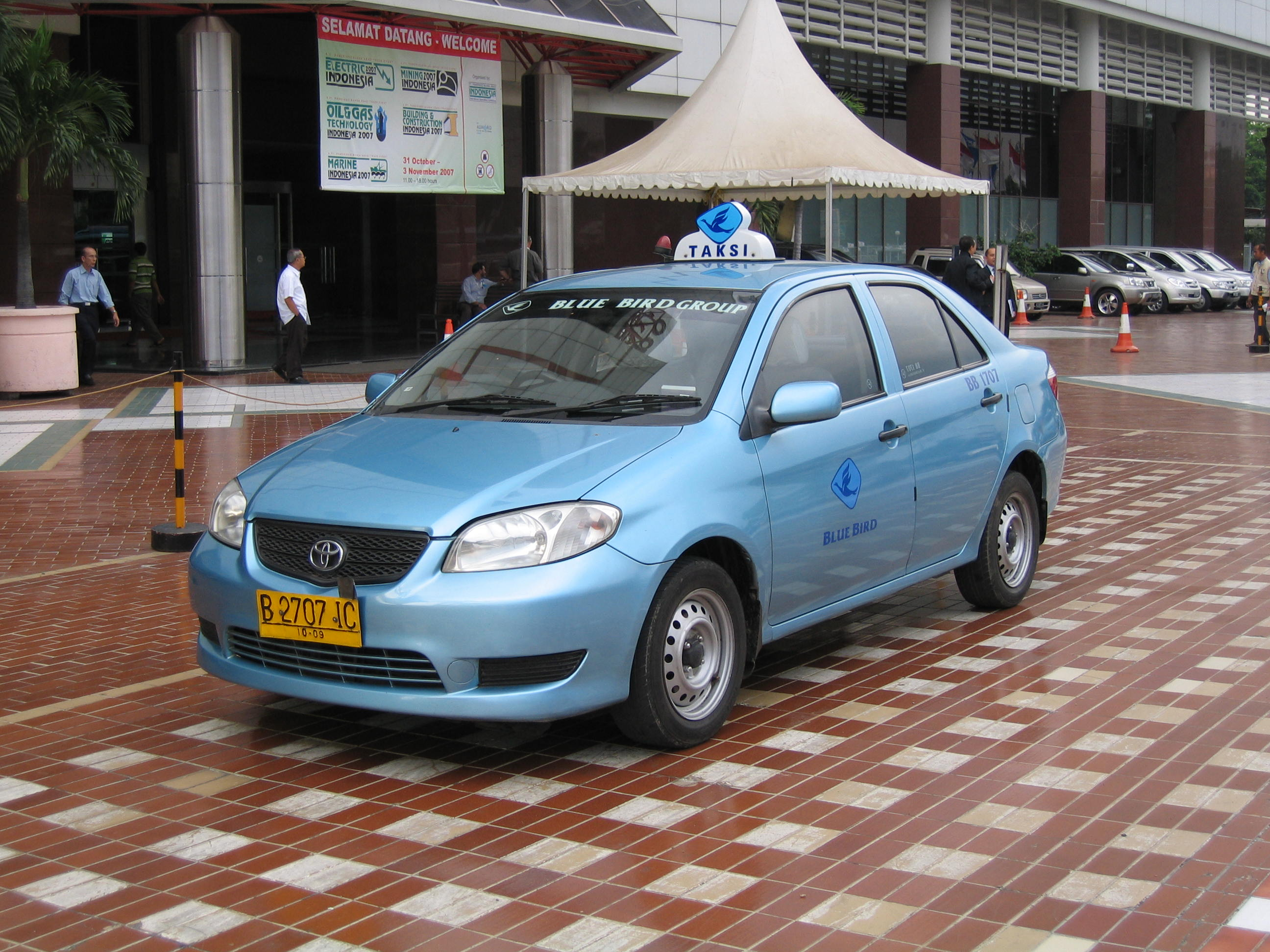
Toyota Limo taxi (NCP42, Indonesia)

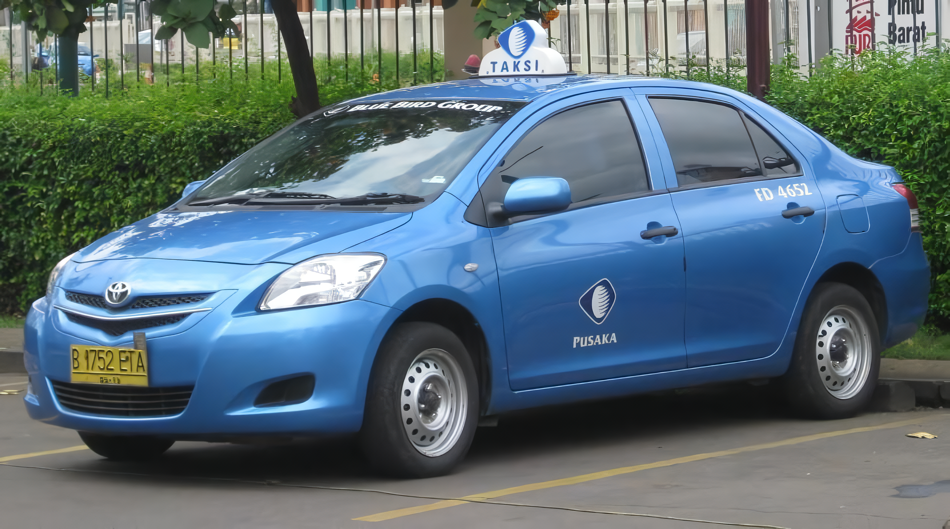
Toyota Limo taxi (NCP93, Indonesia)

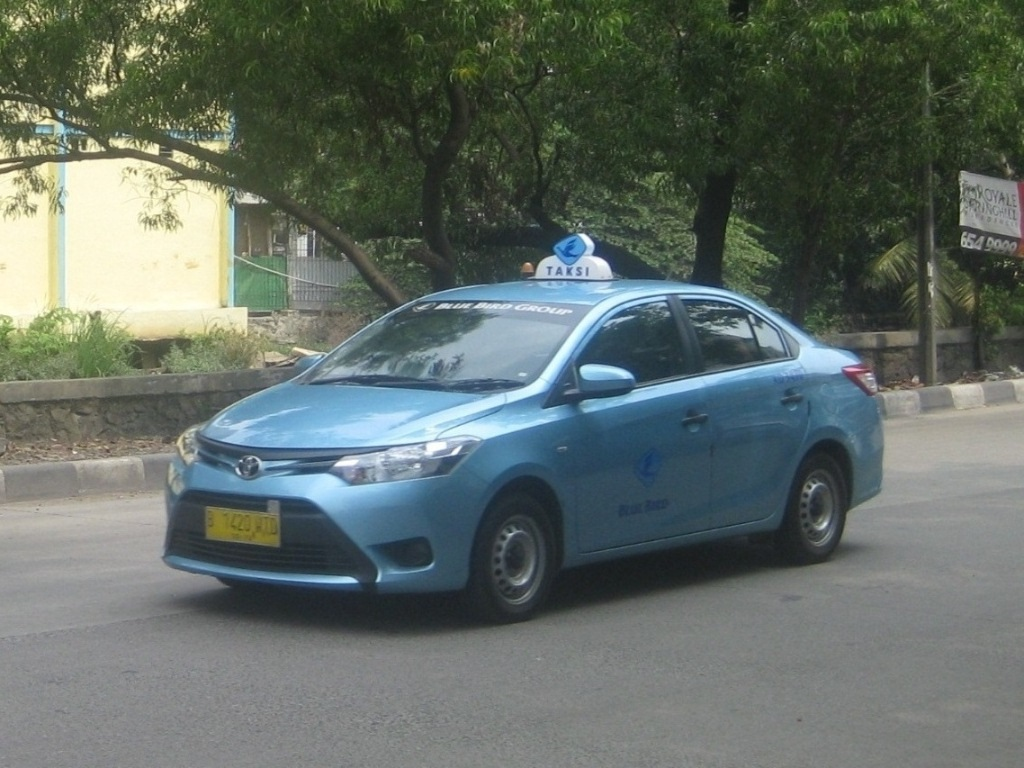
Toyota Limo taxi (NCP150, Indonesia)

== Corolla-based Limo ==
The Corolla-based Limo is primarily offered and commonly used as taxicabs in Thailand.

- E120 (2003)
- E140 (2008)
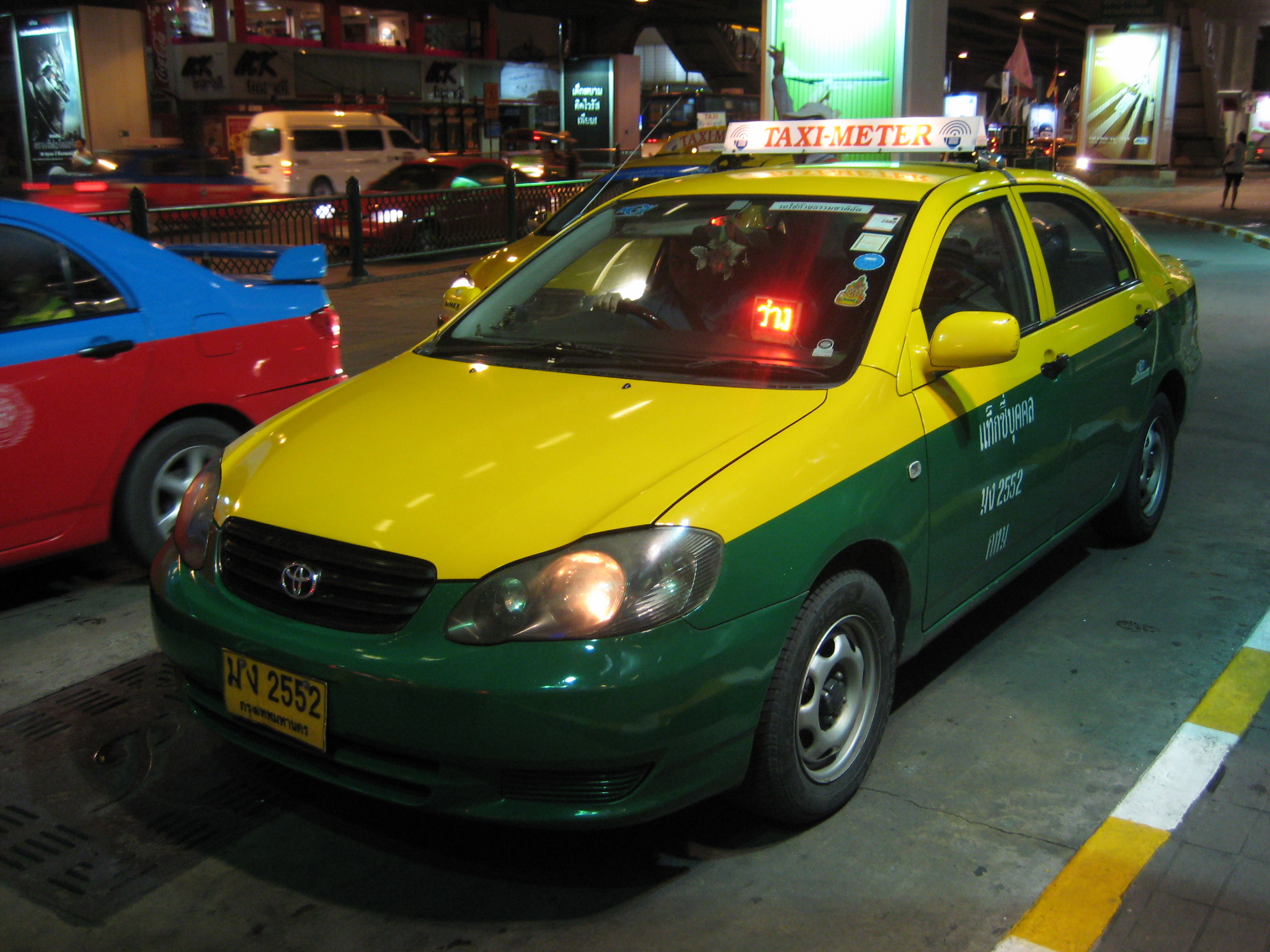
Toyota Limo taxi (E120, Thailand)

== See also ==
- Toyota Comfort and Toyota JPN Taxi, similarly designed vehicles for the Japanese market.
