= Chelimo =

Chelimo, also Jelimo, is a surname of Kenyan origin meaning "born in the morning - when cows are going out to pasture" (Chep- + Limo).

It may refer to:

Chelimo

- Elijah Chelimo Kipterege (born 1987), Kenyan steeplechase runner
- Nicholas Chelimo (born 1983), Kenyan professional marathon runner
- Paul Chelimo (born 1990), Kenyan-born American long-distance track runner
- Richard Chelimo (1972–2001), Kenyan long-distance track runner and Olympic medallist
- Rose Chelimo (born 1989), Kenyan-born Bahraini long-distance runner and 2017 world champion

Jelimo

- Pamela Jelimo (born 1989), Kenyan middle-distance runner and 2008 Olympic champion

== See also ==
- Kiplimo, related name meaning "son of Limo"
