= Toyota W transmission =

Family of RWD/4WD transmissions built by Aisin

Toyota Motor Corporation's W family is a family of RWD/4WD transmissions built by Aisin. Physically, these transmissions have much in common (like the bell housing-to-body bolt pattern) with other Aisin-built transmissions, like the Jeep AX-5 and the Toyota G-series. The W55, W56, W57, W58, and W59 are externally and internally very similar aside from the gear ratios.

== W40 ==
4-speed transmission offered in base model vehicles in the 1970s. Often referred to as a Celica or Corona steel case 4-speed. The housing is steel as opposed to aluminium in later W series boxes.

Ratios:

- First Gear: 3.287:1
- Second Gear: 2.043:1
- Third Gear: 1.394:1
- Fourth Gear: 1.00:1
- Reverse: 4.091:1

Applications (calendar years):

- 1971–1976 Toyota Celica (A20)
- 1970s Toyota Corona up to the *T132 chassis

== W42 ==
4-speed transmission.

Ratios:

- First Gear: 3.579:1
- Second Gear: 2.081:1
- Third Gear: 1.397:1
- Fourth Gear: 1.000:1
- Reverse: 4.399:1

Applications (calendar years):

- 1980s Toyota Hilux (aka Pickup)
- Toyota Crown RS60

== W45 ==
The W45 is a 4-speed variant of the W55 alloy case box. It replaced the steel case W40 around Oct 1980. It also came as a stock transmission in some of the 1981 base model Toyota RWD pickups.

The W45 case was made of aluminium alloy.

Ratios:

- First Gear: 3.566:1
- Second Gear: 2.056:1
- Third Gear: 1.384:1
- Fourth Gear: 1.00:1
- Reverse: 4.091:1

Applications (calendar years): 1980~ RWD Toyota Cars

- 1981 Toyota Hilux (2WD only)
- 1980–1982 TX60 13T-U Chaser (Japan)
- 1980–1982 TX76 13T-U Cressida wagon (Japan)
- 1980–1982 TX50 13T-U Cresta (jdm)

== W46 ==
Longitudinal 4-Speed Transmission

Ratios:

- First Gear: 3.954
- Second Gear: 2.141
- Third Gear: 1.384
- Fourth Gear: 1.000
- Reverse: 4.091

Applications:

- 1990- Toyota Pickup 22R-E RWD

== W50 ==
Often called the "steel-case" transmission for its steel shell, in contrast to the later W-series transmissions' aluminium case. This transmission is mostly associated with early Celicas of the 1970s. It is also shorter from the bellhousing face to the transmission mount than the later aluminium case W-series transmissions, despite using the same mount.

Ratios:

- First Gear: 3.287:1
- Second Gear: 2.043:1
- Third Gear: 1.394:1
- Fourth Gear: 1.00:1
- Fifth Gear: 0.853:1
- Reverse: 4.039:1

Applications (calendar years):

- 1973–1981 Toyota Celica
- 1974–1981 Toyota Carina
- 1973–1981 Toyota Corona
- 1979–1981 Toyota Supra
- 1976–1982 Toyota Hilux (RWD only)
- 1979-1984 Toyota Crown

== W51 ==
Came in early 1980s CE71 Corolla wagon. Similar ratios as W52 except 5th

Composition is alloy.

Ratios:

- First gear: 3.625
- Second gear: 2.043
- Third gear: 1.394
- Fourth gear: 1.000
- Fifth gear: 0.802
- Reverse: 4.039

Applications (calendar years):

- Toyota Corolla CE71/CE72 wagon behind 1839 cc 1C diesel engine (Japan).

== W52 ==
Used in Australian delivered 2WD SR5 Extra-Cab Hilux (YN57)

Composition is steel.

Ratios:

- First Gear: 3.625:1
- Second Gear: 2.043:1
- Third Gear: 1.394:1
- Fourth Gear: 1.00:1
- Fifth Gear: 0.853:1
- Reverse: 4.039:1

Applications (calendar years): 1984–1988 2WD Hilux (AU)

== W55 ==
This was the first of the aluminium-cased W-series transmissions. The W55 replaced the steel-cased W50, reducing the vehicle weight by 10 kg. It features mostly in 4 cylinder powered vehicles.

Ratios:

- First Gear: 3.566:1
- Second Gear: 2.056:1
- Third Gear: 1.384:1
- Fourth Gear: 1.000:1
- Fifth Gear: 0.850:1
- Reverse: 4.091:1

Applications (calendar years):

- 1982–1983 Toyota Carina (A60)
- 1981–1985 Toyota Celica (A60)
- 1983 Toyota Corona
- 1981-1984 Toyota Cressida (X60) with R-series engines (Europe)
- 1986 Toyota Crown
- 1995-2004 Toyota Crown Comfort
- 1983 Toyota Chaser/Mark II/Cresta
- 1983–1995 Toyota Hilux/Pickup 2WD with 22R or 22R-E engine
- 2001–2005 Lexus IS 300 (JCE10) (US market only)

== W56 ==
A common truck transmission that came in 2-wheel and 4-wheel drive varieties.

Its ratios differ in comparison to the base W55 in the 1st and 2nd gears only; this is to allow a slightly heavier vehicle (truck) to get up to speed slightly quicker than if geared like a car.

This was most likely accomplished by taking the W55 base gears and changing the 1st and 2nd gear sets, as the rest of the transmission remains unchanged.

Marlin Czajkowski, owner and CEO of Toyota-specific California-based rock crawling company Marlin Crawler, Inc., invented and popularized an A-through-E nomenclature system for 1985–1995 USA-market W56 transmissions. These include the W56-A (1985), W56-B (1986–88), W56-C (1989–91), W56-D (1992), and W56-E (1993–95) variants of 4WD Toyota Hilux Pickup and 4Runner W56 transmissions. This system is used to distinguish between the five major design changes Marlin has identified throughout this year span. Diesel powered sedans and station wagons featured the W56 as well as some commercial class vehicles such as the Cressida 4 cylinder models.

Ratios:

- First Gear: 3.954:1
- Second Gear: 2.141:1
- Third Gear: 1.384:1
- Fourth Gear: 1.000:1
- Fifth Gear: 0.850:1
- Reverse: 4.091:1

Applications (calendar years):

- Toyota Hilux with 22R-E engine
- Toyota 4Runner with 22R-E engine
- Toyota T100
- Toyota Cressida
- Toyota Crown
- Toyota Crown Comfort
- Toyota Cresta (Non-JZ Models)
- Toyota Mark II (Non-JZ Models)
- Toyota Chaser (Non-JZ Models)

== W57 ==
The W57 is sometimes designated as a "close-ratio transmission"; however in its stock form it does not meet all the criteria for a Close-ratio box.

The ratio shift was accomplished by taking the W55 base ratios and changing the input shaft to intermediate shaft ratio by 7.9%, thus shifting 1, 2, 3 ratios higher by that amount (4th is direct 1:1).

Unlike in the W58 the 5th/overdrive gear set was changed to create a smaller rpm drop between 4th & 5th gears so as to remain close to the overdrive ratio seen in the other boxes.

The rest of the transmission remains unchanged.

Ratios:

- First Gear: 3.285:1
- Second Gear: 1.894:1
- Third Gear: 1.275:1
- Fourth Gear: 1.00:1
- Fifth Gear: 0.861:1
- Reverse: 3.768:1

Applications (calendar years):

- 1983–1986 Toyota Supra MK 2 in certain non-US markets.
- 1986 Toyota Crown
- 1986 Toyota Cressida
- 1982–1985 Toyota Celica (A60) with 21R engine
- 1999-2006 Toyota Crown Comfort (LXS12)
- 1983-2001 Toyota Chaser/Cresta/Mark II (SX80,90,100/GX60,70,80,90,100/LX80,90,100)

== W58 ==
It differs from the W57 in its fifth-gear ratio. This transmission is popular as a replacement for weak stock transmissions in other vehicles. It came in two varieties: the original found in the 1982–1989 non-turbo Supras, Celicas and Cressidas of the early 1980s; and the later version found in Mk3, Mk 4 Supras and Lexus SC 300s.

Toyota lists a change from an alloy sandwich plate to a steel sandwich plate around 1989. The steel sandwich plate has some minor internal differences, and it is believed to be slightly stronger (some wider bearings, some wider gears, slightly different gear selection mechanism, etc.).

In theory the all-alloy version of the W58 should be exactly the same strength as any other all-alloy W-Series transmission. The steel plate version is considered much harder to find and worth approximately three to five times as much as an all alloy version.

The ratios and bolt patterns remain the same regardless of the sandwich plate used.

The W58 & W57 share the highest gearing and closest ratios (1st, 2nd, 3rd, and 4th (direct)) of the stock W-Series transmissions.

The ratio shift was accomplished by taking the W55 base ratios and changing the input shaft to intermediate shaft ratio by 7.9%, thus shifting 1, 2, 3 ratios higher by that amount. This also shifted the overdrive 5th gear higher by the same amount creating a wider and taller overdrive ratio.

The W58 is sometimes designated as a "close-ratio transmission"; however, in its stock form it does not meet all the criteria for a close-ratio box.

Toyota engineers have shown favor to the W58 over the rest of the 'W' series by including it in so many models and even building a stronger version for higher powered applications.

Ratios:

- First Gear: 3.285:1
- Second Gear: 1.894:1
- Third Gear: 1.275:1
- Fourth Gear: 1.00:1
- Fifth Gear: 0.783:1
- Reverse: 3.768:1

Applications (calendar years):

- 1982–1985 Toyota Celica (US)
- 1981–1986 Toyota Supra (A60)
- 1986–1992 Toyota Supra (A70) non-turbo
- 1993–1998 Toyota Supra (A80) non-turbo
- 1986 Toyota Cressida (X70)
- 1986 Toyota Soarer (Z20)
- 1982–1992 Lotus Excel
- 1992–1997 Lexus SC300

== W59 ==
A common truck transmission, this was the successor to the W56. Like the W56, it came in both 2-wheel and 4-wheel drive versions.

This model appears to have a combination of ratios used in older models of the W-series.

- 1st and 2nd are low ratios like in the W56 for use to get a heavy vehicle moving.
- 3rd ratio is the same as in the W57/W58 for a lower rpm drop between 3rd & 4th useful in high-speed acceleration.
- 4th is direct 1:1 as per design in these boxes.
- 5th seems to be the base W55 overdrive ratio.

Ratios:

- First Gear: 3.954:1
- Second Gear: 2.141:1
- Third Gear: 1.384:1
- Fourth Gear: 1.00:1
- Fifth Gear: 0.81:1

Applications (calendar years):

- Toyota 4Runner
- Toyota Tacoma
  - US model (January 1995–September 2004) with 2RZ-FE engine
- Toyota T100

== See also ==
- Toyota P transmission
