= Vehicle for hire =

Vehicle providing transport for a fee

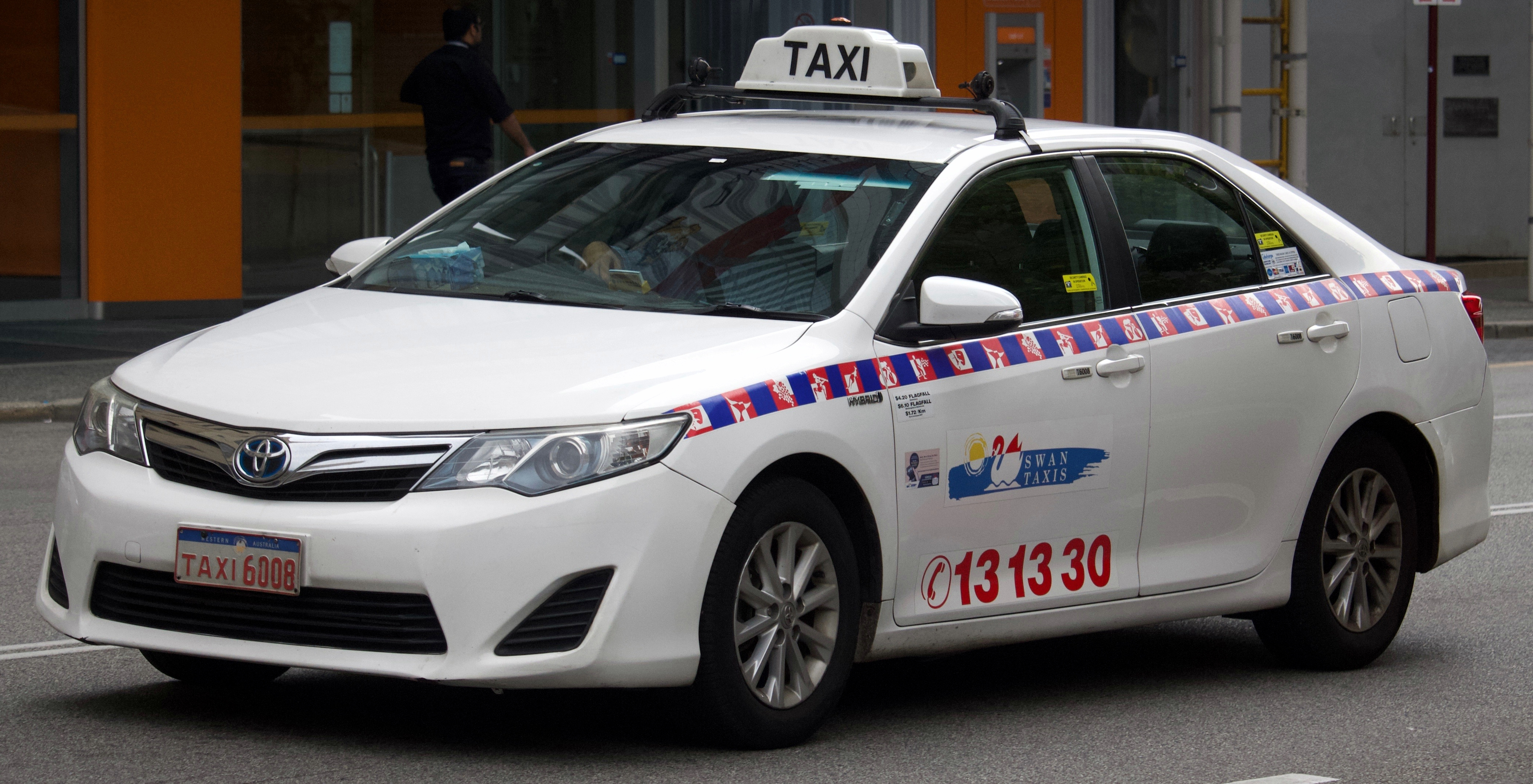
Taxicab in Perth

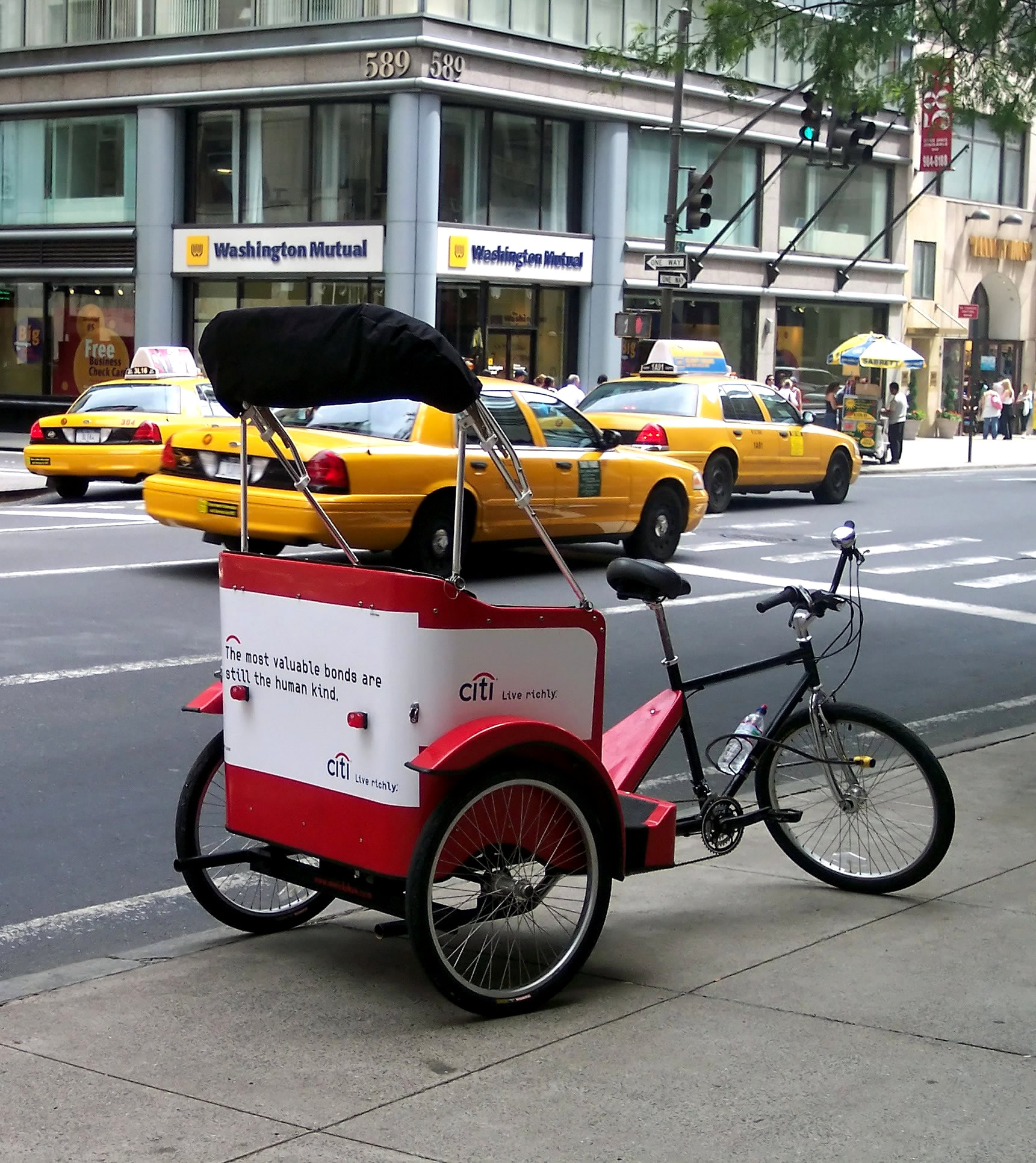
Cycle rickshaw in New York City

A vehicle for hire is a vehicle providing private transport or shared transport for a fee, in which passengers are generally free to choose their points or approximate points of origin and destination, unlike public transport, and which they do not drive themselves, as in car rental and carsharing. They may be offered via a ridesharing company.

== Vehicles ==
Vehicles for hire include taxicabs pulled rickshaws, cycle rickshaws, auto rickshaws, motorcycle taxis, Zémidjans, okadas, boda bodas, sedan services, limousines, party buses, carriages (including hackney carriages, fiacres, and caleches), pet taxis, water taxis, and air charters.

Share taxis, paratransit, dollar vans, marshrutkas, dolmuş, nanny vans, demand responsive transport, public light buses, and airport buses operate along fixed routes, but offer some flexibility in the point of origin and/or destination.

== Notable companies ==
Some of the largest vehicle for hire companies include Uber, Ola Cabs, Bolt, DiDi, and Grab.
