= Kiplimo =

Kiplimo is a name of Kenyan origin that stems from the name Limo and the prefix Kip-, meaning "son of". Kiplimo is a Kalenjin name that means, "When cows are just about to go and graze". It may refer to:

== Given name ==
- Kiplimo Kimutai (born 1981), Kenyan half marathon runner

== Surname ==
- Abraham Kiplimo (born 1989), Ugandan Olympic long-distance runner
- Jacob Kiplimo (born 2000), Ugandan Olympic long-distance runner and Junior World Cross Country winner
- Jonathan Kiplimo Maiyo (born 1988), Kenyan long-distance track and marathon runner
- Joseph Kitur Kiplimo (born 1988), Kenyan long-distance track runner
- Nixon Kiplimo Chepseba (born 1990), Kenyan 1500 metres runner and 2011 Diamond League winner
- Samuel Kiplimo Kosgei (born 1986), Kenyan road runner and former world record holder over 25K
- Paul Kiplimo Boit (born 1906), President Moi era politician and prominent farmer from Uasin Gishu County, Kenya.
