= Toyota Comfort =

Mid-size sedan

Toyota Comfort (XS10)
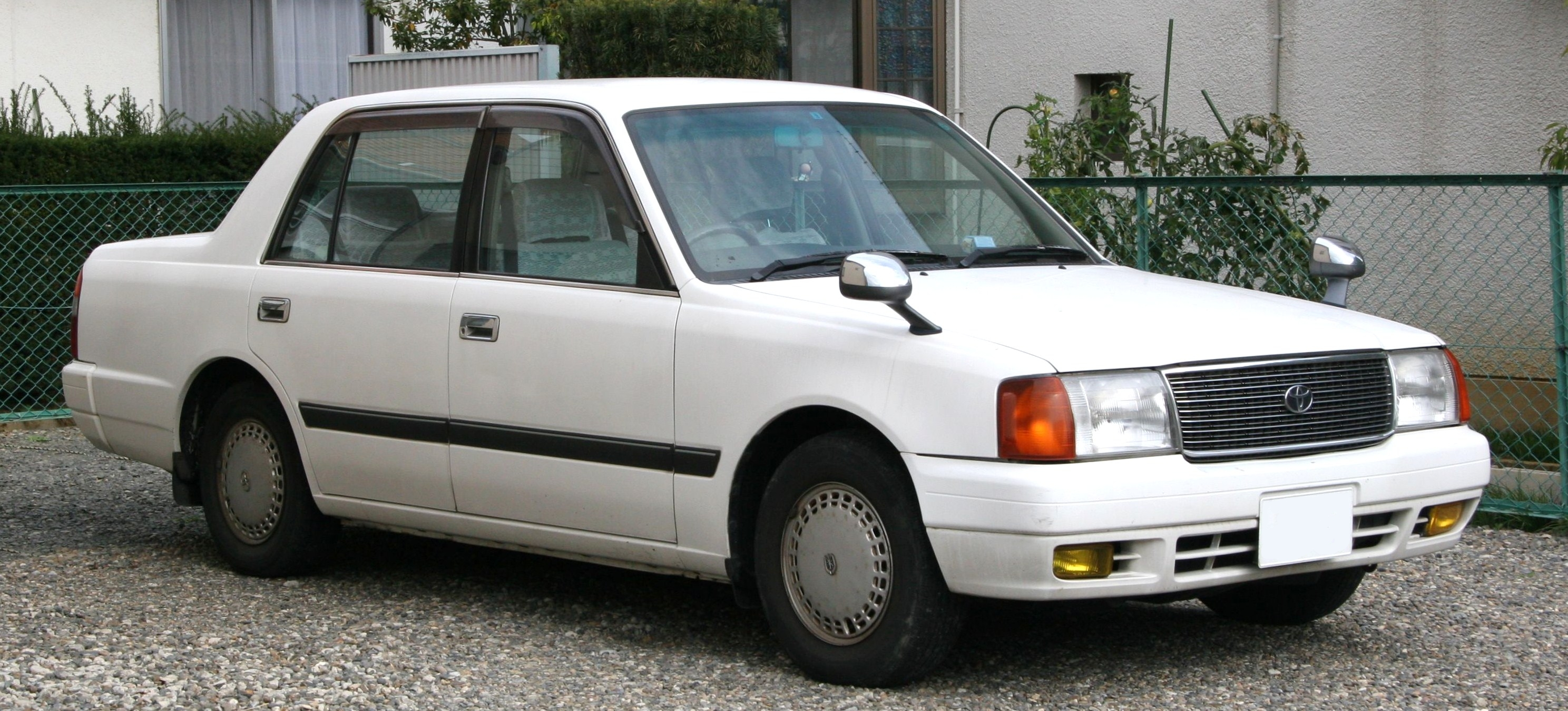

Overview
- Manufacturer: Toyota
- Also called: Toyota Crown Comfort; Toyota Crown Sedan
- Production: December 1995–January 2018
- Assembly: Japan: Susono, Shizuoka (Higashi Fuji plant)

Body and chassis
- Class: Mid-size car (D)
- Body style: 4-door notchback sedan
- Layout: Front-engine, rear-wheel-drive
- Related: Toyota Mark II (X80)

Powertrain
- Engine: Petrol: 1.8 L 4S-FE I4 (SXS11); 2.0 L 3S-FE I4 (SXS13); 2.0 L 3S-FE SC I4 (SXS13); 2.0 L 1TR-FE I4 (TSS13); 2.0 L 1G-FE DOHC I6 (GBS/GXS12); LPG: 2.0 L 3Y-PE OHV I4 (YXS10/11); 2.0 L 1TR-FPE I4 (TSS10/11); 2.0 L 1G-GPE DOHC I6 (GXS10); Diesel: 2.4 L 2L-II I4 (LXS10); 2.4 L 2L-TE turbo I4 (LXS11); 3.0 L 5L I4 (LXS12)
- Electric motor: 4 hp (3.0 kW; 4.1 PS) 1GM belted alternator starter (GBS12)
- Transmission: 4-speed A340E automatic; 4-speed A42D automatic; 4-speed A43D automatic; 4-speed N45 manual; 5-speed W55 manual; 5-speed W56 manual; 5-speed W57 manual
- Hybrid drivetrain: Mild hybrid (THS-M) (GBS12)
- Battery: 36 V Lead-acid (GBS12)

Dimensions
- Wheelbase: 2,680 mm (105.5 in); 2,785 mm (109.6 in) (LWB)
- Length: 4,590 mm (180.7 in); 4,695 mm (184.8 in) (LWB)
- Width: 1,695 mm (66.7 in)
- Height: 1,525 mm (60.0 in)

Chronology
- Predecessor: Toyota Mark II (X80) (short-wheelbase models); Toyota Crown (S130) (long-wheelbase models); Toyota Crown (S150) (Crown Sedan)
- Successor: Toyota Corolla (E160) (driver's education applications); Toyota JPN Taxi/Comfort Hybrid (taxicab applications)

The Toyota Comfort (Japanese: トヨタ・コンフォート, Hepburn: Toyota Konfōto) and the long-wheelbase Toyota Crown Comfort are a line of mid-size sedans produced by Toyota between 1995 and 2018. A platform derivative of the Toyota Mark II (X80), the Comfort was aimed at fleet buyers with a primary focus on taxicab operators. A third model was released in 2001 as the 11th generation Crown Sedan (the first Crown Sedan not based on the normal Crown executive car) for the Japanese market only. The Crown Sedan was also aimed at fleet buyers, as a high end taxi or for corporate use.

Its main competitors were the Nissan Crew (discontinued in June 2009) and the Nissan Cedric Y31 (discontinued in 2015). Production of the Comfort ceased in January 2018, after more than 22 years in production, and it was subsequently replaced by the Toyota JPN Taxi which was launched at the 45th Tokyo Motor Show in October 2017.

== Description ==
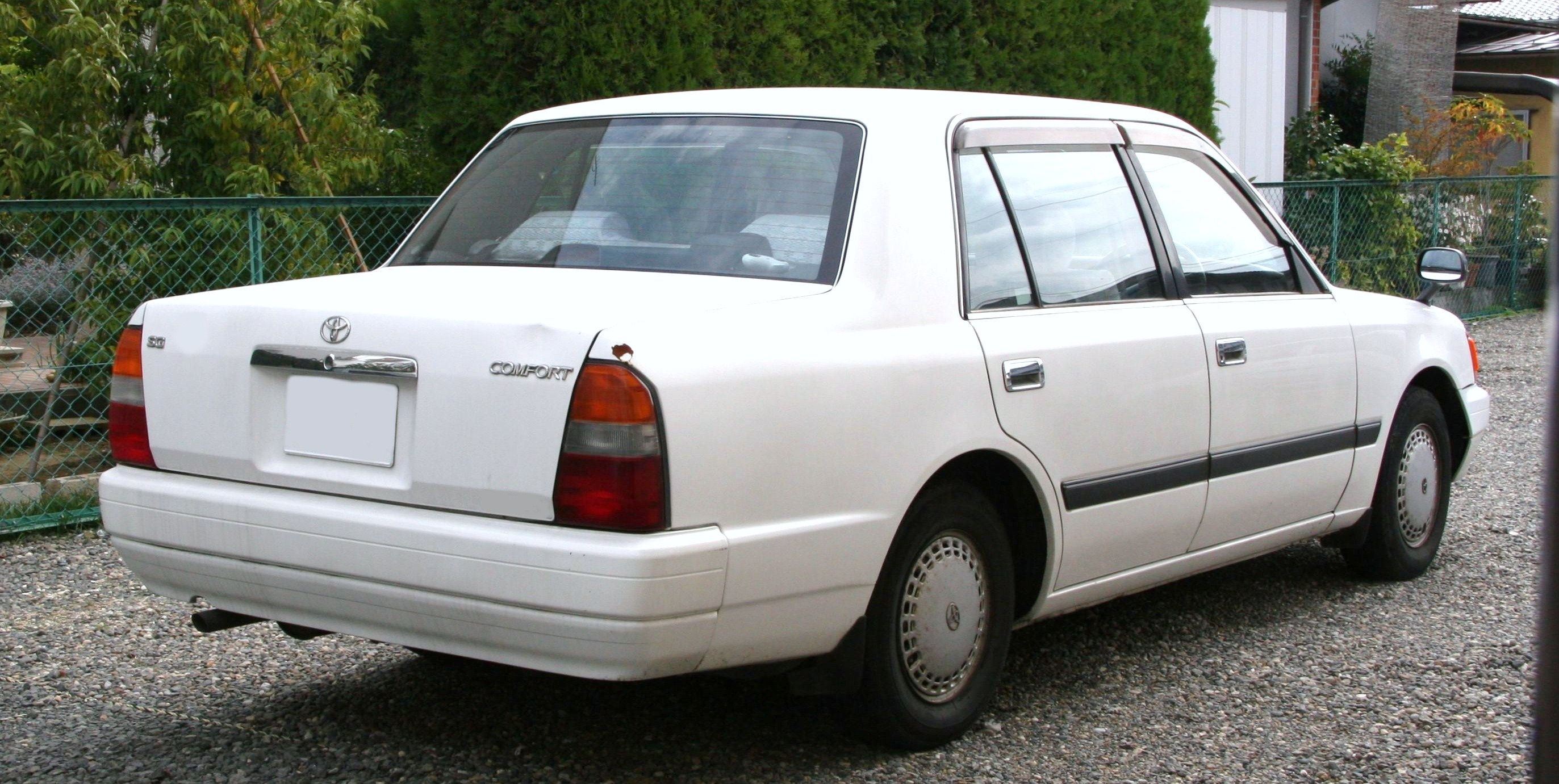
Rear (pre-facelift)

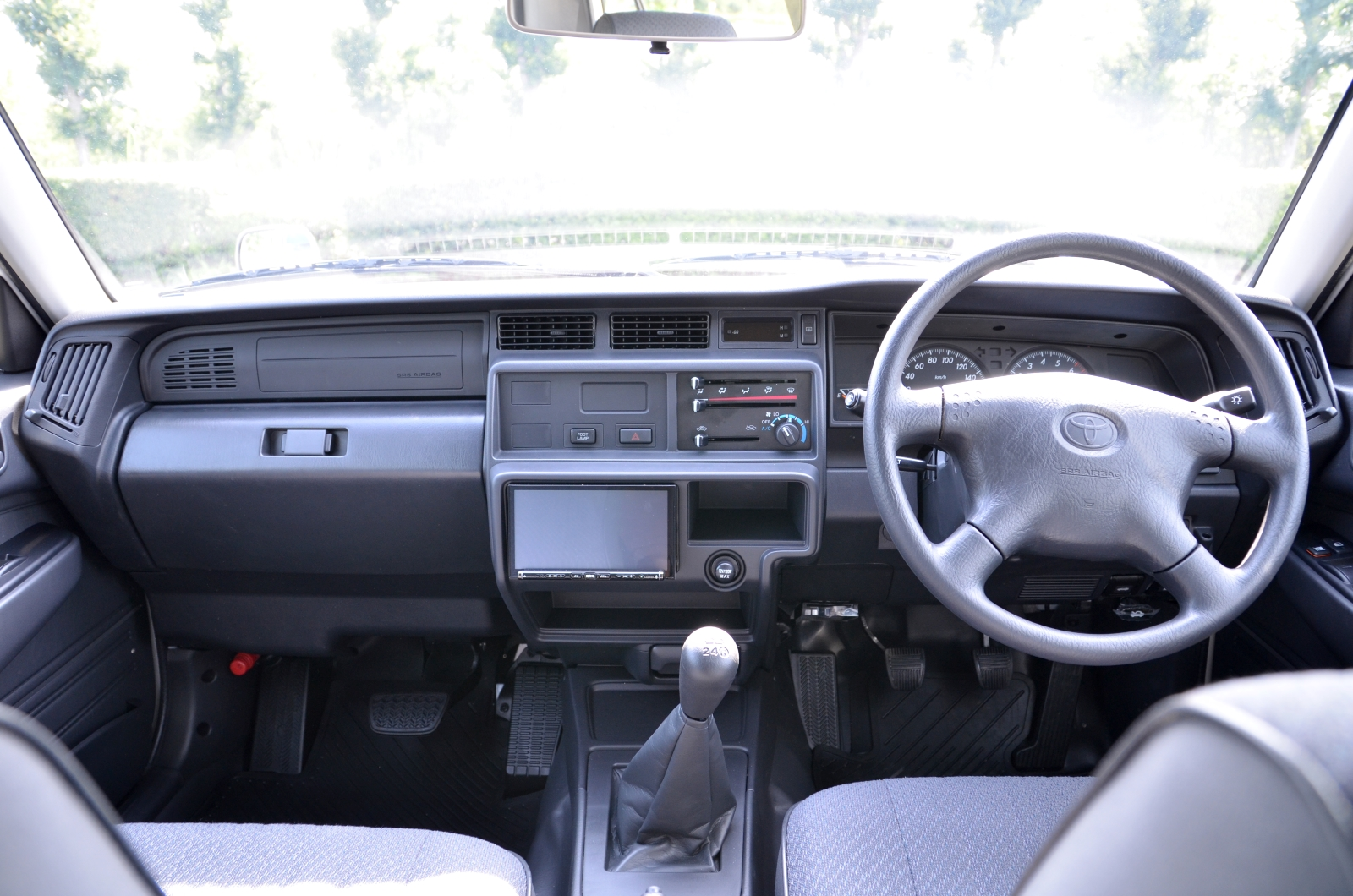
Interior

The Comfort and Crown Comfort were released on 19 December 1995 as replacements for the base fleet versions of the Mark II and the larger Crown. The Comfort was offered only in a five-seat configuration throughout the years, while early Crown Comfort models were offered with a split front bench in place of bucket seats. Five-seater Comforts could only be equipped with a floor-mounted gear lever, while six-seater models were paired with column shifters. A remote control rear passenger door, actuated by the driver through a series of mechanical linkages or a pneumatic system, is standard on taxi models in both Hong Kong and Japan.

=== Markets ===
According to a report in 2011, Toyota has sold 364,000 Comforts since 1995. The model, particularly its long-wheelbase variants, was popular among taxicab operators in Japan, Hong Kong, and Singapore. The short-wheelbase Comfort was commonly used for driver's education in Japan. Crown Comforts were also exported in smaller numbers to Macau and Indonesia, where they were most notably operated by the Blue Bird Group.

In Singapore, the implementation of Euro IV emission requirements forced taxi companies to remove Crown Comforts from service in 2014. Most units were scrapped but a handful were stripped of their drivetrains and donated to the healthcare industry for use in rehabilitation training.

=== Awards ===
In October 2008, the Crown Comfort won the Good Design Award in the long life design award category.

In 2010, the model was named by Akio Toyoda, the president of Toyota, as the winner of the "President's Prize": an internal, semi-official corporate award. The company explained: "The car itself is unspectacular but it is very important to Toyota. This is why Morizo chose the car for the first 'Morizo award,'... the car can be driven over the years by everybody from beginners to experts. And this is the proof that the car is the symbol of Toyota's quality, durability and reliability". "Morizo" is the pseudonym used by Toyoda when participating in motorsport.

== Technical specifications ==
The Comfort uses MacPherson strut independent front suspension and a coil-sprung solid rear axle. The earlier short-wheelbase Comforts were powered by either the 2L-TE diesel engine, 3S-FE/4S-FE gasoline engine, or a 3Y-PE LPG engine. Starting in 2008, they were only offered with the 1998 cc 1TR-FPE and 1TR-FE engine, producing 83 kW (113 PS) at 4,800 rpm, and 100 kW (136 PS) at 5,600 rpm respectively.

The long-wheelbase Crown Comfort had more variety when it came to engine choices. Early export models to Hong Kong, Indonesia and Singapore offered 2L and 5L diesel engines, while domestic Japanese models received the 3Y-PE and 1G-GPE LPG engine only. Hong Kong eventually received the 3Y-PE engine a few years later, but Indonesia and Singapore only received diesel models. The 1G-GPE engine was phased out in 2002, and in 2008, the 3Y-PE model was phased out in favour of the new 1TR-powered vehicles.

Some Super Deluxe and Crown Sedan models received the six-cylinder 1G-GPE initially and later the 1G-FE, the former of which was dropped after 2002, and the latter after 2007; BAS mild hybrid drivetrains with the 1G-FE were also available from 2002 until 2008. After the discontinuation of the mild hybrid, they were only offered with 1TR-FPE engines. Six-cylinder engines were not offered in the short-wheelbase Comfort and lower trim levels of the Crown Comfort.

=== Models ===
YXS10/YXS10H — The YXS10 was the first vehicle to be identified as the Crown Comfort. It came equipped with a lever-activated remote control rear passenger door, and a 4-speed automatic transmission (A43D) became standard in 2004 in some markets. The YXS10H is a four-cylinder Crown Sedan Super Saloon built from 2002 to 2008 equipped with the 3Y-PE LPG engine.

YXS11/YXS11Y ー The YXS11/YXS11Y are 3Y-PE powered LPG models. The 11 series denotes a short-wheelbase version, identified as Toyota Comfort (without the word Crown on the nameplate). At 2680 mm, its wheelbase is identical to that of the X80 Mark II and 100 mm shorter than that of the long-wheelbase 10 series models. Additionally, cars with a Y suffix denotes that the car is a driver's education vehicle.

LXS10 – The LXS10 is an export-only vehicle equipped with the naturally aspirated 2L diesel motor, with a column-mounted 4-speed/floor-mounted 5-speed manual transmission only.

LXS11/LXS11Y ー The LXS11/LXS11Y are powered by the 2L-TE Turbodiesel engine. It was sold from 1996 to 1999, but was ultimately phased out in favour of the petrol-powered S-engined cars. The LXS11 taxi models only came in four-speed automatic, and only 6680 of these models were made.

LXS12 – The LXS12 is an export-only Crown Comfort equipped with a naturally aspirated 5L diesel engine and a column-mounted 4-speed/floor-mounted 5-speed manual transmission. In Singapore, this model was identified simply as Toyota Crown (without the word Comfort on the nameplate).

SXS11Y/SXS13Y ー The SXS11Y is powered by the 4S-FE engine, and was made from 1996 to 2001. The SXS11Y was replaced by the 3S-FE powered SXS13Y in 2001. These models were only offered to driving schools; the TRD Comfort GT-Z Supercharger is also on the SXS13Y chassis.

GXS10/GXS12 ー The GXS10/GXS12 are powered by the 6-cylinder 1G engine. All GXS10 models were equipped with the 1G-GPE LPG engine, while the GXS12s had a 1G-FE petrol engine. GXS10 models were sold under the Crown Comfort nameplate between December 1995 and February 2001, offered exclusively in the Super Deluxe trim level, and the Crown Sedan nameplate between October 2001 and October 2002. Unlike the four-cylinder Crown Sedans, early Super Saloon models with the 1G-GPE engine (produced only in 2002) were simply identified as GXS10s without the H suffix. The GXS12 designation exclusively denotes Crown Sedan Super Deluxe models manufactured between August 2001 and August 2007.

GBS12 ー The GBS12 is a mild hybrid version of the 6-cylinder petrol-powered Crown Sedan Super Deluxe manufactured between October 2002 and April 2008.

TSS10/TSS10H ー The TSS10 is a Crown Comfort or Crown Sedan, built from August 2008 to January 2018, powered by the 1TR-FPE LPG engine. The TSS10H is a Crown Sedan Super Saloon, built during the same period and utilising the same engine.

TSS11/TSS11Y ー The TSS11/TSS11Y are short-wheelbase Comforts powered by the 1TR-FPE LPG engine.

TSS13Y – The TSS13Y is a short-wheelbase driver's education model utilising a petrol powered 1TR-FE.

=== Engines ===
Model	Engine	Cyl.	Fuel	Power	Torque
YXS10 (1995-2008)	1,998 cc (2.0 L) OHV 3Y-PE	I4	LPG	79 PS (58 kW; 78 hp)	16.3 kg⋅m (160 N⋅m; 118 lb⋅ft)
YXS10H (2002-2008)	1,998 cc (2.0 L) OHV 3Y-PE	I4	LPG	79 PS (58 kW; 78 hp)	16.3 kg⋅m (160 N⋅m; 118 lb⋅ft)
YXS11 (1995-2008)	1,998 cc (2.0 L) OHV 3Y-PE	I4	LPG	79 PS (58 kW; 78 hp)	16.3 kg⋅m (160 N⋅m; 118 lb⋅ft)
YXS11Y (1995-2008)	1,998 cc (2.0 L) OHV 3Y-PE	I4	LPG	79 PS (58 kW; 78 hp)	16.3 kg⋅m (160 N⋅m; 118 lb⋅ft)
LXS10 (1995-1999)	2,446 cc (2.4 L) SOHC 2L-II	I4	Diesel	85 PS (63 kW; 84 hp)	16.8 kg⋅m (165 N⋅m; 122 lb⋅ft)
LXS11 (1995-1999)	2,446 cc (2.4 L) SOHC turbo 2L-TE(II)	I4	Diesel	97 PS (71 kW; 96 hp)	22.5 kg⋅m (221 N⋅m; 163 lb⋅ft)
LXS11Y (1996-1999)	2,446 cc (2.4 L) SOHC turbo 2L-TE(II)	I4	Diesel	97 PS (71 kW; 96 hp)	22.5 kg⋅m (221 N⋅m; 163 lb⋅ft)
LXS12 (1998-2006)	2,985 cc (3.0 L) SOHC 5L	I4	Diesel	91 PS (67 kW; 90 hp)	19.5 kg⋅m (191 N⋅m; 141 lb⋅ft)
SXS11Y (1996-2001)	1,838 cc (1.8 L) DOHC 4S-FE	I4	Petrol	125 PS (92 kW; 123 hp)	16.5 kg⋅m (162 N⋅m; 119 lb⋅ft)
SXS13Y (2001-2007)	1,998 cc (2.0 L) DOHC 3S-FE	I4	Petrol	128 PS (94 kW; 126 hp)	18.3 kg⋅m (179 N⋅m; 132 lb⋅ft)
GXS10 (1995-2002)	1,998 cc (2.0 L) DOHC 1G-GPE	I6	LPG	110 PS (81 kW; 108 hp)	15.5 kg⋅m (152 N⋅m; 112 lb⋅ft)
GXS12 (2001-2007)	1,998 cc (2.0 L) DOHC VVT-i 1G-FE	I6	Petrol	160 PS (118 kW; 158 hp)	20.4 kg⋅m (200 N⋅m; 148 lb⋅ft)
GBS12 (2002-2008)	1,998 cc (2.0 L) DOHC mild hybrid 1G-FE	I6	Petrol	143 PS (105 kW; 141 hp)	20.0 kg⋅m (196 N⋅m; 145 lb⋅ft)
TSS10 (2008-2018)	1,998 cc (2.0 L) DOHC VVT-i 1TR-FPE	I4	LPG	113 PS (83 kW; 111 hp)	19.0 kg⋅m (186 N⋅m; 137 lb⋅ft)
TSS10H (2008-2018)	1,998 cc (2.0 L) DOHC VVT-i 1TR-FPE	I4	LPG	113 PS (83 kW; 111 hp)	19.0 kg⋅m (186 N⋅m; 137 lb⋅ft)
TSS11 (2008-2018)	1,998 cc (2.0 L) DOHC VVT-i 1TR-FPE	I4	LPG	113 PS (83 kW; 111 hp)	19.0 kg⋅m (186 N⋅m; 137 lb⋅ft)
TSS11Y (2008-2018)	1,998 cc (2.0 L) DOHC VVT-i 1TR-FPE	I4	LPG	113 PS (83 kW; 111 hp)	19.0 kg⋅m (186 N⋅m; 137 lb⋅ft)
TSS13Y (2007-2015)	1,998 cc (2.0 L) DOHC VVT-i 1TR-FE	I4	Petrol	136 PS (100 kW; 134 hp)	18.6 kg⋅m (182 N⋅m; 135 lb⋅ft)
TSS13Y (2015-2018)	1,998 cc (2.0 L) DOHC Dual VVT-i 1TR-FE	I4	Petrol	139 PS (102 kW; 137 hp)	18.7 kg⋅m (183 N⋅m; 135 lb⋅ft)

=== Equipment ===
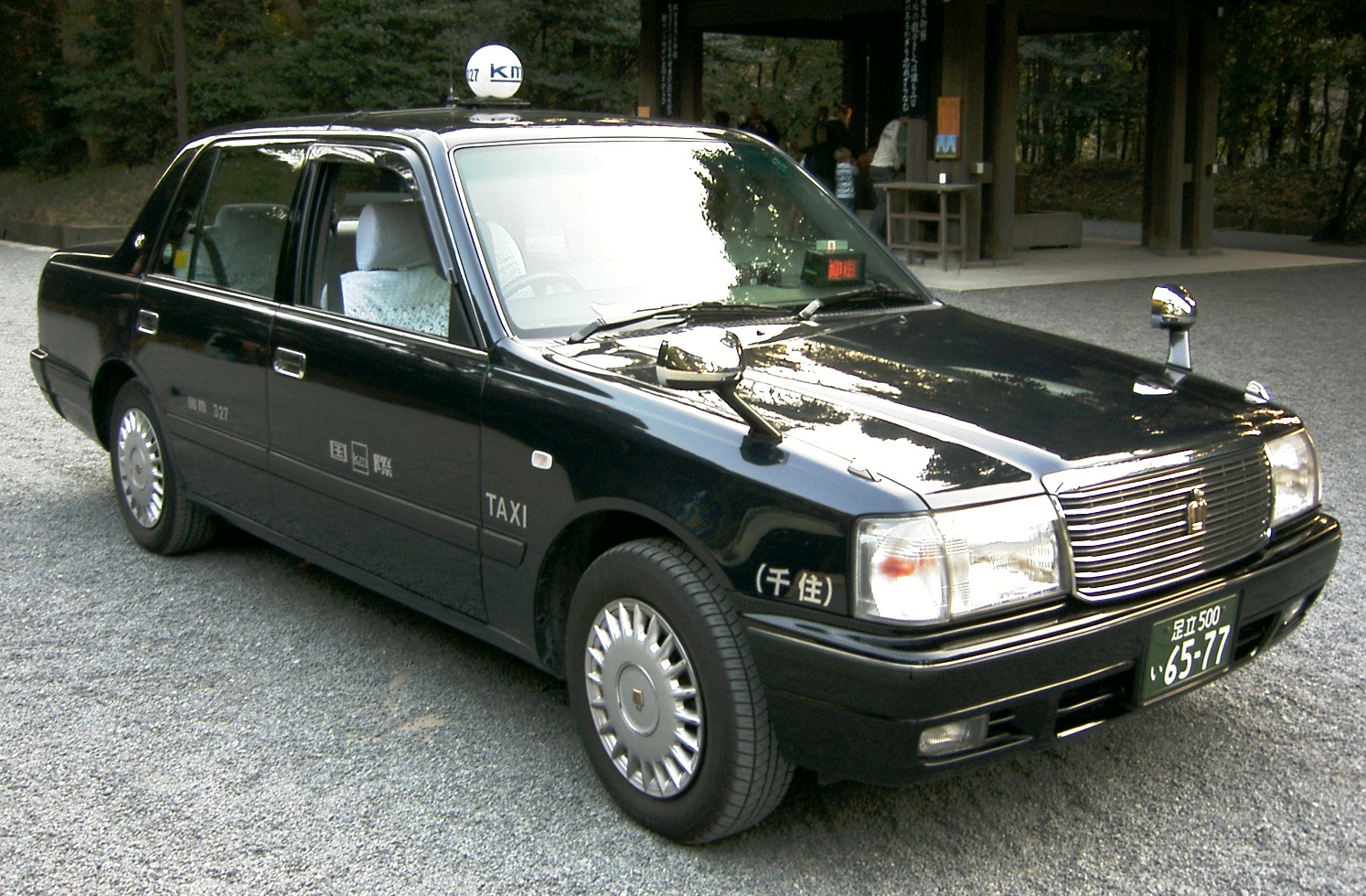

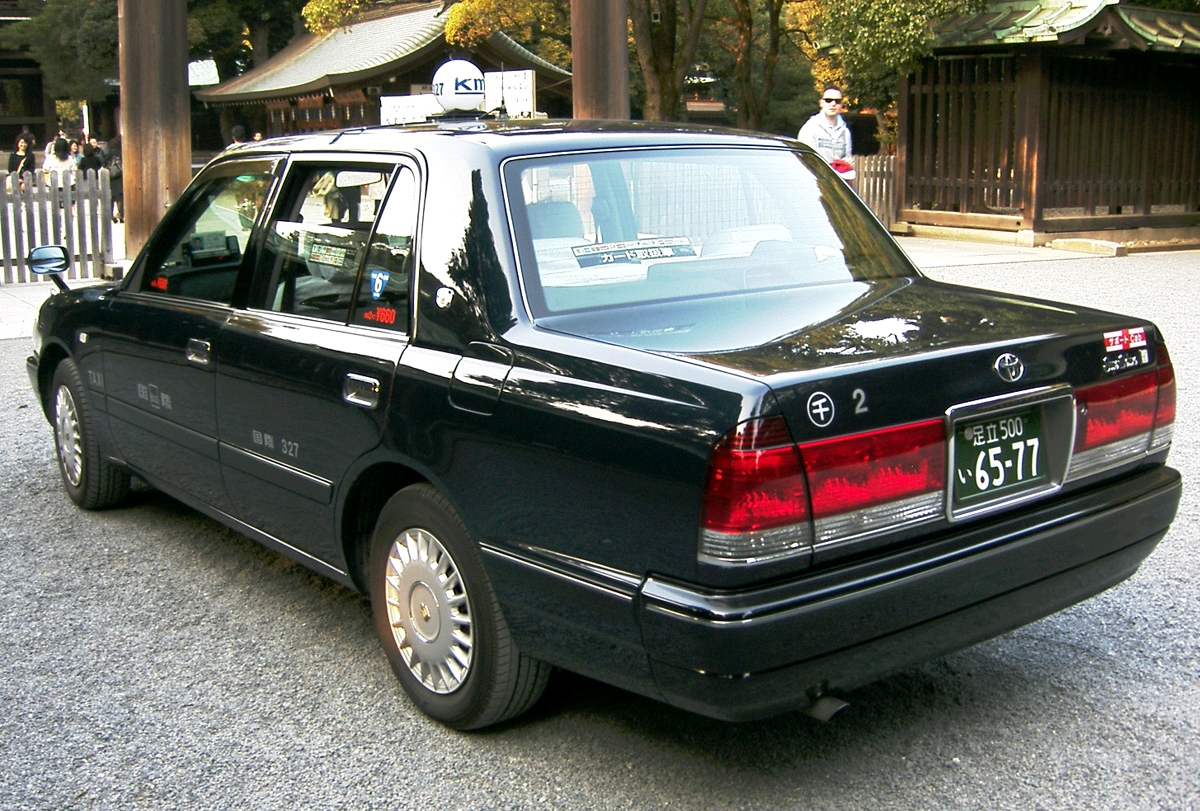
Toyota Crown Sedan (facelift)

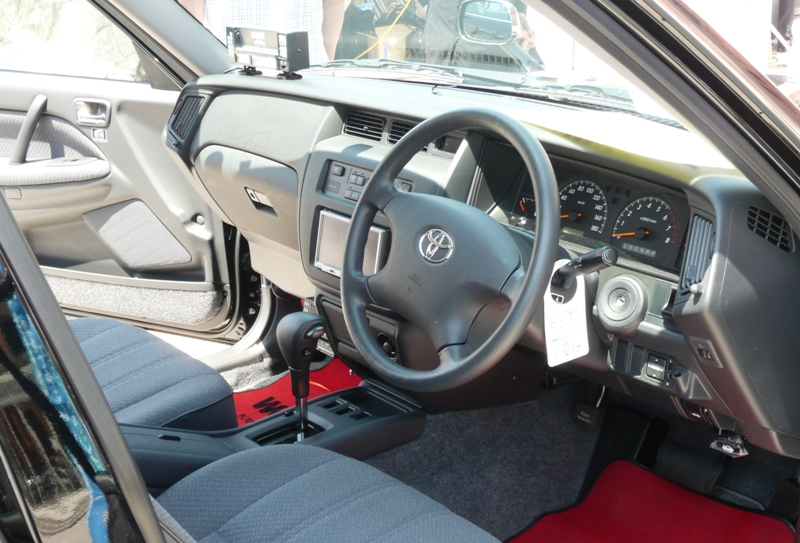
Interior

While the Comfort shares its underpinnings with the X80 Mark II, its body was thoroughly redesigned to increase interior space with an emphasis on rear passenger comfort. To reduce unnecessary cost and weight while provisioning for the installation of taxi equipment, the more luxurious dashboard and interior fittings of the Mark II were replaced with a modified version of the base S130 Crown's dashboard and less bulky all-plastic fittings with very simple designs.

Comfort-based Crown Sedans received a facelift comprising chrome-accented bumpers and body-coloured side mouldings, redesigned taillights, and a new boot panel with additional light clusters and a chrome-rimmed number plate garnish. Crown Sedans also received an updated interior with a more elegant instrument panel, various elements derived from those found in the preceding tenth generation Crown Sedan, and a steering wheel shared with consumer-oriented models like the XV30 Camry.

Taxi models came equipped with fender mirrors, while the private use and driver's education cars were equipped with door-mounted mirrors. Early Comforts below the SG trim level had manual windows on all four doors; power front windows were optional, and standardised in the beginning of 1997. In 2007, Toyota added power windows at all four doors as an option. The front bumper is designed to be able to split in two, and driving lamps can be quickly removed for ease of repair in case of an accident.

Welcab (paratransit) versions of the taxi models were offered, adding a rear passenger seat that rotates outwards to aid the entry and exit of passengers with limited mobility; these cars can be identified by the International Symbol of Access on the corresponding door. A "swing roof" option was also offered for Crown Comforts and Crown Sedans used in Shinto weddings, adding a hinged roof panel above the rear passenger door that opens upwards to allow for the clearance of a bride's wig and headdress during entry and exit.

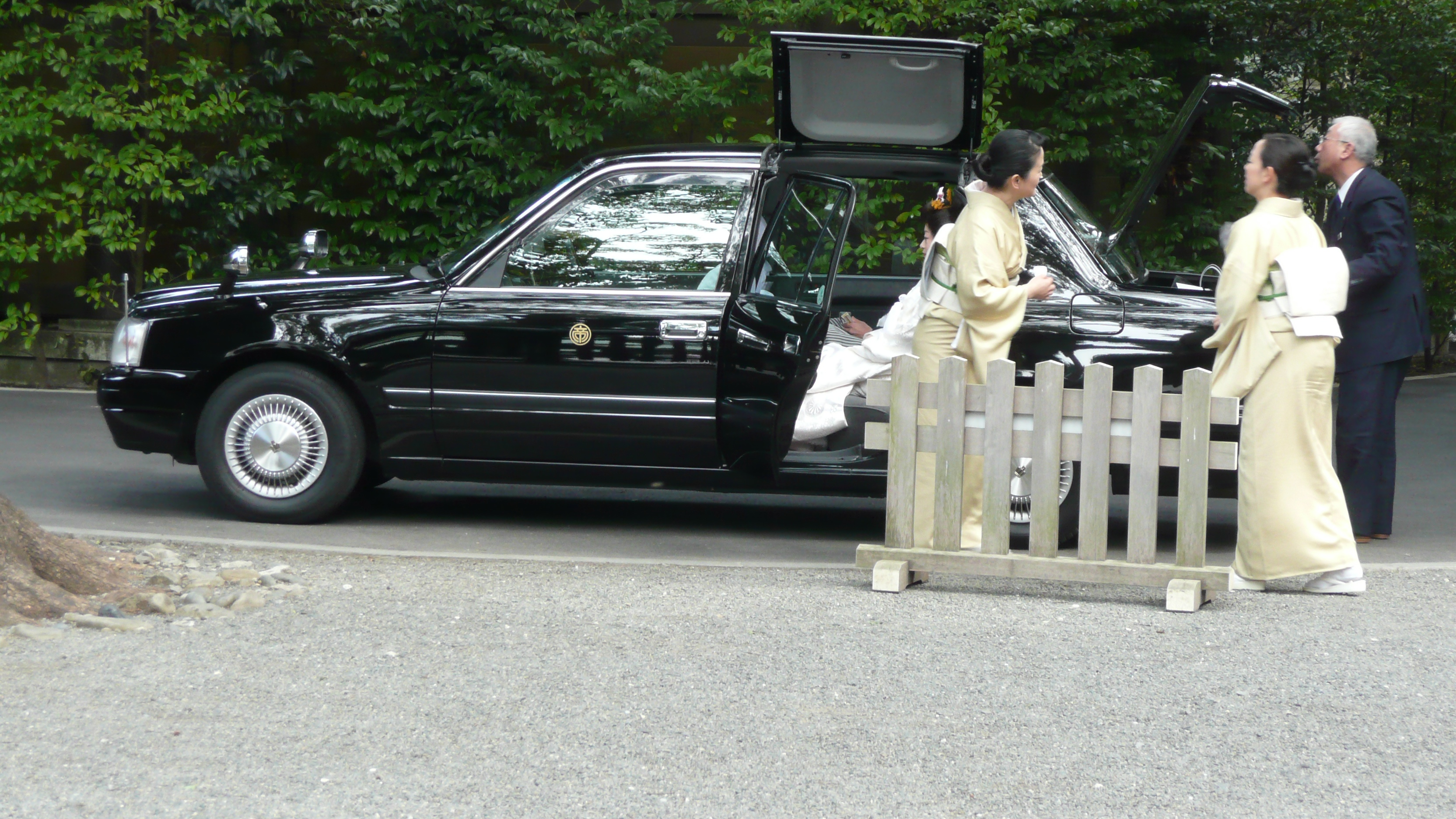
A "swing roof"-equipped Crown Comfort with the roof panel opened

In 2002, all models received ABS and a driver's airbag as standard. In 2004, an LED third brake light replaced the original incandescent unit while side turn signals (shared with the XP30 bB) were added to the front fenders. In August 2007, the Crown Comfort was facelifted for the Hong Kong market by adopting the Japanese market Crown Sedan's chrome-accented bumpers, taillights, and redesigned boot panel.

In late 2007, a minor update was made to the Comfort's emissions system to meet more stringent emission standards set by Toyota, while the use of LED lights for instrument panel illumination was increased. Larger headrests were gradually phased in beginning with SG and Crown Sedan models circa 2001, and ending with Standard and Deluxe taxi models in 2012. All Comforts eventually gained a passenger airbag and start-stop system as standard equipment; the latter being offered exclusively in the Japanese market.

Comforts configured for driver's education use were only offered in the Deluxe trim level and are equipped with a secondary brake pedal on the passenger footwell for instructor use. A radio delete option was offered for the driver's education model. Most (if not all) models from 1995 to 1997 were equipped with a digital auxiliary speedometer on the centre console as standard. In 1996, an optional brake light indicator was added to the centre console. Cars built in 1997 had this light moved to the passenger side of the dash, with clutch and accelerator indicator lights added to the mix. All cars made after 1998 had the indicator lights moved to a redesigned centre console stack.

=== Trim levels ===
- Standard ー included steel wheels (initially 14-inch, later 15-inch), three-point seat belts, air conditioning, a radio with two dash-mounted speakers, vinyl interior upholstery and power steering.
- Deluxe ー added cloth interior upholstery (seating surfaces only before 2004); power locks, mirrors and windows were optional.
- SG ー added standard power features, faux wood interior trim, premium cloth interior upholstery and wheel covers; 15-inch alloy wheels from the V30 Camry were optional. This was the highest trim level available for the short-wheelbase Comfort and was not offered for long-wheelbase models.
- Super Deluxe ー Super Deluxe models were marketed under the Crown Comfort nameplate before August 2001 and the Crown Sedan nameplate from August 2001 onwards. While the original Super Deluxe models were equipped similarly to the short-wheelbase SG, available with an optional "Q Package" which added luxury cloth upholstery and faux wood interior trim, the change of nameplate in 2001 added more upscale exterior styling with wider taillights, chrome-accented painted exterior trim, deluxe wheel covers and chrome-finished versions of the optional alloy wheels; interior equipment included luxury seats with a rear fold-down armrest, a premium dashboard and interior fittings, four cupholders, and an upgraded audio system with four door-mounted speakers. The front passenger seat could now be configured with a fold-down centre section so that a rear passenger may stretch his feet forward. The "Q Package" was renamed "G Package" and gained an air purifier as part of its equipment.
- Super Saloon — introduced in 2002, this trim level was only marketed under the Crown Sedan nameplate. It added the "G Package" and chrome-finished alloy wheels as standard equipment, as well as longer bumpers. It was only available with LPG engines and was aimed primarily at corporate, government and sedan service buyers; door mirrors were standard, while fender mirrors were available for cars used in taxi service. Due to the extended bumpers, Super Saloons exceeded the 4.7 m (15.4 ft) length threshold of Japan's "small-size passenger vehicle" classification and were instead classified as "normal-size passenger vehicles" as a result.

=== TRD Comfort GT-Z Supercharger ===
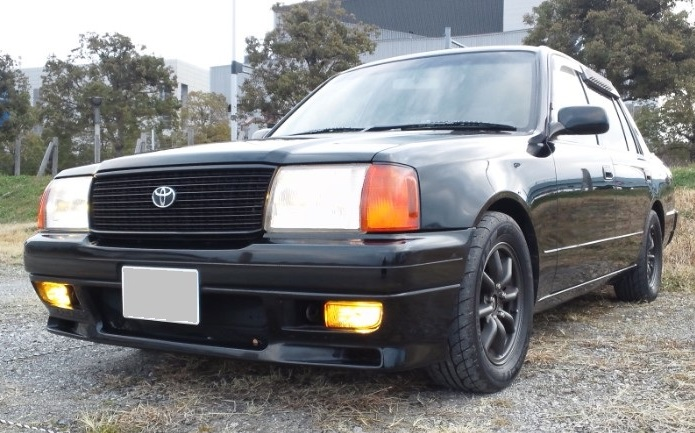
TRD Comfort GT-Z Supercharger

The TRD Comfort GT-Z Supercharger was a limited production high-performance version of the SXS13Y model produced from July 2003 until February 2004. A total of 59 GT-Z units were produced. It is equipped with the same 3S-FE DOHC 2.0 L inline-four petrol engine as the base car but fitted with an ORC-TX07 supercharger, increasing power output to 160 PS (118 kW; 158 hp) at 6100 rpm and torque to 22.5 kg⋅m (221 N⋅m; 163 lb⋅ft) at 3300 rpm.

== Nameplate usage for other models ==
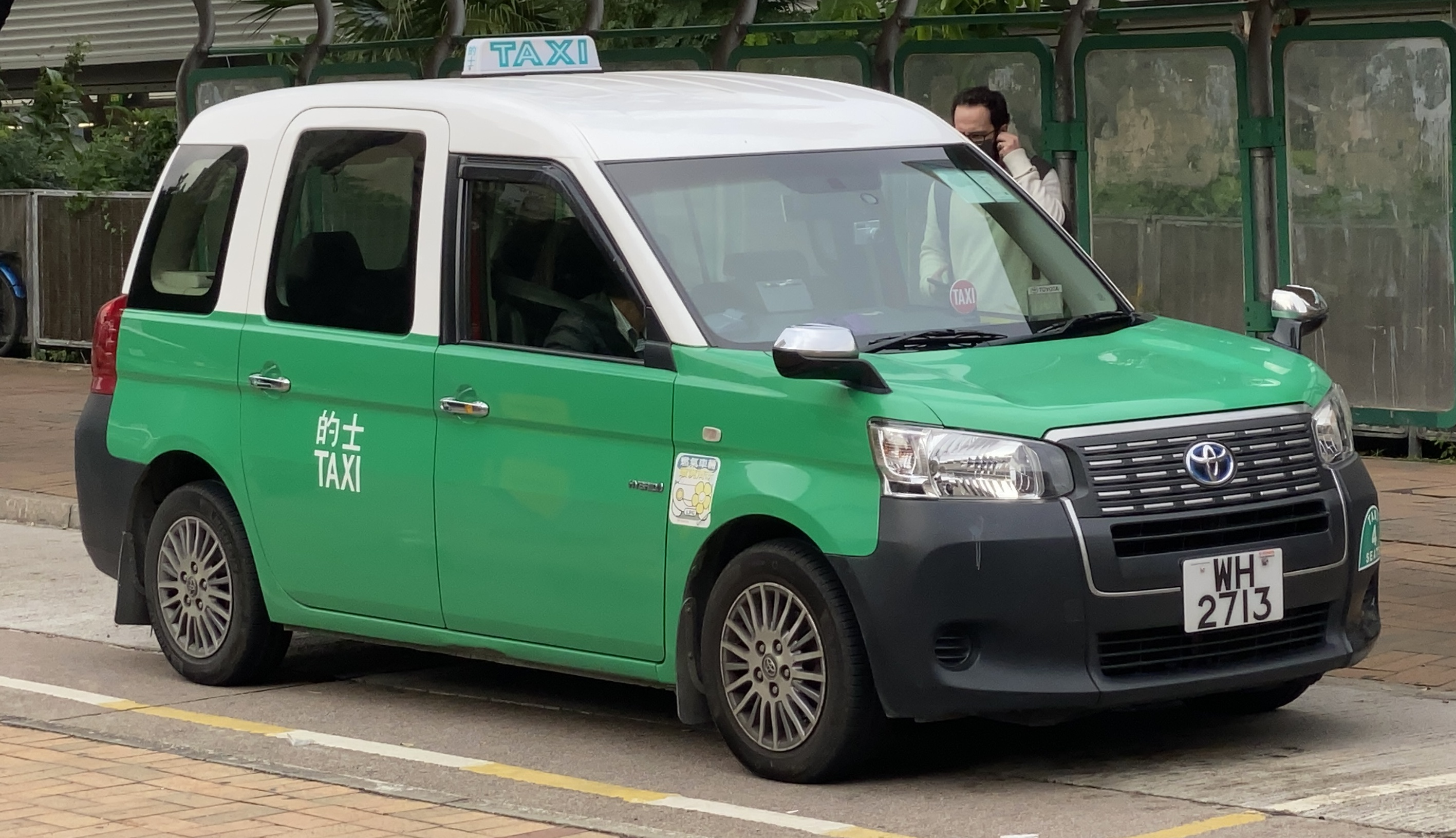
Hong Kong Toyota Comfort Hybrid taxicab

=== Comfort Hybrid (NTP10R) ===
In July 2018, a rebadged version of the Toyota JPN Taxi debuted in Hong Kong under the Comfort Hybrid (Chinese: 豐田金豐混能的士) nameplate, with sales commencing in January 2019. The powertrain is an "LPG hybrid system" based on the existing THS II, made compatible with LPG fuel through the use of the 1.5L 1NZ-FXP LPG engine. As of January 2026, around 4,000 examples of the Comfort Hybrid are in service across Hong Kong.

== Gallery ==
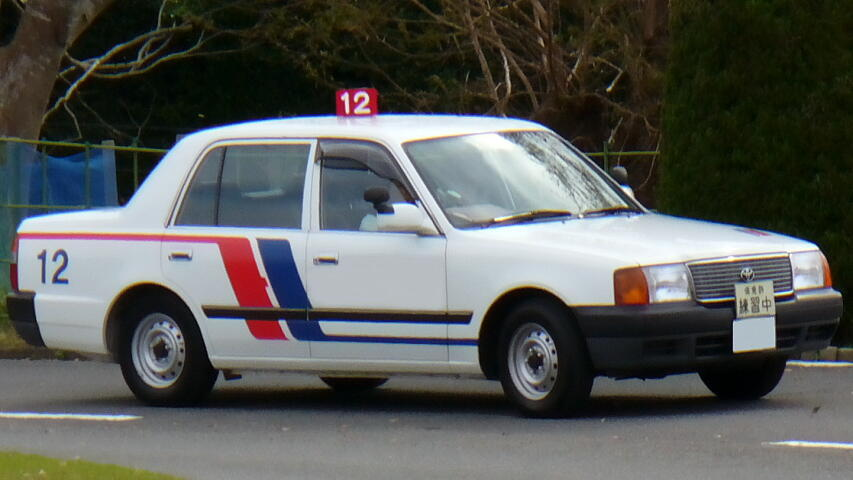
Toyota Comfort driver's education car in Japan.

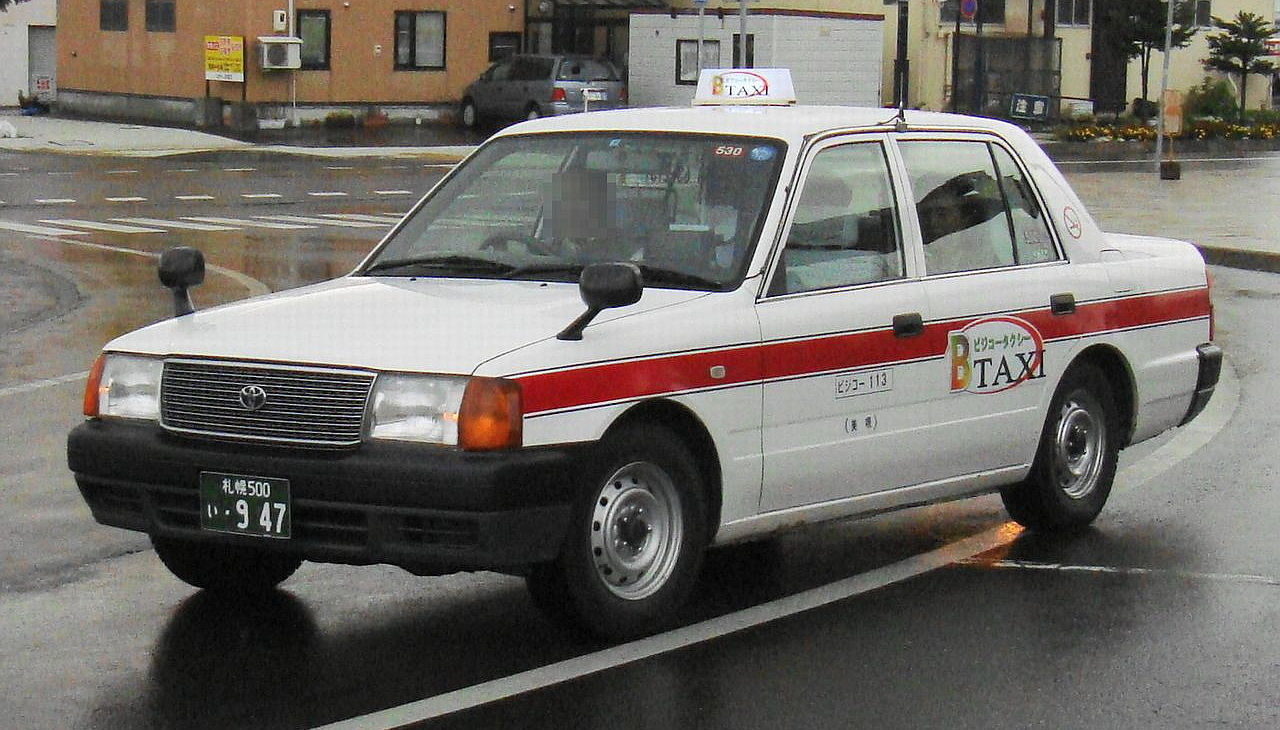
Toyota Crown Comfort taxicab in Japan.

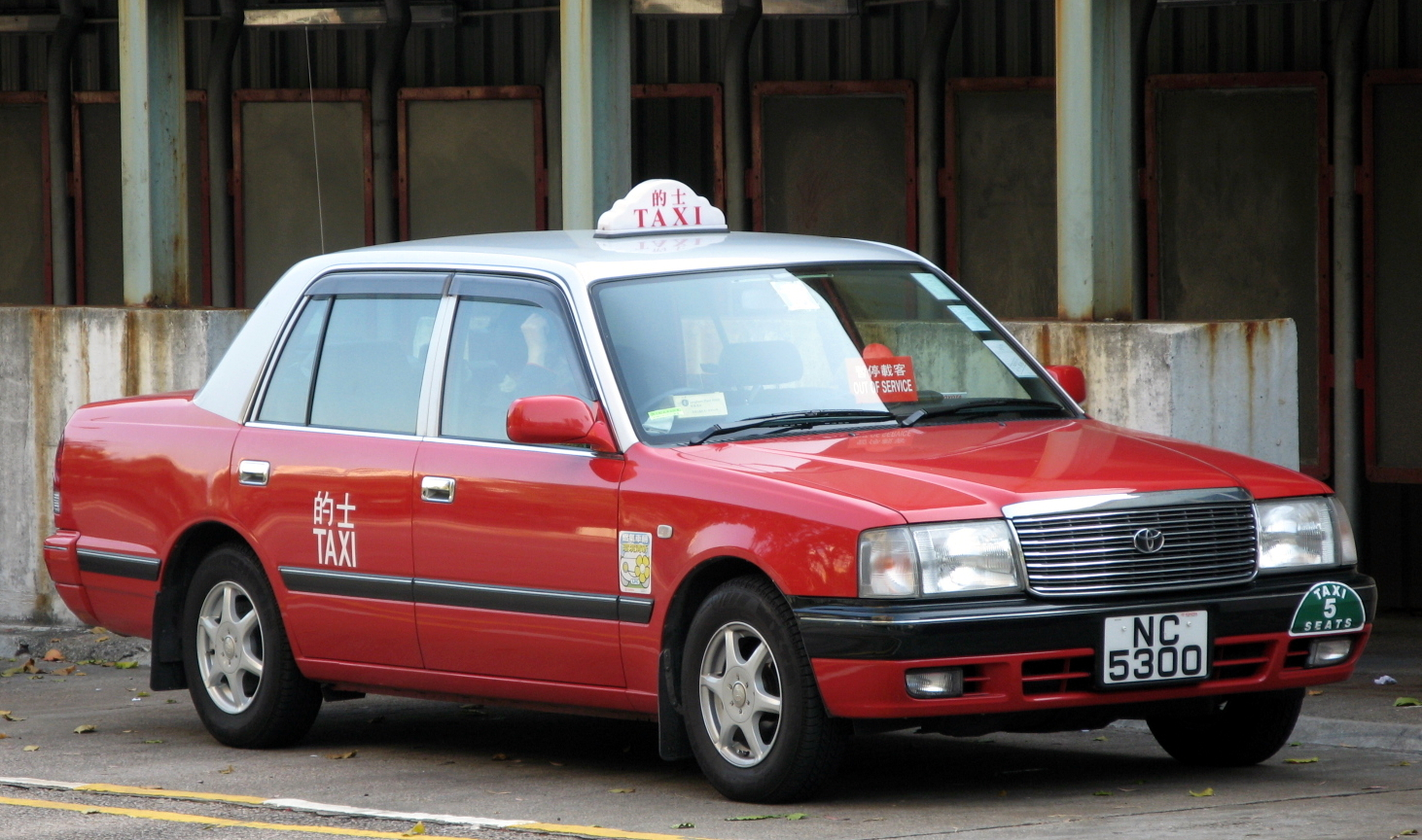
Toyota Crown Comfort taxicab in Hong Kong

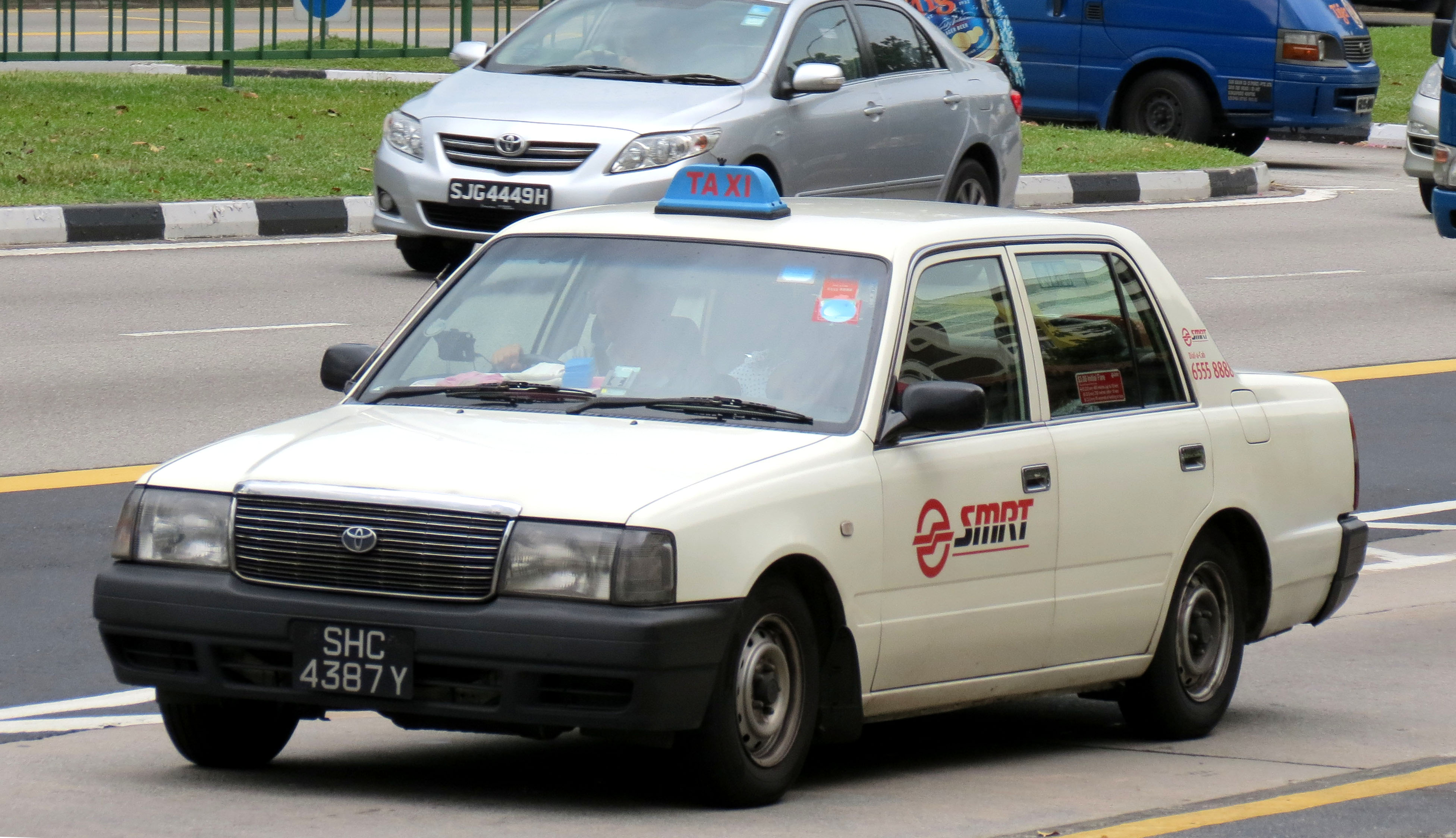
Toyota Crown Comfort taxicab in Singapore

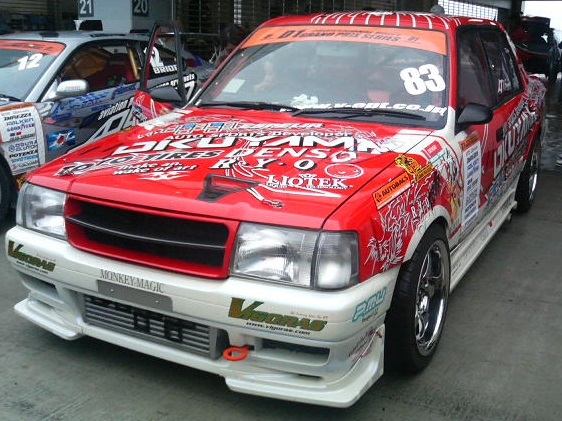
Toyota Crown Comfort modified to be a drift car

== See also ==
- List of Toyota vehicles
