= The Limo =

The Limo may refer to:

- "The Limo" (Seinfeld)
- "The Limo" (How I Met Your Mother)
- "The Limo" (Yes, Dear episode)

== See also ==
- Limo (disambiguation)
