= Sedan service =

Type of transportation service

A sedan service is a transportation service that offers taxi-like rides in vehicles. Sedan services exist in many places, though the exact definition, along with regulations, may vary in different places. In some places, the term refers to a more luxurious service than taxicabs, while in other areas, it is a cheaper alternative. In most places, the ride must be prearranged, and a sedan driver is not legally permitted to pick up a hailing passenger like a taxicab. Also, most sedan services do not use meters like taxicabs, but rather charge by the mile, following the odometer.

Where sedan services are cheaper, many such providers use older vehicles, and do not have the same level of protection as taxicabs, which has raised concerns in some places for both the drivers and passengers.

Some cities that have shortages of taxicabs encourage the use of sedan services to supplement the number of cabs on the streets.

== Definition by location ==
=== United States ===
==== Maryland ====
In Maryland, the legal definition of a sedan service is the operation of a motor vehicle for hire using a motor vehicle designed to carry 15 or fewer persons, including the driver.

==== California ====
In California, sedan services are regulated by the California Public Utilities Commission (CPUC). These services are defined as "charter-party carriers" and must operate under a permit or certificate issued by the CPUC. Sedan services in California must be prearranged, and the fares are typically based on vehicle mileage or hourly rates, not on metered distances like traditional taxicabs.

==== New York City ====
In New York City, sedan services are known as For-Hire Vehicles (FHVs), which include black cars, luxury limousines, and community cars. The Taxi and Limousine Commission (TLC) oversees these services, requiring them to be licensed. Fares for sedan services in NYC must be prearranged and are often calculated based on time and distance, rather than using a taxi meter.

=== Canada ===
Toronto: In Toronto, Bylaw (Toronto Municipal Code 546) provides for sedan services as a vehicle-for-hire license for limousine, taxicab, and private transportation companies such as Lyft, Uber, and private limo service companies. These services are designed to carry four or more passengers, including the driver.

=== United Kingdom ===
In the UK, sedan services are commonly referred to as private hire vehicles (PHVs) or minicabs. These vehicles must be pre-booked through a licensed private hire operator and cannot be hailed on the street. The regulation of PHVs is managed by local councils, and in London, Transport for London (TfL) oversees the licensing and operation of these services. Fares for PHVs are determined by the operator and are typically based on distance and time.

=== Australia ===
In Australia, sedan services are regulated by state and territory governments. In New South Wales (NSW), for example, sedan services fall under the category of "booked hire services" and must be prearranged through an accredited booking service provider. The Point to Point Transport Commission regulates these services, ensuring that vehicles meet safety standards and drivers are properly accredited. Similar regulations apply in other states, with variations in specific licensing and fare calculation methods.

=== Singapore ===
In Singapore, sedan services are part of the private hire car sector, which includes services like Grab and Gojek. The Land Transport Authority (LTA) regulates these services, requiring drivers to obtain a Private Hire Car Driver's Vocational Licence (PDVL). Fares for private hire cars in Singapore are typically dynamic, based on demand, distance, and time, and must be prearranged through the respective platform's app.
