= Toyota JPN Taxi =

Hybrid electric taxicab

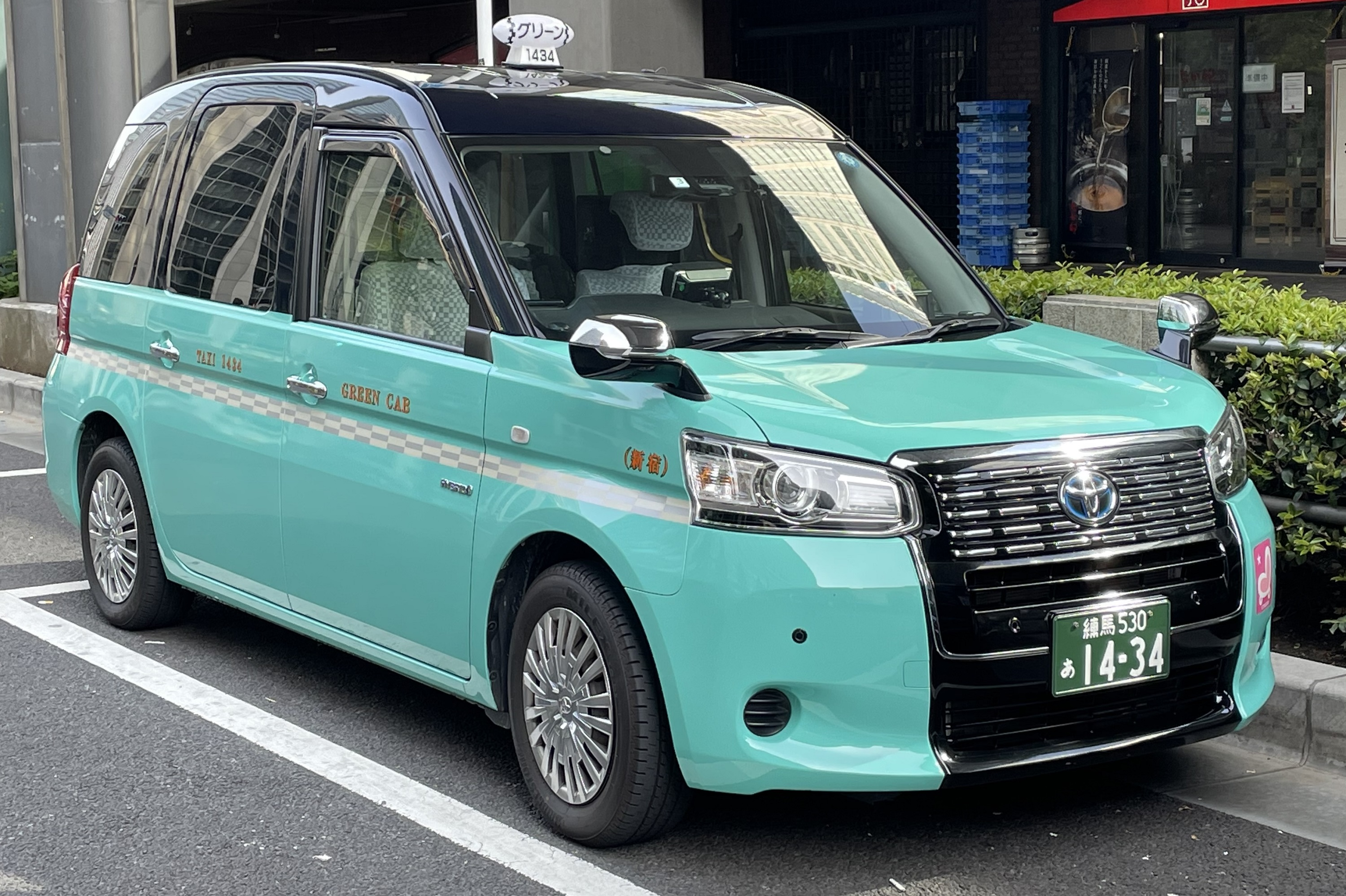
- A Toyota JPN Taxi Green Cab

Overview
- Manufacturer: Toyota
- Model code: NTP10
- Also called: Toyota Comfort Hybrid (Hong Kong); Toyota Thai Taxi (Thailand)
- Production: October 2017 – present
- Assembly: Japan: Susono, Shizuoka (Toyota Motor East Japan); Ōhira, Miyagi (Toyota Motor East Japan)
- Designer: Hiroshi Kayukawa

Body and chassis
- Class: Taxi
- Body style: 5-door MPV
- Layout: Front-engine, front-wheel-drive
- Platform: Toyota B platform
- Doors: 3 conventional doors; 1 slide door (rear left)
- Related: Toyota Sienta Hybrid (XP170)

Powertrain
- Engine: 1.5 L 1NZ-FXP I4
- Electric motor: 45 kW (61 PS) 2LM AC synchronous
- Transmission: 1-speed planetary gear
- Hybrid drivetrain: Full hybrid (THS II)
- Battery: Nickel–metal hydride

Dimensions
- Wheelbase: 2,750 mm (108.3 in)
- Length: 4,400 mm (173.2 in)
- Width: 1,695 mm (66.7 in)
- Height: 1,750 mm (68.9 in)

Chronology
- Predecessor: Toyota Comfort/Toyota Crown Sedan

The Toyota JPN Taxi (Japanese: トヨタ・ジャパンタクシー, Hepburn: Toyota Japantakushī) is a hybrid electric taxicab built to universal design specifications mandated by the Japanese government. Exhibited as the JPN Taxi Concept at the 43rd Tokyo Motor Show in 2013, it has been produced by Toyota since 2017, mainly for the Japanese, Thai, and Hong Kong markets.

Marketed as a successor to the Comfort and the Crown Sedan, it is currently being manufactured by Toyota Motor East Japan under the supervision of chief engineer Hiroshi Kayukawa.

== Design ==
The JPN Taxi was based around an emissions and accessibility mandate by the Japanese government through consultation from carmakers, taxi companies and disability rights advocates in 2012 to meet its "universal design" goals for the 2020 Summer Olympics. Built in part to evoke the same sense of recognition as the iconic London black cab, it is available from Toyota in 3 colours: black, white, and a deep indigo Toyota refers to as koiai (深藍).

The vehicle's exterior dimensions are in compliance with Japanese vehicle size regulations that allow tax savings for commercial use. While the JPN Taxi was developed in conjunction with the Toyota Sienta, the two vehicles share almost no elements besides the floor pan to allow for the fitment of specialized taxi equipment.

The rear seats fold up and a ramp folds out to accommodate wheelchair-using passengers. Access is further aided by the electrically-operated sliding rear passenger door. The driver's side passenger door remains hinged, however, so oncoming traffic can be more easily identified when it is opened and a passenger may step out.

The rear cargo area is spacious enough to hold two large suitcases or four golf bags, while the passenger compartment offers nine inches of headroom due to its high roof. The vehicle comes equipped with built-in soundproofing and air purification, while the high-end "Takumi" trim level includes a ceiling-mounted air circulator and a heating system for the rear seats.

Traditional London black cab maker Geely has attempted to break into the Japanese market with its larger and more expensive LEVC TX, but it exceeds the Japanese size classifications to gain the tax advantages the JPN Taxi benefits from. Additionally, while the JPN Taxi doesn't meet the passenger capacity or turning radius required by London, it provides favourable emissions performance and accessibility.

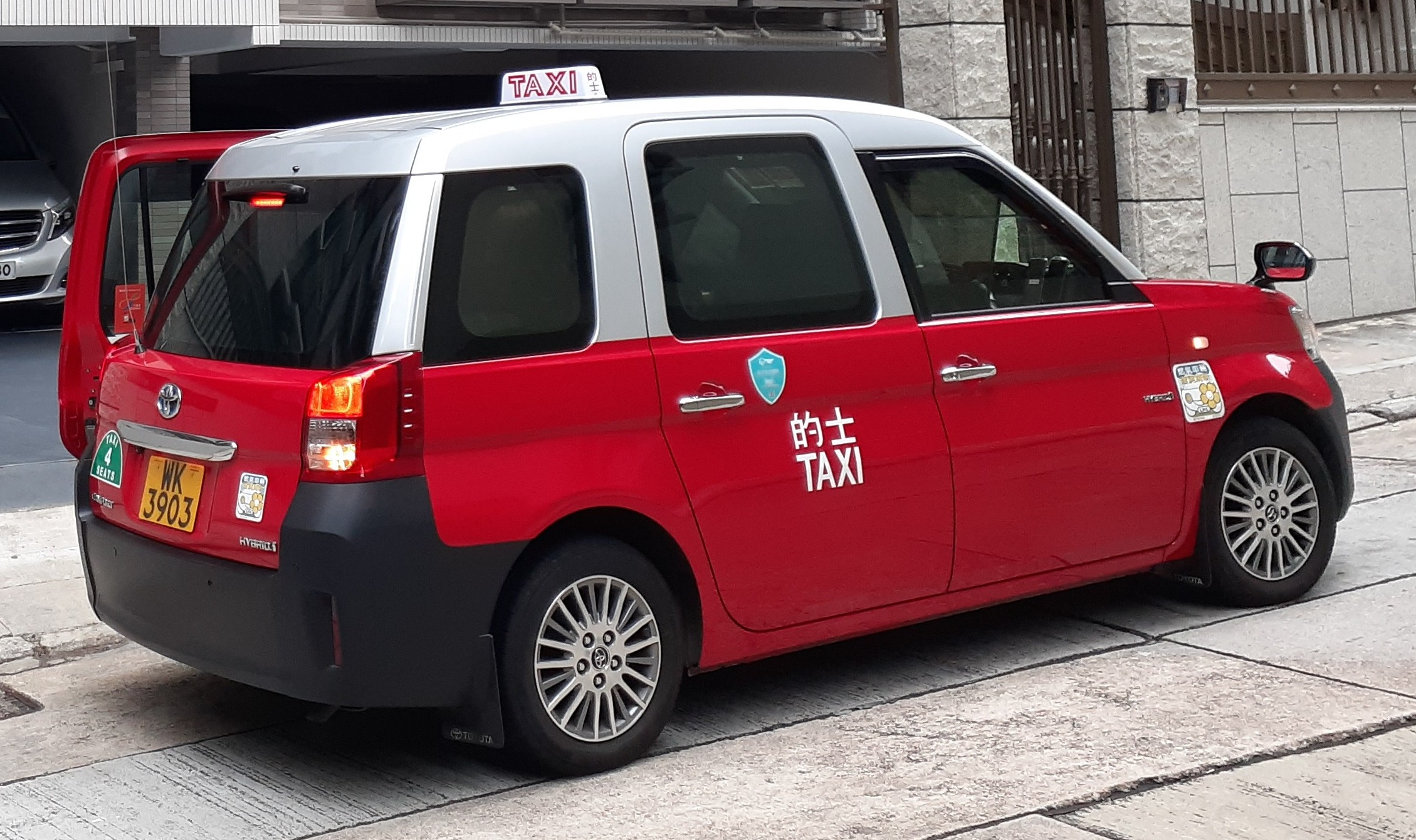
Rear view

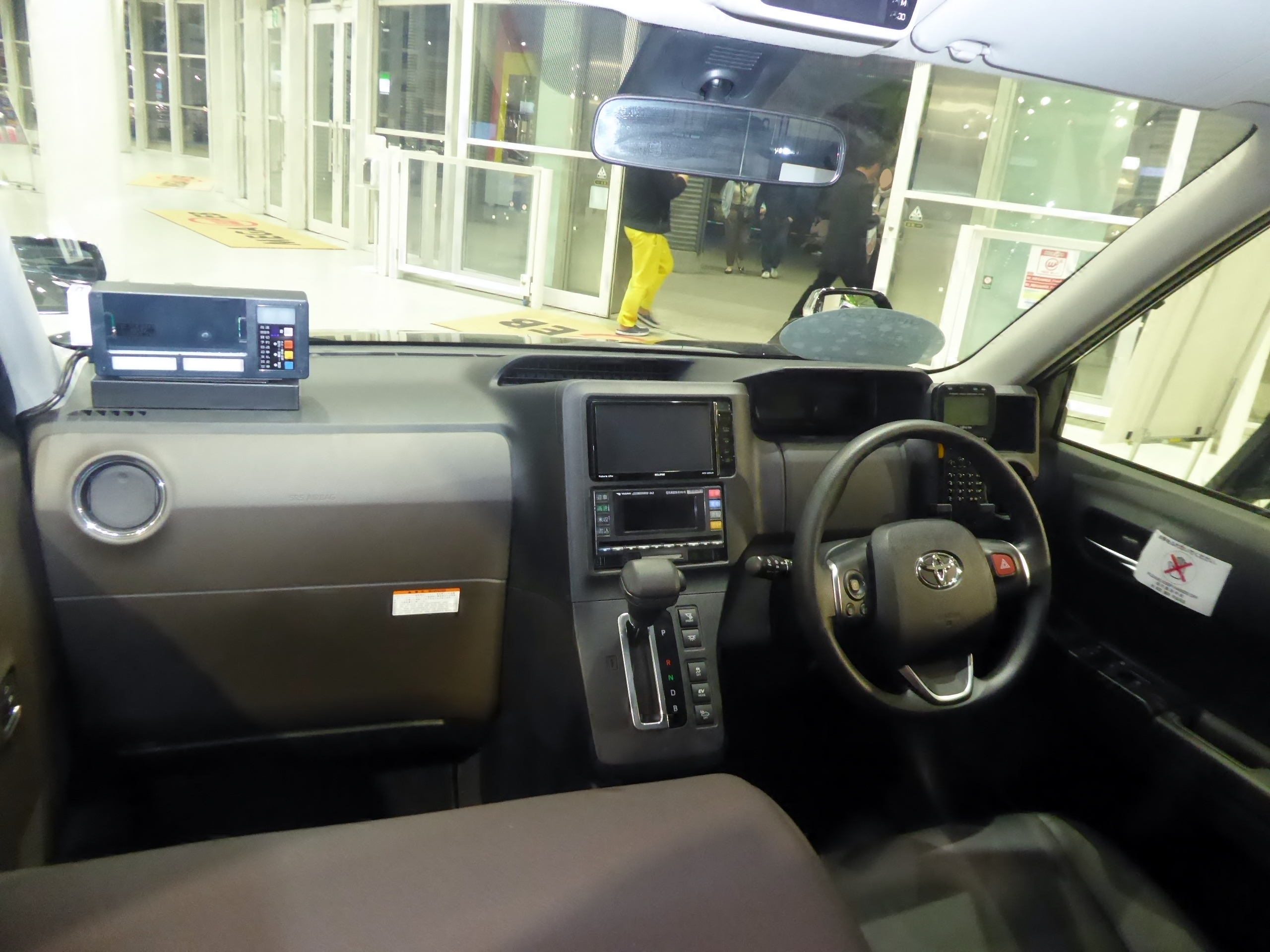
Interior

=== Powertrain ===
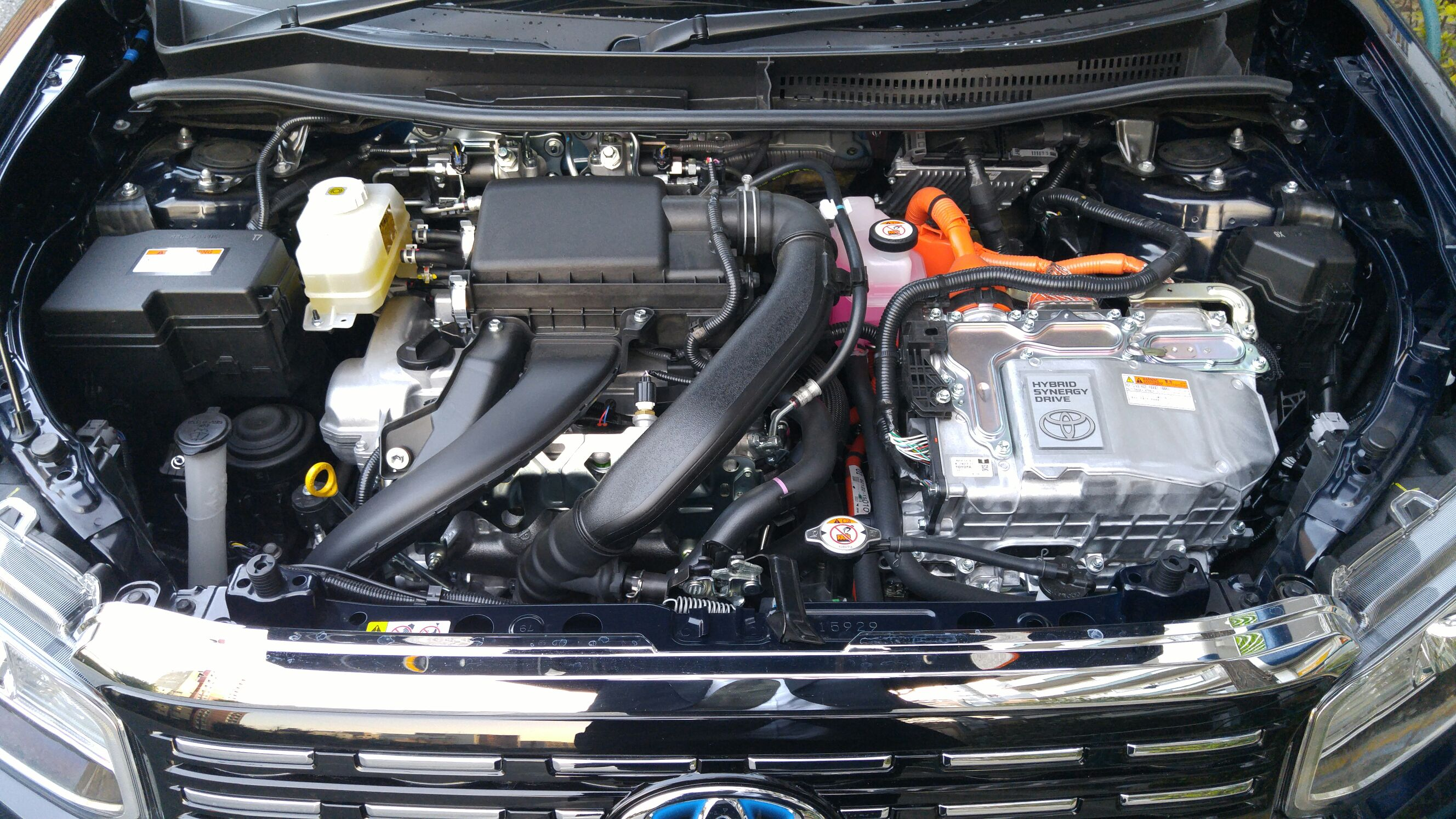
1NZ-FXP engine with 2LM motor

The powertrain is based on Toyota's THS II hybrid system. The engine, a 1.5L 1NZ-FXP, is compatible with LPG fuel and uses a maintenance-free electric water pump. The hybrid system's nickel-metal hydride battery is flat, being situated under the floor.

=== Safety ===
The JPN Taxi is equipped with 6 SRS airbags (driver, passenger, front side & curtain) as standard, as well as Toyota Safety Sense anti-collision sensors. It received a 5-star safety rating by the Japan New Car Assessment Program (JNCAP).

== Production and sales ==
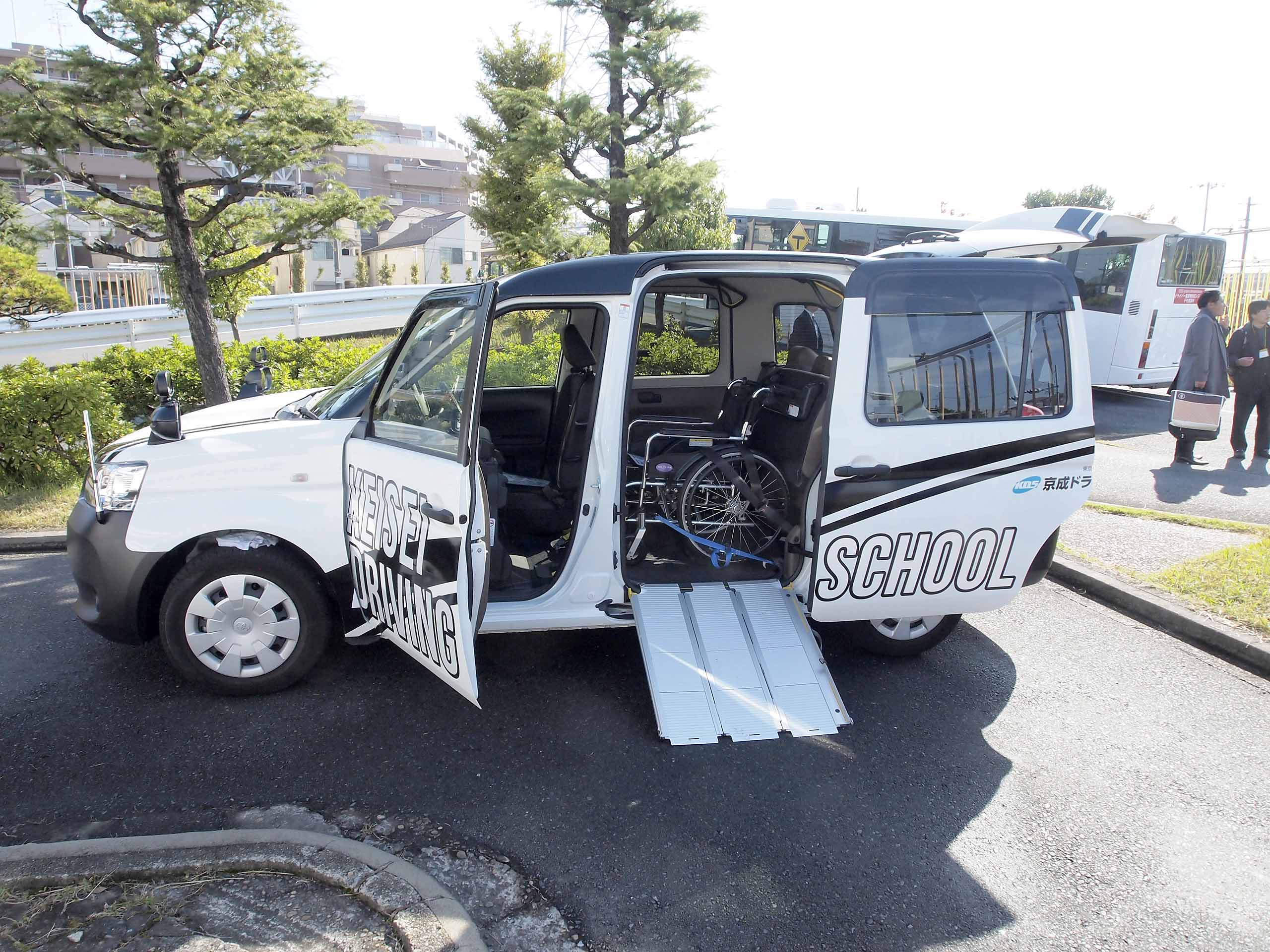
Accessibility features

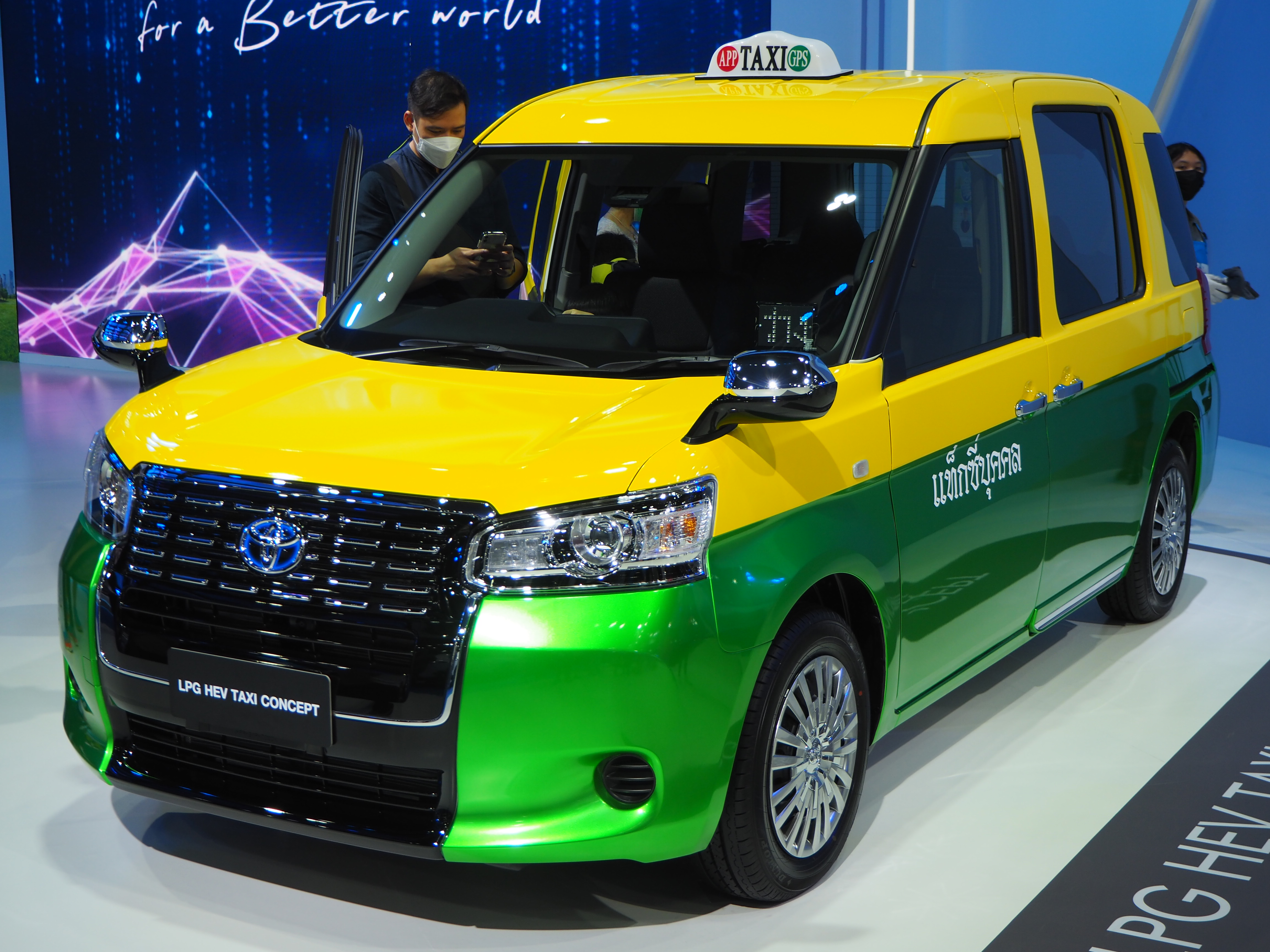
Toyota Thai Taxi concept

From 2017 to 2020, the JPN Taxi was assembled by Toyota Motor East Japan at its Higashi-Fuji plant in Susono, Shizuoka. In December 2020, Toyota Motor East Japan moved production to its Miyagi plant in Ōhira, Miyagi.

As of May 2018, the JPN Taxi accounted for around 10% of Tokyo taxis, while the traditional Toyota Comfort model accounted for around 70%. By mid-2020 (as the 2020 Summer Olympics in Tokyo were postponed to mid-2021 due to the ongoing COVID-19 pandemic), Toyota expected the JPN Taxi to account for about one third of the Tokyo fleet. Generous government subsidies help offset the cost of upgrading livery fleets, and Tokyo taxi company Hinomaru Kotsu had replaced two thirds of its 620 cars as of September 2019. Its platform-mate, the Toyota Sienta, was the 3rd best selling vehicle in Japan in 2019.

The JPN Taxi debuted in Hong Kong in July 2018 as the Toyota Comfort Hybrid (Chinese: 豐田金豐混能的士). It was officially launched in January 2019. The car is distributed by Crown Motors. As of May 2019, 17 Comfort Hybrids are in service and are due to replace the Crown LPG taxis used in Hong Kong. Four of the taxis were brought to Hong Kong initially for research and field testing before they were adopted into service.

In March 2023, Toyota Thailand proposed the Toyota Thai Taxi as an alternative energy vehicle-based taxi. This is a rebadged version of the JPN Taxi.

== See also ==
- Mercedes Benz Vito London Taxi
- VPG Standard Taxi
