= Limo (name) =

Limo is a name of Kalenjin origin. People with that name include:

- Benjamin Limo (born 1974), Kenyan long-distance runner and 2005 World Champion over 5000 metres
- Felix Limo (born 1980), Kenyan long-distance runner and Chicago and London marathon winner
- Philemon Limo (born 1985), Kenyan long-distance runner competing in 10K races
- Remmy Limo (born 1971), Kenyan triple jumper
- Richard Limo (born 1980, Kenyan long-distance runner and 2001 World Champion over 5000 metres
