= Mazda Familia =

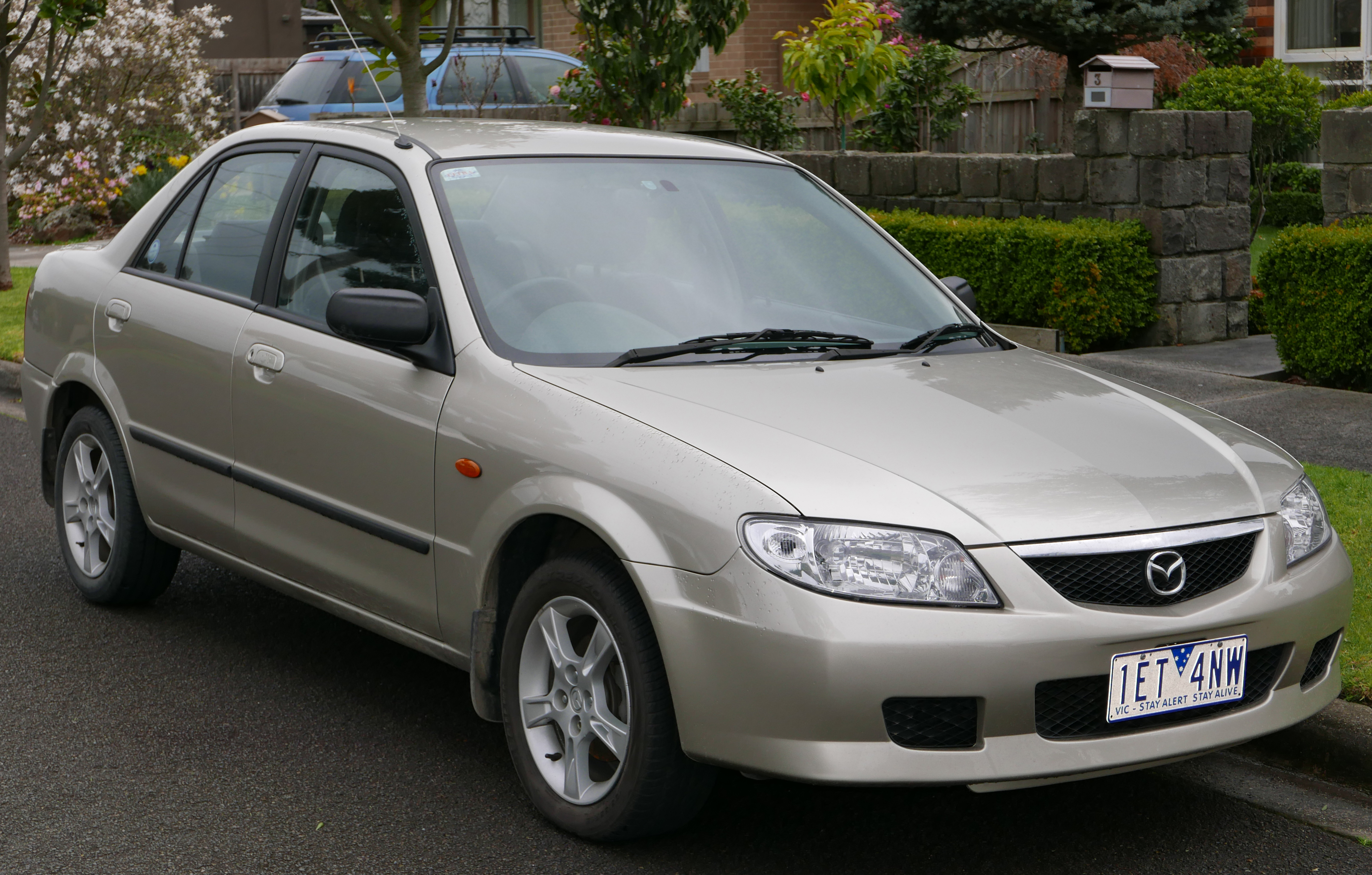
- 2003 Mazda 323 (BJ) saloon

Overview
- Manufacturer: Mazda
- Production: 1963–2003

Body and chassis
- Class: Compact (C)
- Layout: Front-engine, rear-wheel-drive (1963–1980); Front-engine, front-wheel-drive (1980–2003)

Chronology
- Successor: Mazda Familia Wagon (BG generation, station wagon version); Mazda3/Mazda Axela

The Mazda Familia (Japanese: マツダ ファミリア, Matsuda Famiria), also marketed prominently as the Mazda 323, Mazda Protegé and Mazda Allegro, is a small family car that was manufactured by Mazda between 1963 and 2003. The Familia line was replaced by the Mazda3/Axela for 2004.

It was marketed as the Familia in Japan, which means "family" in Latin. For export, earlier models were sold with nameplates including: "800", "1000", "1200", and "1300". In North America, the 1200 was replaced by the Mazda GLC, with newer models becoming "323" and "Protegé". In Europe, all Familias sold after 1977 were called "323".

The Familia was also rebranded as the Ford Laser and Ford Meteor in Asia, Oceania, Southern Africa, some Latin American countries and, from 1991, as the Ford Escort and Mercury Tracer in North America. In addition, the Familia name was used as the Mazda Familia Wagon/Van, a badge-engineered version of the Nissan AD wagon (1994–2017) and Toyota Probox (2018–present).

Mazda Familias were manufactured in the Hiroshima Plant and also assembled from "knock-down kits" in various countries including Taiwan, Indonesia, Malaysia, South Africa, Zimbabwe, Colombia, and New Zealand. Some of these plants kept manufacturing the Familia long after it was discontinued at home.

== First generation (1963) ==
First generation
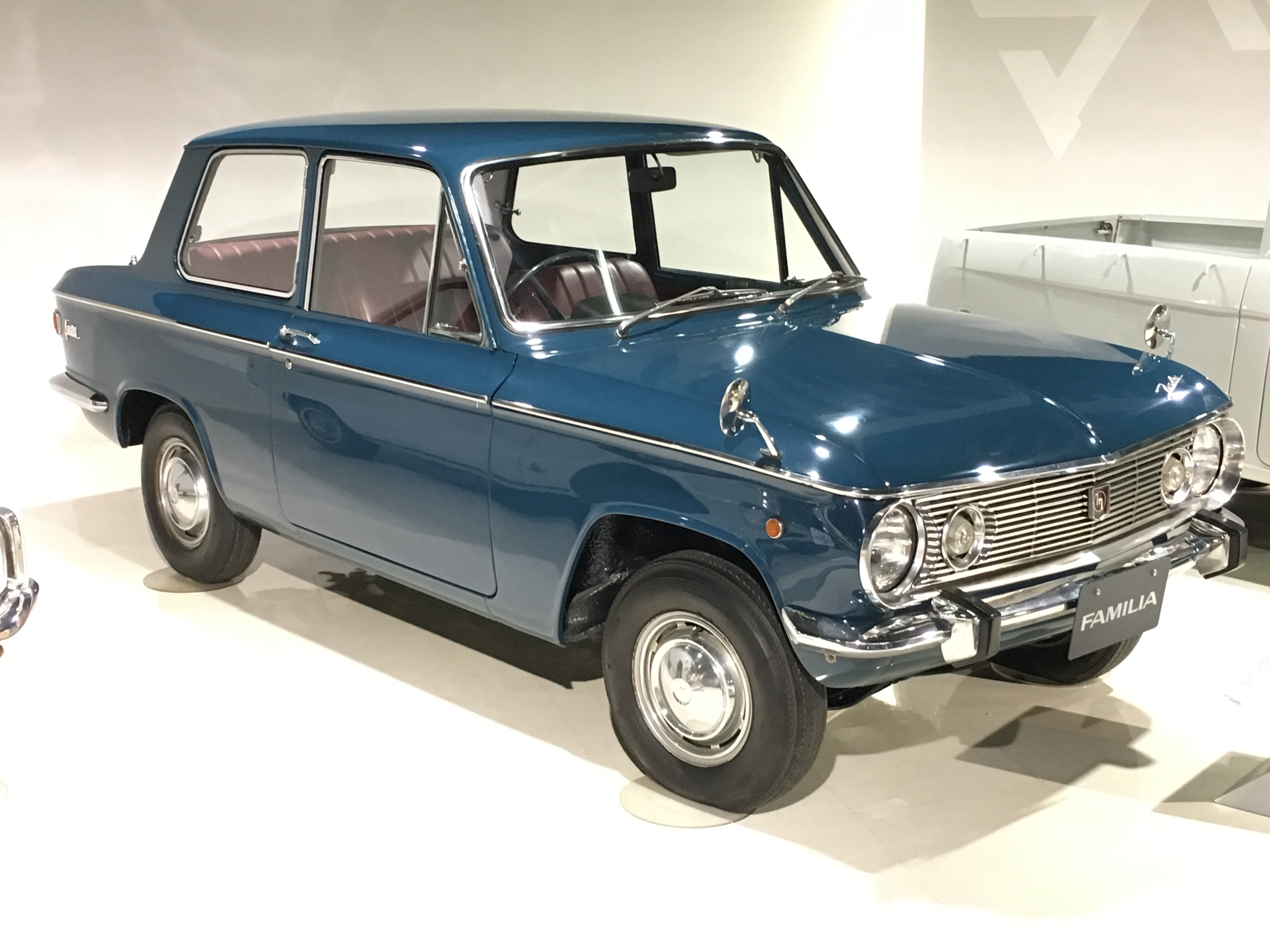
- 1963–1967 Mazda Familia 800 2-door saloon (SSA)

Overview
- Also called: Mazda 800/1000
- Production: 1963.10–1968.02
- Assembly: Japan: Hiroshima Assembly, Hiroshima
- Designer: Giorgetto Giugiaro at Bertone

Body and chassis
- Body style: 2/4-door saloon; 2-door coupé; 3-door wagon/van; 2-door pickup; 3-door box van
- Layout: Front-engine, rear-wheel-drive

Powertrain
- Engine: 782 cc SA OHV I4; 985 cc PC SOHC I4 (coupé); 987 cc PB OHV I4
- Transmission: 2-speed automatic transmission (saloon only); 4-speed manual transmission

Dimensions
- Wheelbase: 2,140 mm (84 in) (van/wagon); 2,190 mm (86 in) (saloon/coupé); 2,340 mm (92 in) (pickup/box van)
- Length: 3,635 mm (143 in) (van/wagon); 3,700 mm (146 in) (coupé); 3,700–3,765 mm (146–148 in) (saloon); 3,820 mm (150 in) (pickup); 3,840 mm (151 in) (box van)
- Width: 1,465 mm (58 in); 1,475 mm (58 in) (box van)
- Height: 1,340 mm (53 in) (coupé); 1,385 mm (55 in) (saloon); 1,390–1,395 mm (55–55 in) (wagon/van); 1,450 mm (57 in) (pickup); 1,770 mm (70 in) (box van)
- Curb weight: 715–865 kg (1,576–1,907 lb)

Mazda's automotive plans for the early sixties consisted of growing alongside the Japanese economy. To achieve this goal, they began by building an extremely affordable kei car, the R360 in 1960, planning on introducing gradually larger and pricier cars as the Japanese customers became able to afford them. As a preview, testing the waters, a larger "Mazda 700" prototype was shown at the eighth Tokyo Motor Show in 1961, and formed the basis for the upcoming Mazda Familia. Meanwhile, the four door version of the R360 was introduced as the Mazda Carol, which appeared in 1962, and discontinued in 1964.

The first production Familia, styled by a young Giorgetto Giugiaro while working at Carrozzeria Bertone, appeared in October 1963. In line with Mazda's policy of only gradually approaching the production of private cars (a luxury in Japan at the time), the first Familia was initially only available as a commercial two-door wagon called the Familia van. The van was joined in April 1964 by a plusher Familia wagon, in October by a four-door saloon, and in November by a two-door saloon. The "flat deck" design of the saloon versions was reportedly inspired by the Chevrolet Corvair. Private car versions received foglights in the grille as well as more chrome trim. The Familia was sold in other markets as the 800.

The Familia was introduced to the Japanese market in time for the 1964 Summer Olympics which began in October.

The cars used a 782 cc, "SA" four-stroke aluminum straight-four engine, also known as the "white engine". There was also a pickup version available from November 1964, while a box van (called a "panel van" by Mazda) was added in early or middle 1965.

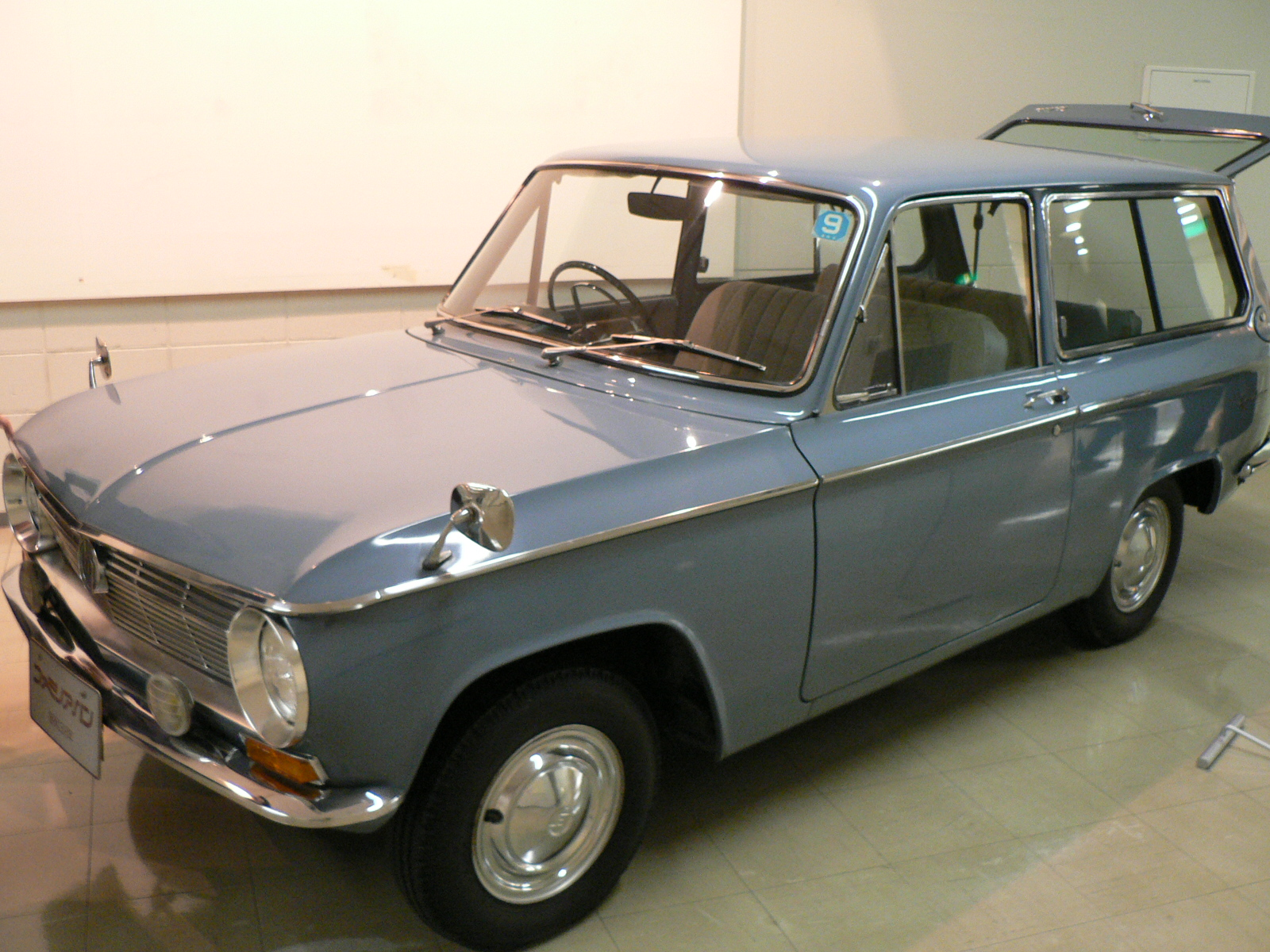
Familia 800 van (BSAVD)

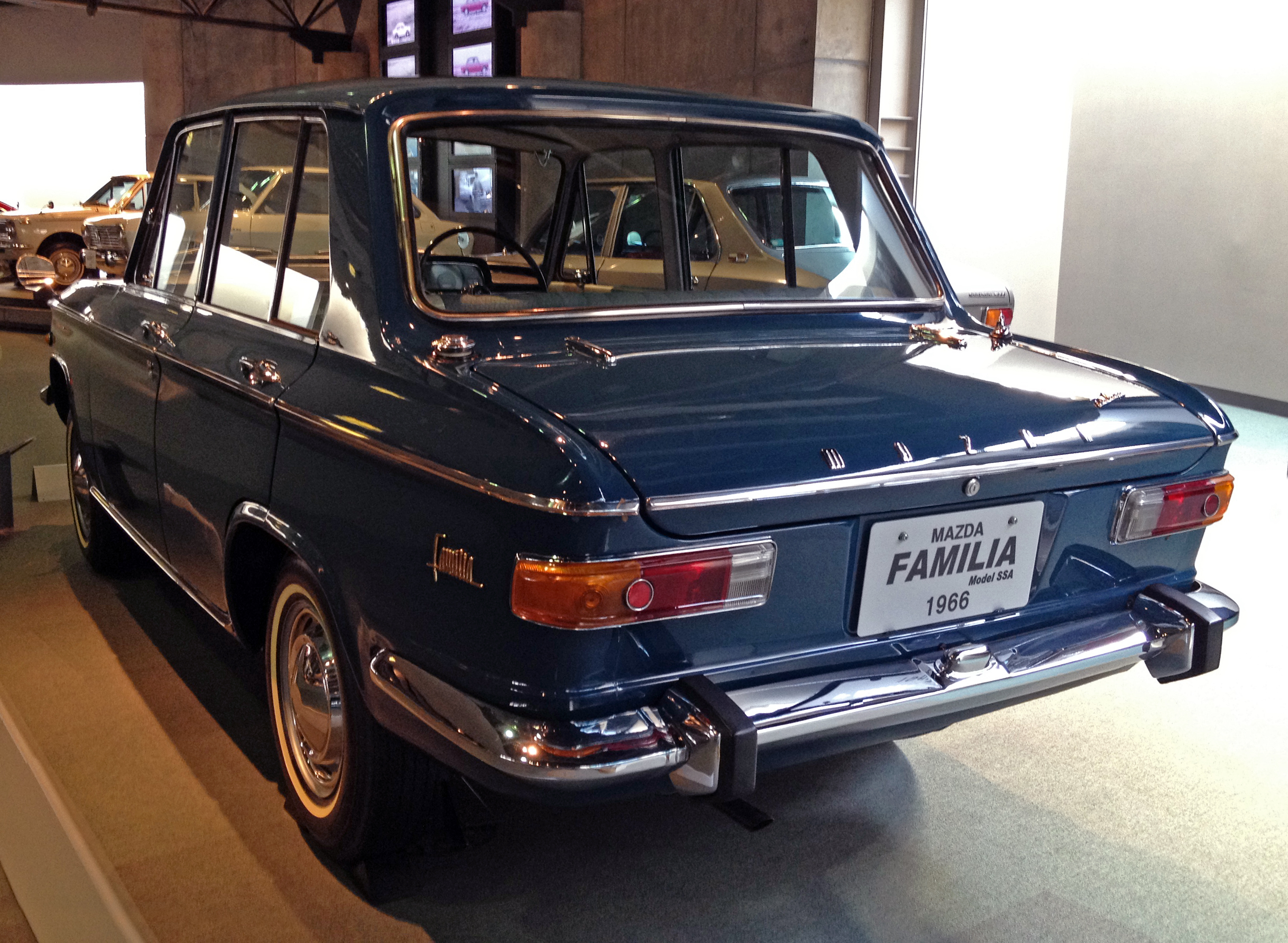
Familia 800 4-door saloon (SSA)

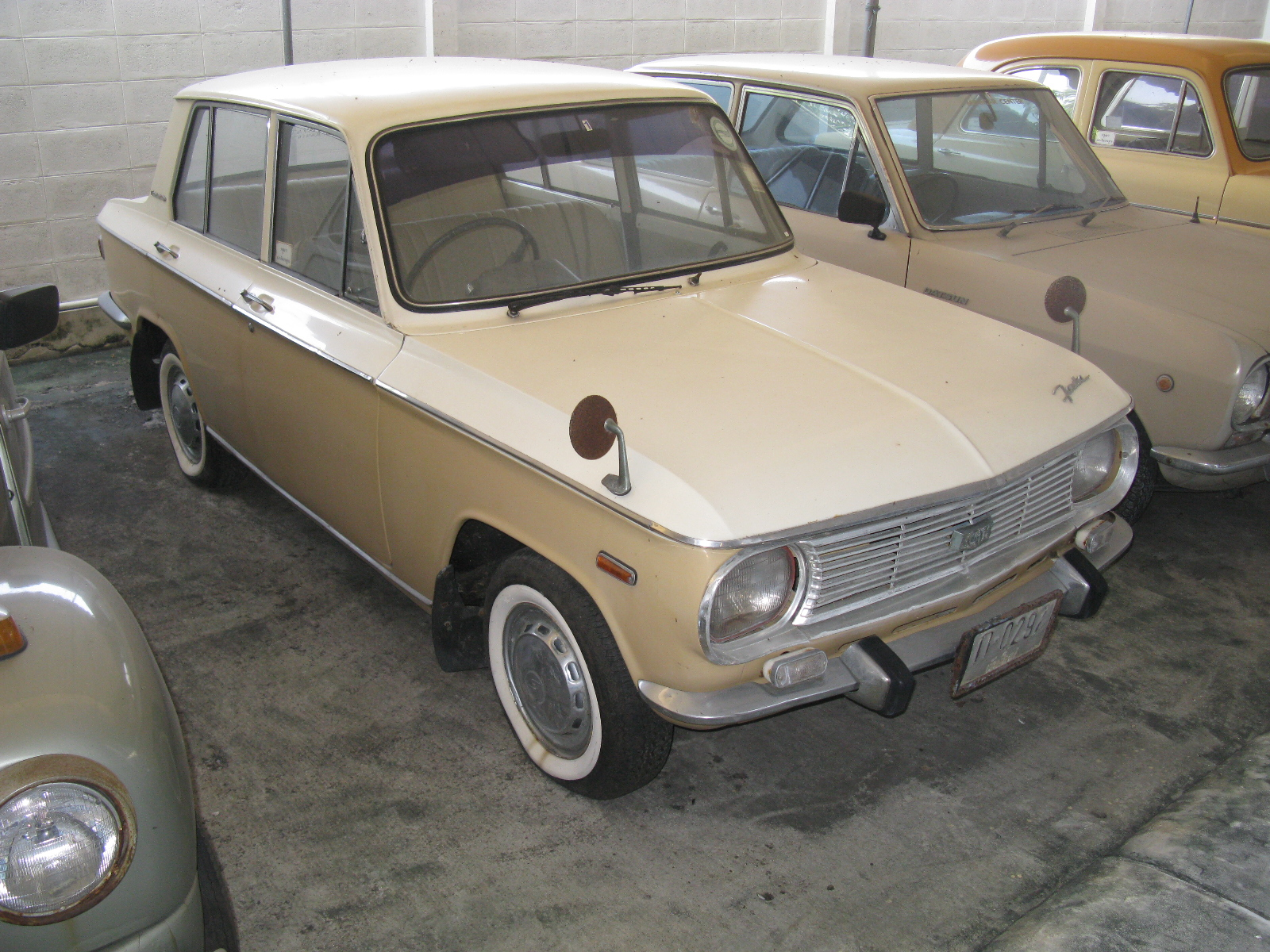
Mazda Familia 1000 DeLuxe 4-door saloon (1967)

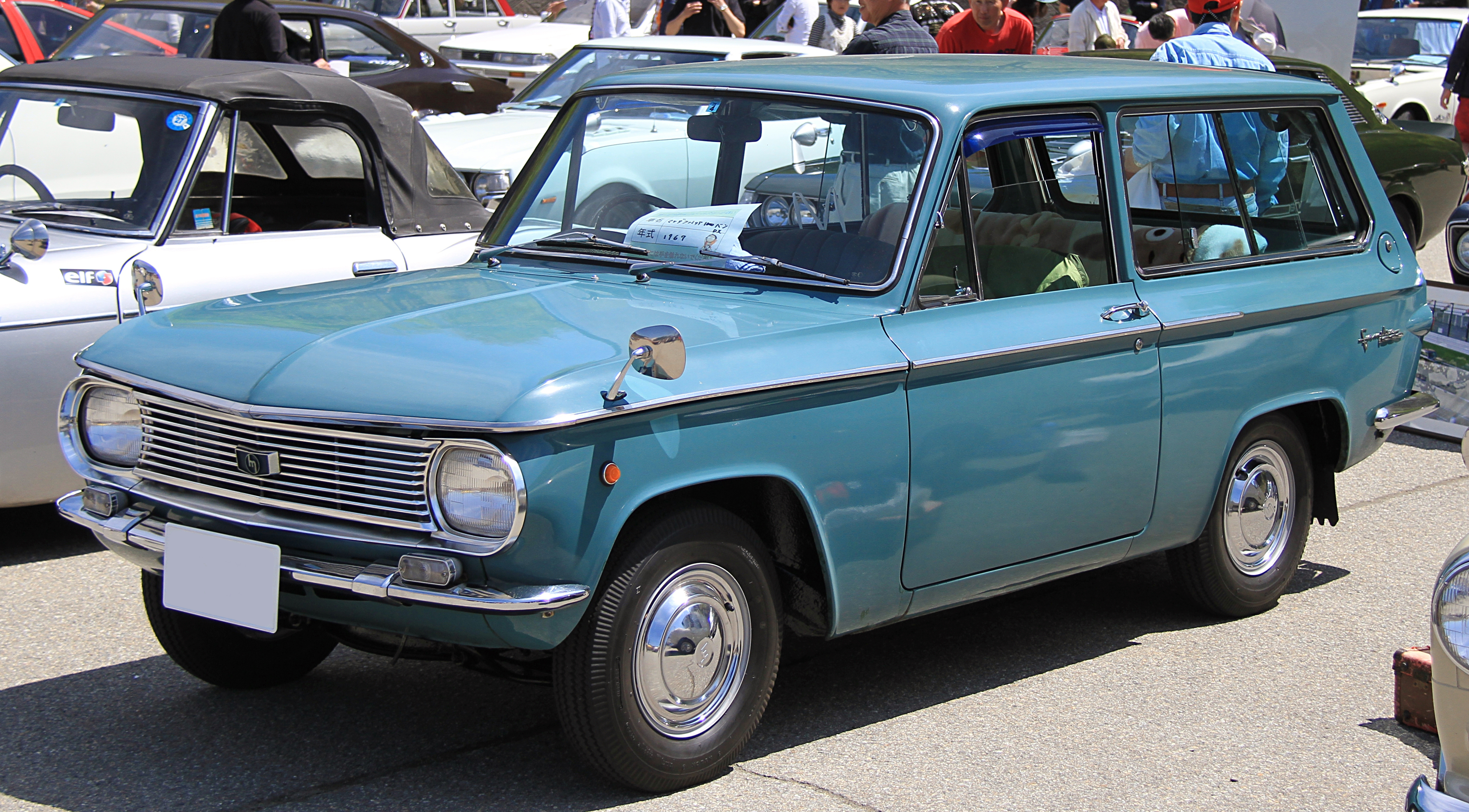
Mazda Familia 1000 van (BPAV; 1967)

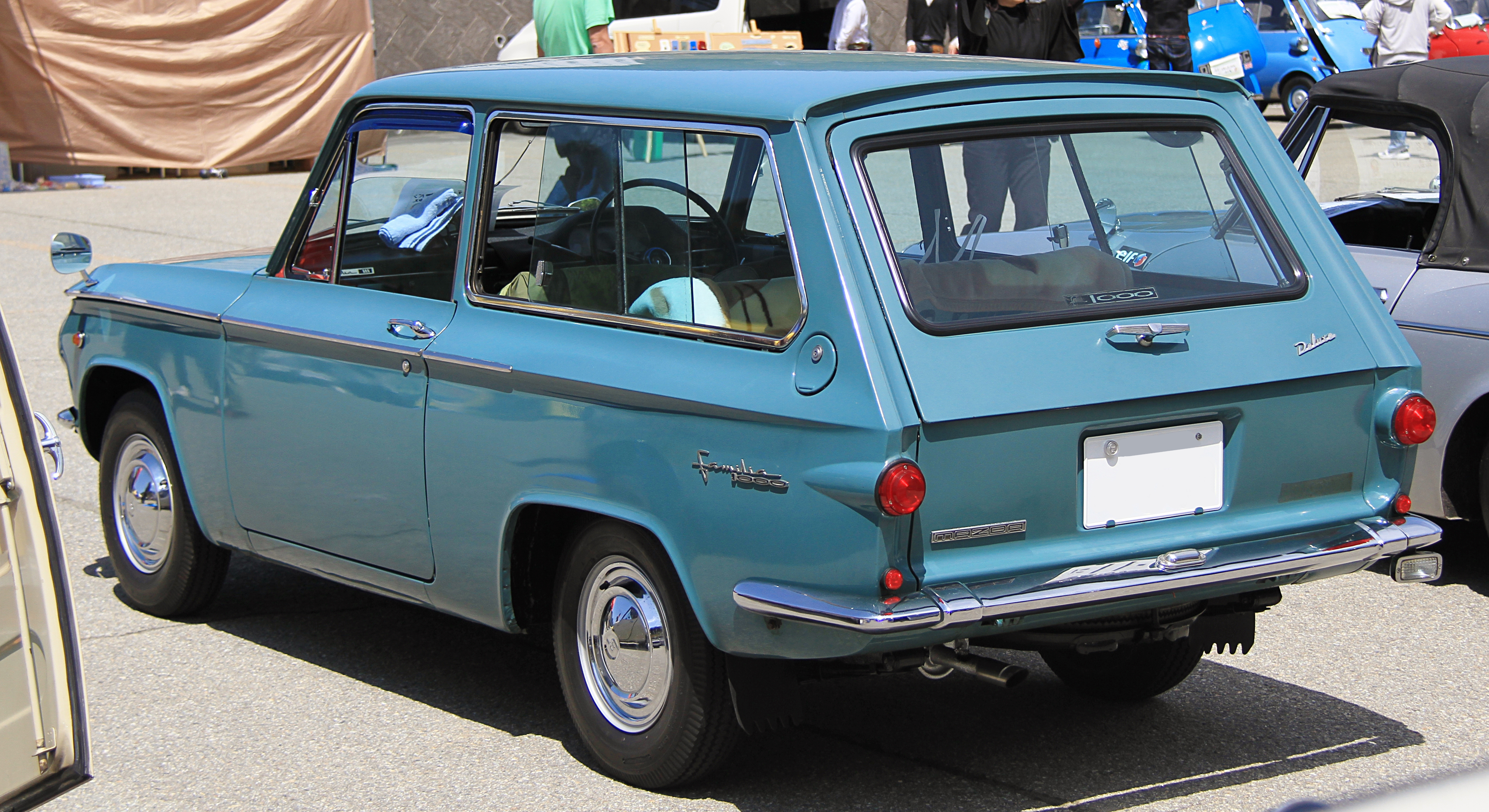
Familia 1000 van, rear view

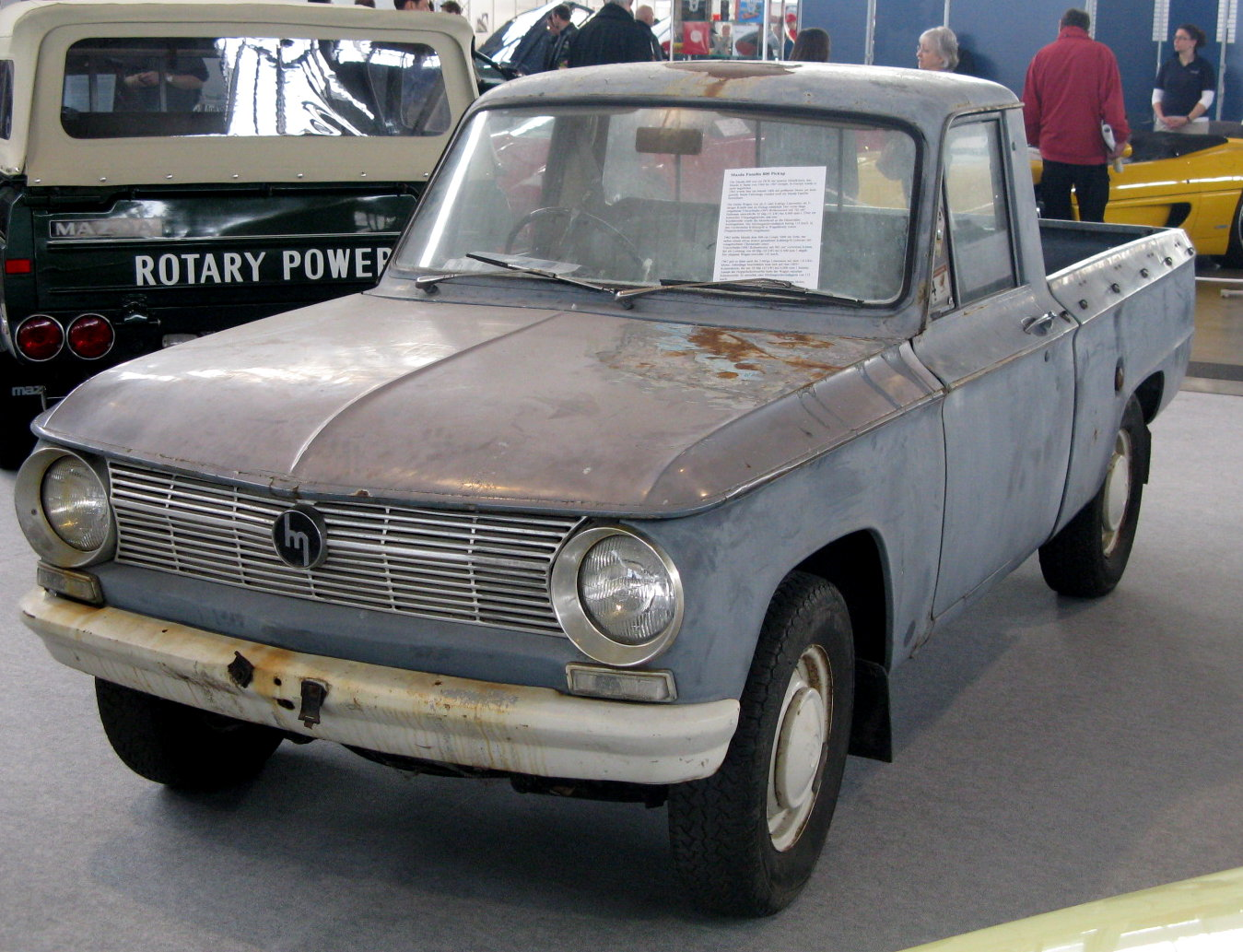
Mazda Familia 800 pickup (BSA55)

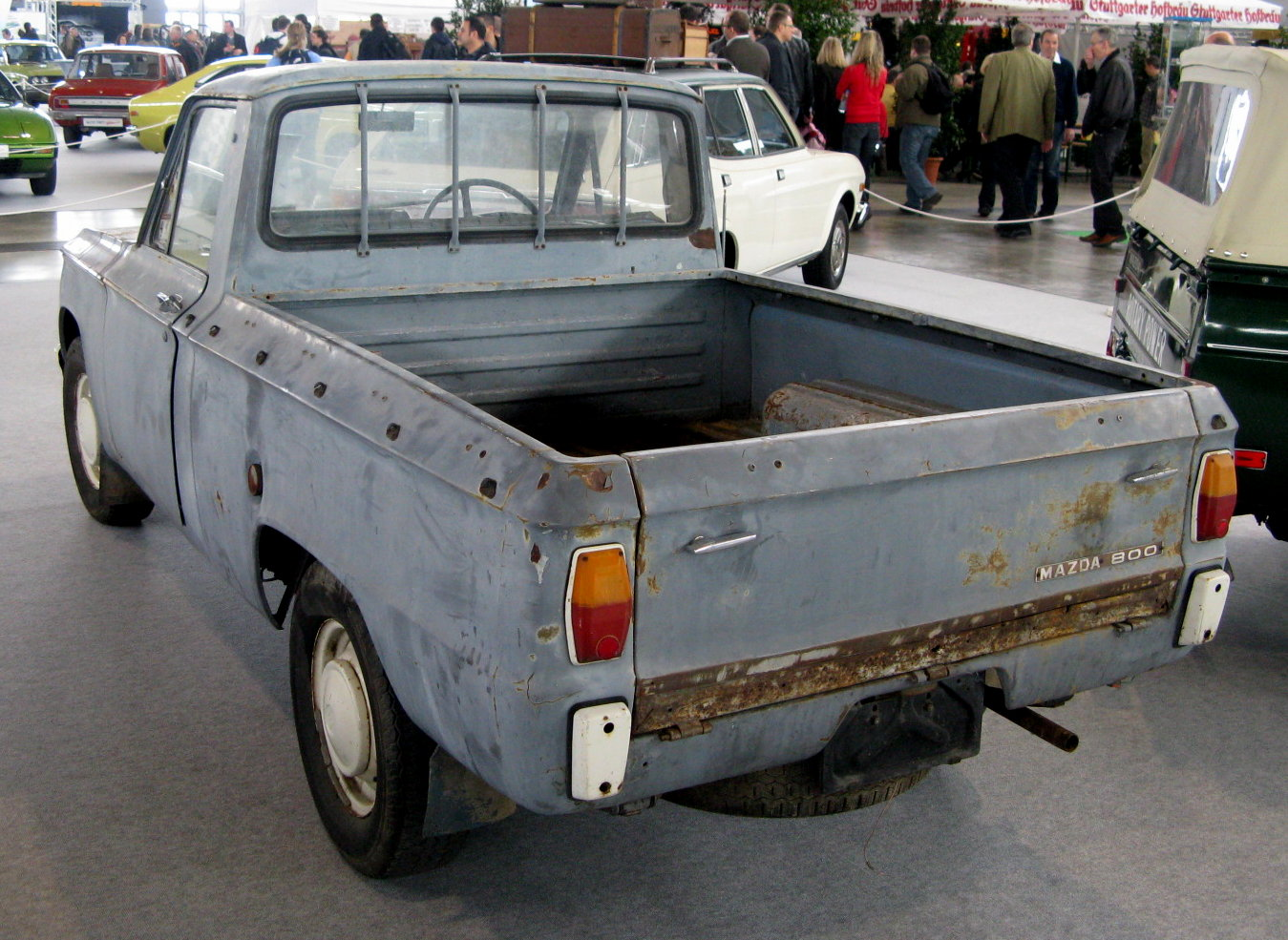
Rear view of pickup

A new Familia 1000 coupé arrived in November 1965, with a 985 cc SOHC "PC" engine, and was joined by the larger Mazda Luce in 1966. Around the same time, the 800 engine was upgraded, adding three horsepower. As a number of new 1-litre vehicles were introduced by Mazda's competitors, another 987 cc OHV engine (PB) appeared in January 1967, powering new 1000 saloon and van versions. The 1-litre saloons and vans are recognizable by their broader, rounded-off rectangular headlights. Production of the saloon continued until November 1967, while the van versions continued until they were replaced in February 1968. Around 400,000 of the first Familias were built, 130,473 of which were saloons and coupés. Around 10,000 of the first generation Familias were exported, mainly to Australia and Oceania.

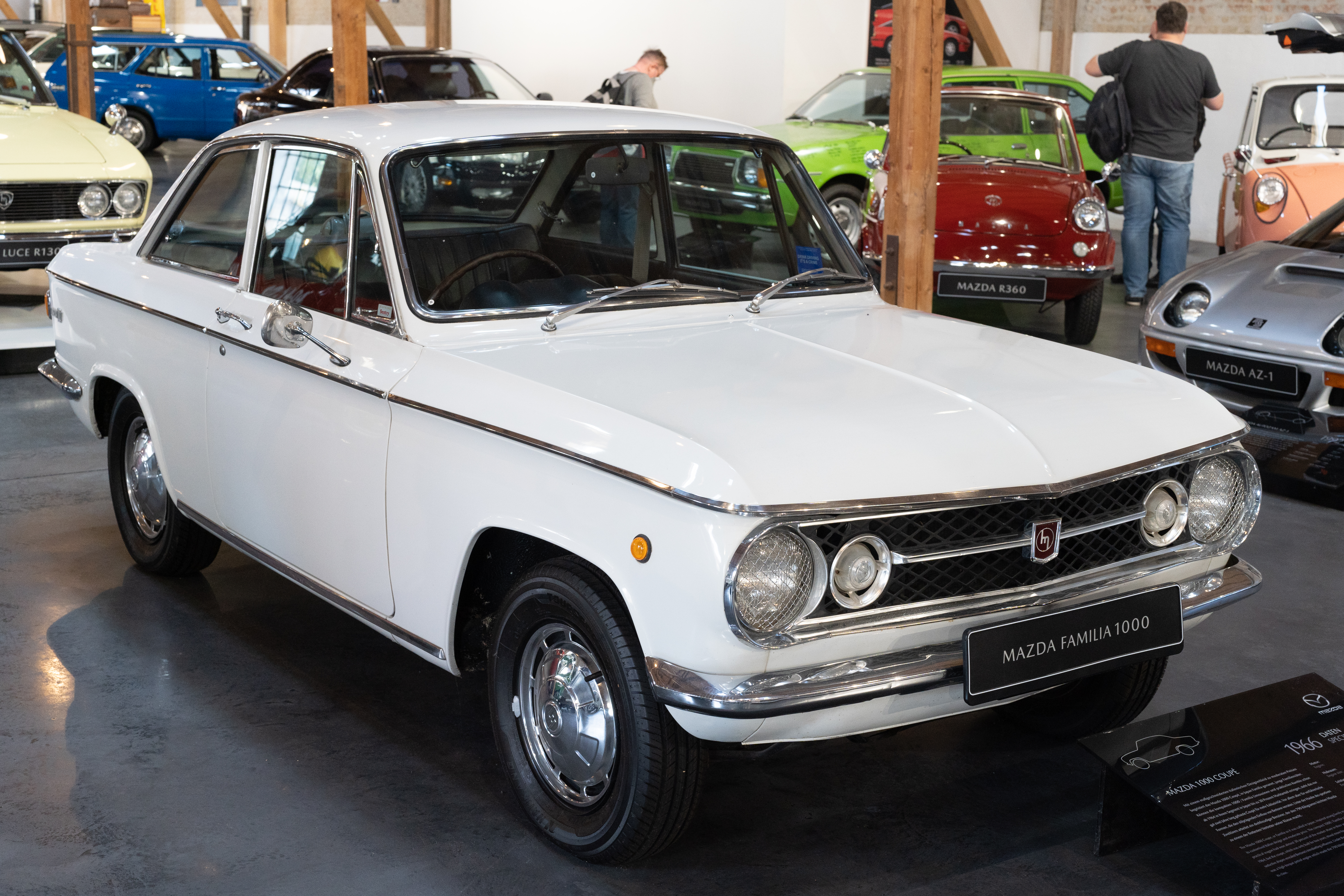
Mazda Familia 1000 coupé (MPA; 1966)

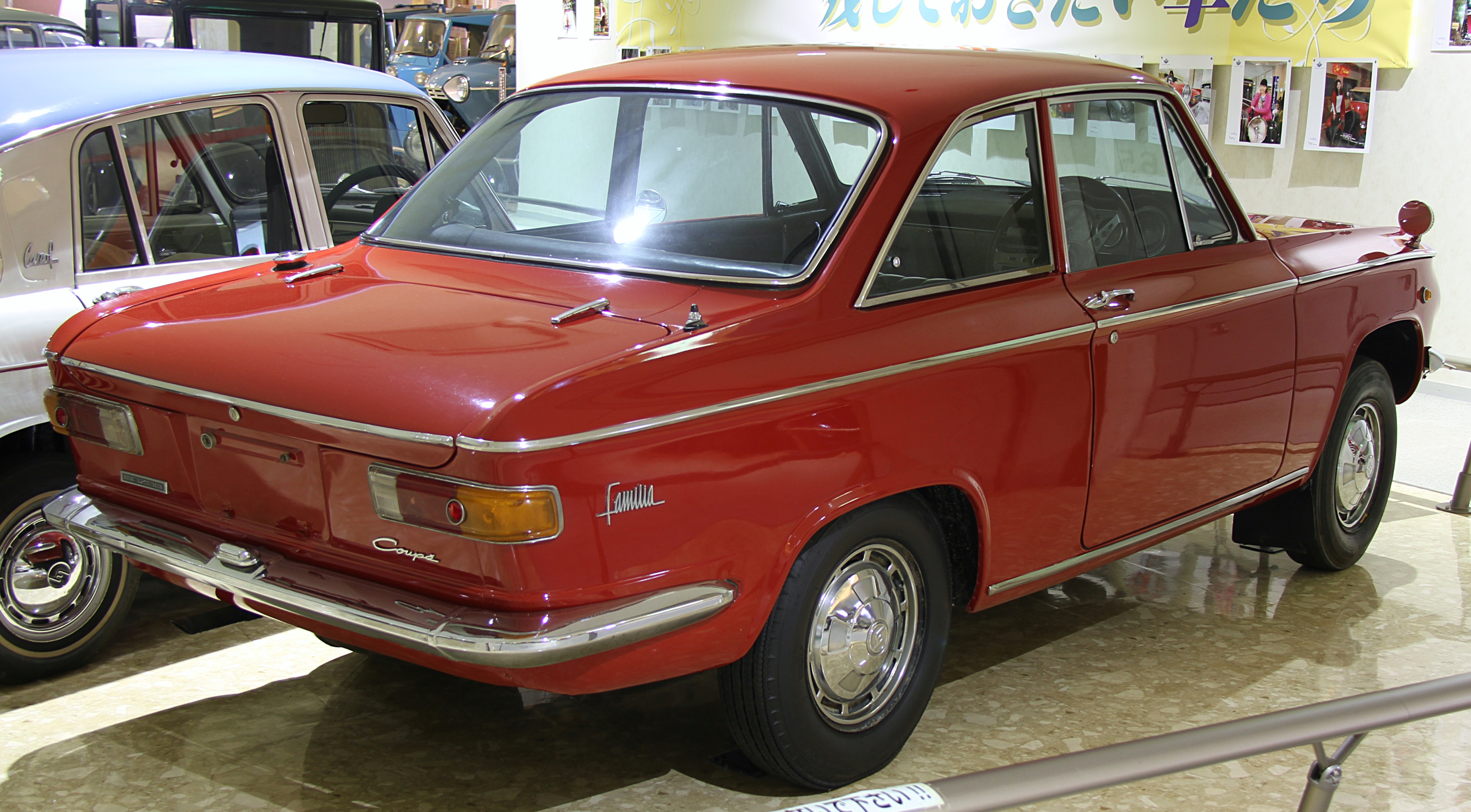
Mazda Familia 1000 coupé, rear view (MPA; 1965)

Data

Primary sources below are listed at the head of each column, information sourced elsewhere is referenced directly in the relevant cells. Data is for models as marketed in the Japanese domestic market.

Mazda Familia (1st generation)
| | Familia (800) van and wagon | Familia 800 saloon | Familia 1000 van | Familia 1000 saloon | Familia 1000 coupé |
|---|---|---|---|---|---|
| Layout | Front engine, rear-wheel drive | | | | |
| Transmission | 4-speed manual | 4MT, 2-spd automatic | 4-speed manual | 4MT, 2-spd automatic | 4-speed manual |
| Suspension F/R | Coil sprung independent by double wishbones / Live axle and semi-elliptic leaf springs | | | | |
| Brakes F/R | drums / drums | | | discs / drums | |
| Wheelbase | 2,140 mm (84.3 in) | 2,190 mm (86.2 in) | 2,140 mm (84.3 in) | 2,190 mm (86.2 in) | |
| Length | 3,635 mm (143.1 in) | 3,700 mm (145.7 in); DX: 3,765 mm (148.2 in) | 3,635 mm (143.1 in) | 3,700 mm (145.7 in); DX: 3,765 mm (148.2 in) | 3,700 mm (145.7 in) |
| Width | 1,465 mm (57.7 in) | | | | |
| Height | 1,390 mm (54.7 in) | 1,385 mm (54.5 in) | 1,395 mm (54.9 in) | 1,385 mm (54.5 in) | 1,340 mm (52.8 in) |
| Empty weight | Van: 715 kg (1,576 lb); Wagon: 760 kg (1,676 lb) | 720 kg (1,587 lb); DX: 745 kg (1,642 lb) | 725 kg (1,598 lb) (deLuxe) | 720 kg (1,587 lb); DX: 740 kg (1,631 lb) | 790 kg (1,742 lb) |
| Engine | SA | | PB | | PC |
| Engine | Water-cooled OHV inline-4, two valves per cylinder | | | | SOHC inline-4 |
| Displacement | 782 cc (58.0 x 74.0 mm) | | 987 cc (68.0 x 68.0 mm) | | 985 cc (70.0 x 64.0 mm) |
| Compression | 8.5:1 (1966–67: 9.0:1) | | 8.6:1 | | 10.0:1 |
| Power (SAE) | 42 PS (31 kW; 41 hp) at 6,000 rpm 1966–67: 45 PS (33 kW; 44 hp) | | 52 PS (38 kW; 51 hp) at 5,500 rpm | 58 PS (43 kW; 57 hp) at 6,000 rpm | 68 PS (50 kW; 67 hp) at 6,500 rpm |
| Torque | 6.0 kg⋅m (59 N⋅m; 43 lb⋅ft) at 3,200 rpm 1966–67: 6.3 kg⋅m (62 N⋅m; 46 lb⋅ft) at 3,200 rpm | | 8.0 kg⋅m (78 N⋅m; 58 lb⋅ft) at 3,000 rpm | 7.9 kg⋅m (77 N⋅m; 57 lb⋅ft) at 3,500 rpm | 8.1 kg⋅m (79 N⋅m; 59 lb⋅ft) at 4,600 rpm |
| Top speed | 105 km/h (65 mph) | 115 km/h (71 mph) | 125 km/h (78 mph) | 135 km/h (84 mph) | 145 km/h (90 mph) |
| Tires | Wagon: 6.00 x 12 4PR; Van (f): 5.00 x 12 4PR; Van (r): 5.00 x 12 6PR | 6.00 x 12 4PR | front: 5.00 x 12 4PR rear: 5.00 x 12 6PR | 6.00 x 12 4PR | 6.15 x 13 4PR |

== Second generation (FA2/FA3; 1967) ==
Second generation (FA2/FA3 series 1)
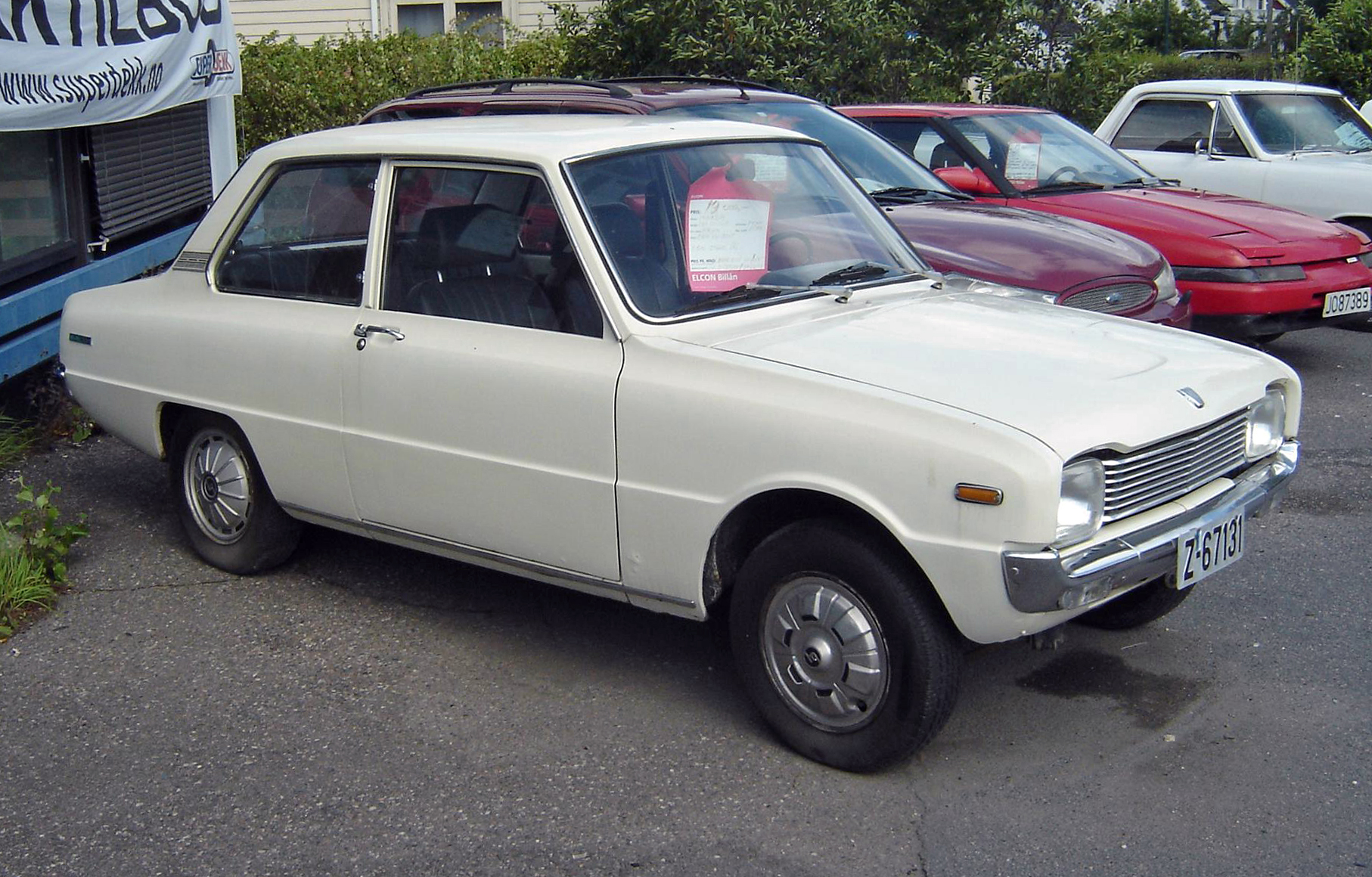
- 1967–1970 Mazda 1000 2-door saloon (Europe)

Overview
- Also called: Mazda 1000/1200/1300; Mazda F-1000/1300 (pickup); Mazda R100 (Rotary engined coupé); Mazda Marella (Finland); Kia Brisa (South Korea); Kia Master 1000/1200/1300 (pickup, South Korea)
- Production: 1967–1973 (up until 1977 for wagon/van and late 1990s for the pickup); 1974–1981 (South Korea)
- Assembly: Japan: Hiroshima (Mazda factory); South Korea: Hwaseong (Kia Motors); South Africa: Durban (Illings Mazda (Pty) Ltd)

Body and chassis
- Body style: 2/4-door saloon; 2-door coupé; 3/5-door wagon/van; 2-door pickup; 3-door box van
- Layout: Front-engine, rear-wheel-drive

Powertrain
- Engine: petrol: 982 cc 10A rotary; 985 cc PC I4 (MP3/SP3); 987 cc PB I4 (BPC/BPB); 1169 cc TB I4 (BTA, pre-facelift); 1272 cc TC I4 (MT2/ST2); 1415 cc UC I4 (Thailand); LPG: 985 cc PC I4 (Kia Brisa Taxi, 1974-77); 1272 cc TC I4 (Kia Brisa Taxi, 1977-81)
- Transmission: 4-speed manual transmission; 3-speed automatic transmission (JDM only)

Dimensions
- Wheelbase: 2,260 mm (89.0 in); 2,340 or 2,465 mm (92.1 or 97.0 in) (pickup)
- Length: 3,700 mm (145.7 in) (wagon/van); 3,795–3,830 mm (149.4–150.8 in) (coupé/saloon); 3,845–4,160 mm (151.4–163.8 in) (pickup)
- Width: 1,480 mm (58.3 in)
- Height: 1,345 mm (53.0 in) (coupé); 1,390 mm (54.7 in) (saloon); 1,405 mm (55.3 in) (wagon/van)
- Curb weight: 740–865 kg (1,631–1,907 lb)

=== FA2; 1967 ===
The new Familia appeared in November 1967 with the same pushrod 987 cc engine as used in the previous generation saloons. It was sold as the "Mazda 1000" in some markets. In July 1968 the rotary-engined version (R100) was introduced, along with a new coupé bodywork which was also available with the 1200 cc piston engine. After an April 1970 facelift (called the "Familia Presto" in the domestic Japanese market), the slightly different OHC "PC" 1-litre engine was also offered. A larger 1169 cc straight-four engined version came along in February 1968, becoming the "Mazda 1200" for export. In this form, the car was first exhibited in Europe at the 1968 Paris Motor Show in the autumn of that year. Power outputs (SAE gross) in Japan of the facelifted, overhead-cam-engined versions were 62 and 75 PS (46 and 55 kW) respectively. The Van (wagon) model was available with either three or five doors, although most export markets only received the five-door version.

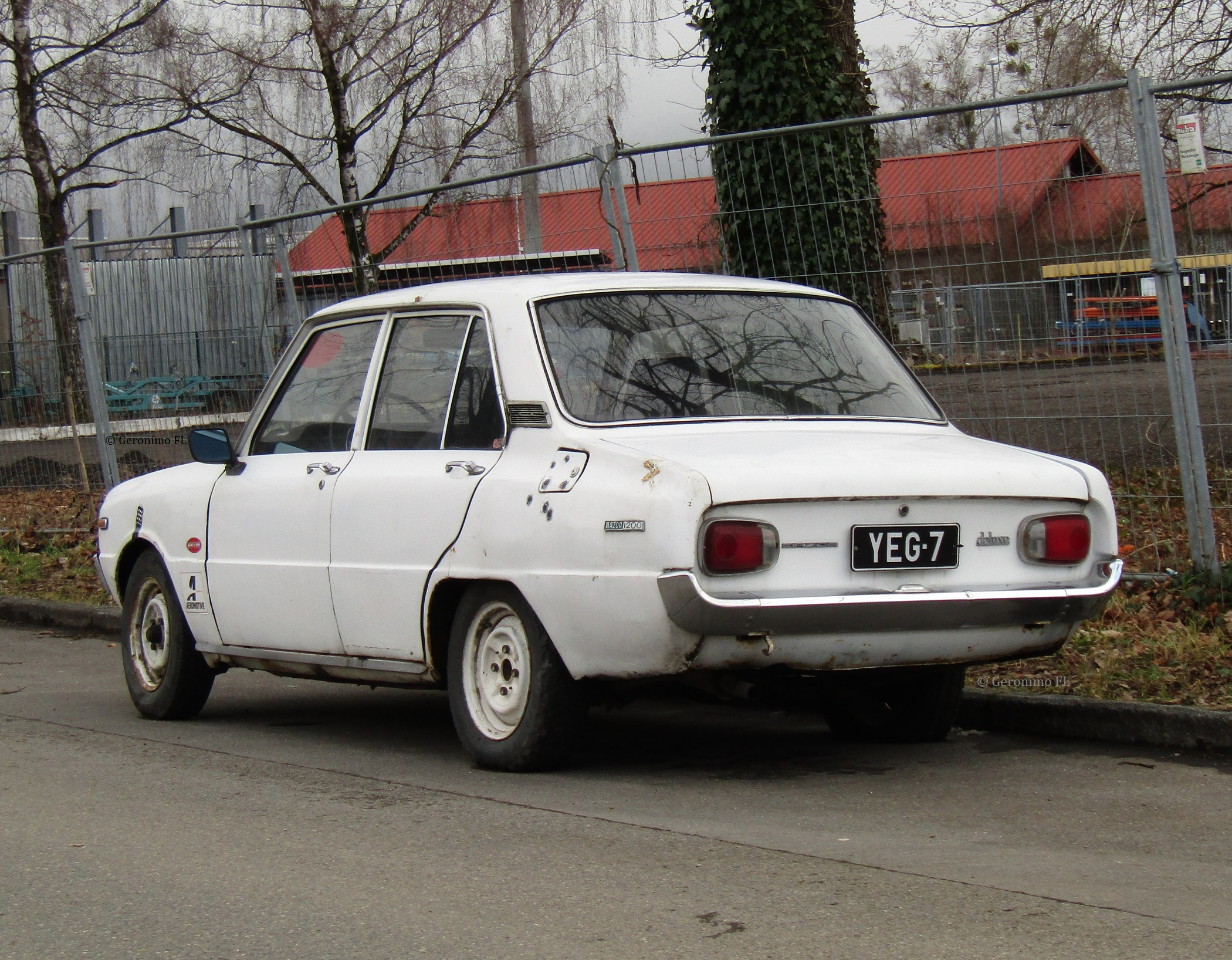
1967–1970 Mazda 1200 4-door saloon (Europe)

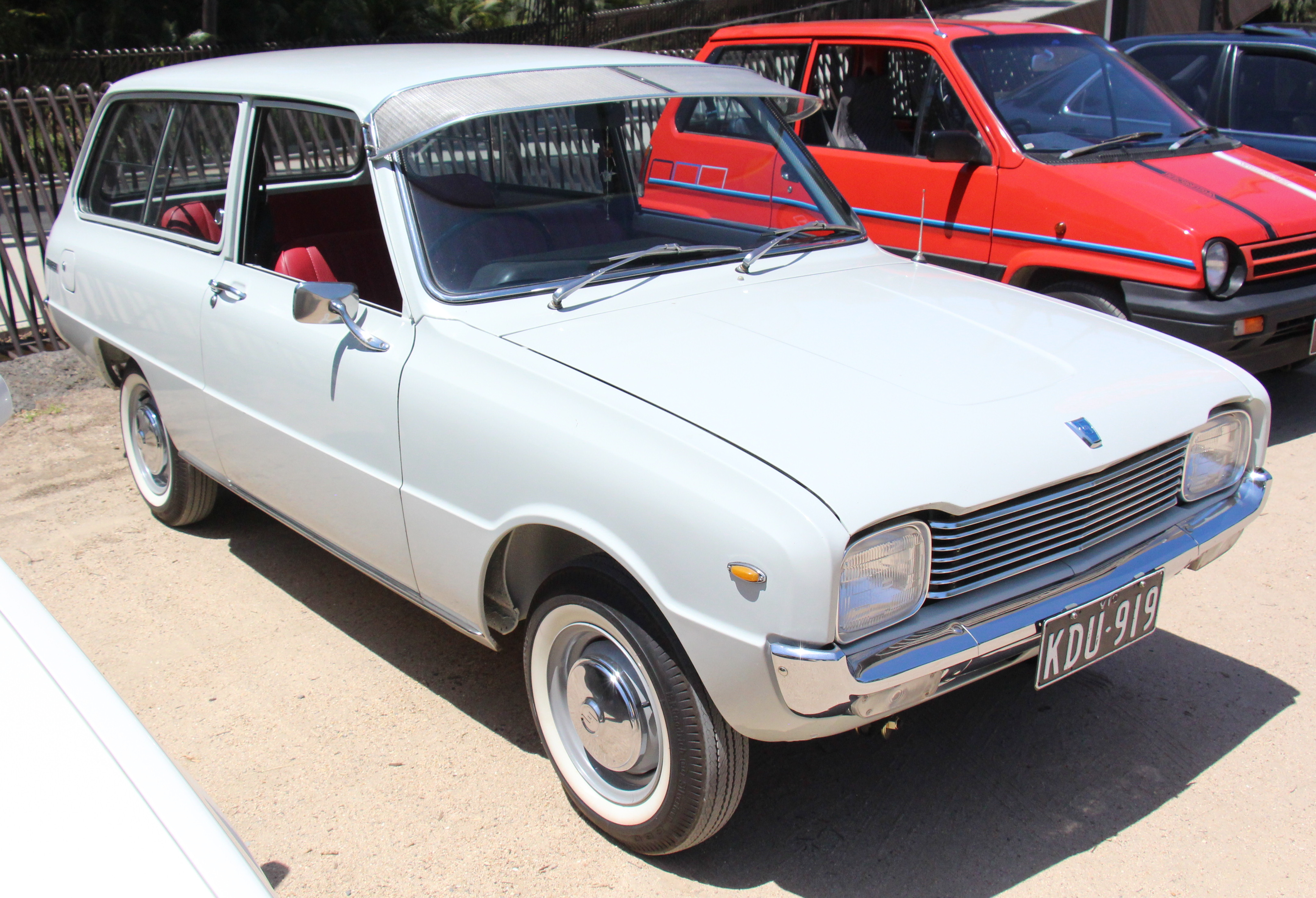
1967–1970 Mazda 1200 3-door wagon (Australia)

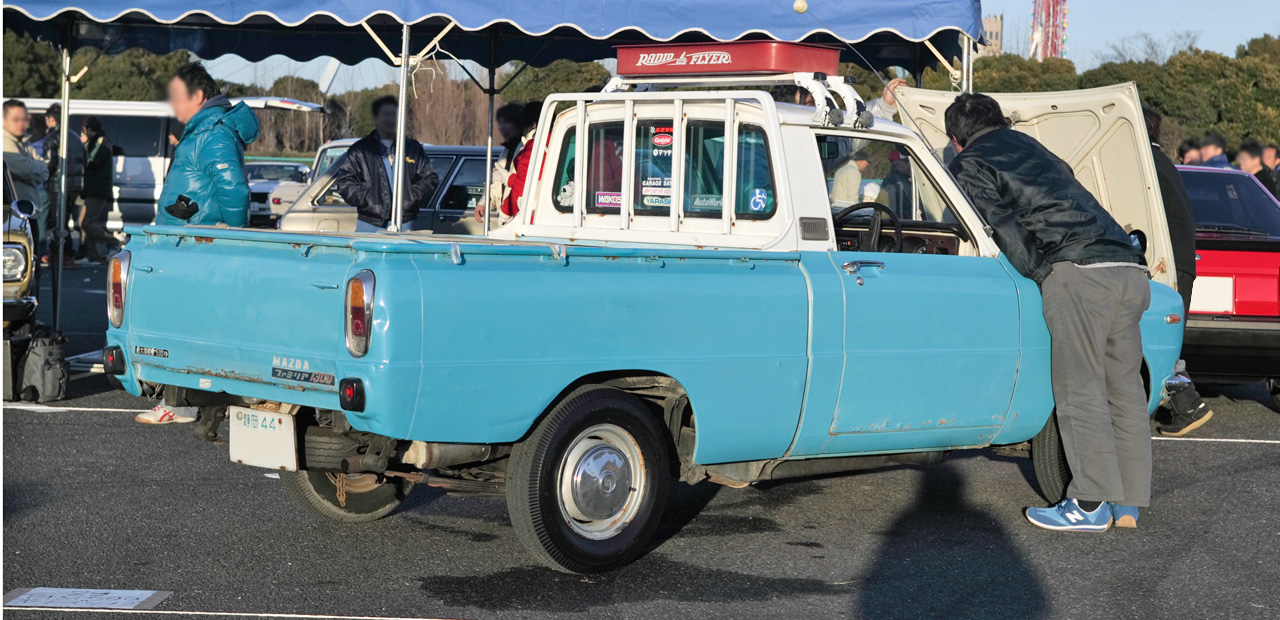
Mazda Familia 1300 pickup long bed

=== Familia Presto series 1 (FA3; 1970) ===
From April 1970, the Presto nameplate was added to the entire Familia range; "Presto" means "quick" in Italian. Brand new overhead camshaft 1.3-litre TC engine also appeared, derived from the smaller 1.0-litre OHC engine already seen in the first generation Familia coupé. At the same time, the range received a light facelift including a chrome strip around the front grille. Unlike the pickup, the vans also used the "Familia Presto" name. Chassis codes are SPCV for the 1.0-litre and STBV for the 1.3-litre model, with power outputs as for the saloon/coupé. Standard and Deluxe versions were available, with the Deluxe also offering five-door bodywork.

The Familia was exported as the "Mazda 1300", and replaced the previous generation 1200 model in most markets. In Finland, the Familia Presto was marketed as the "Mazda Marella." The saloon and coupé were updated in 1972 in Japan and in the autumn of 1973 for export market, but the pickup and wagon/van versions continued with little change. The vans and pickups actually soldiered on until 1978, by which time a wagon version of the succeeding FA4 Familia (323/GLC) had been introduced. The later pickup versions were also available in a long-wheelbase version, and still featured an 85 PS (63 kW) (SAE gross) version of the 1.3-litre TC engine, unaffected by the tighter Japanese emissions standards for passenger cars.

The "1200" was offered in the United States in 1971 and again for the 1973 model year. US-market models had round sealed-beam headlamps mounted in pill-shaped bezels fitting the original openings. The 1971 version was the first piston-powered Familia sold in the United States and arrived in two- and four-door forms alongside its rotary Mazda R100 coupé counterpart. It was replaced by the somewhat larger 808 (Grand Familia) the next year. The 1200 model returned for 1973 as the base-model economy Mazda. The company then chose to focus on performance for the next two years, dropping the economy-oriented 1200. After the gas crisis they returned to the economy sector with the Mizer in 1976, a rebadged 808/818.

Engine (US):

- 1971, 1973 – 1.2 L (1169 cc) I4, 58 hp (43 kW; 59 PS) / 69 lb⋅ft (94 N⋅m)
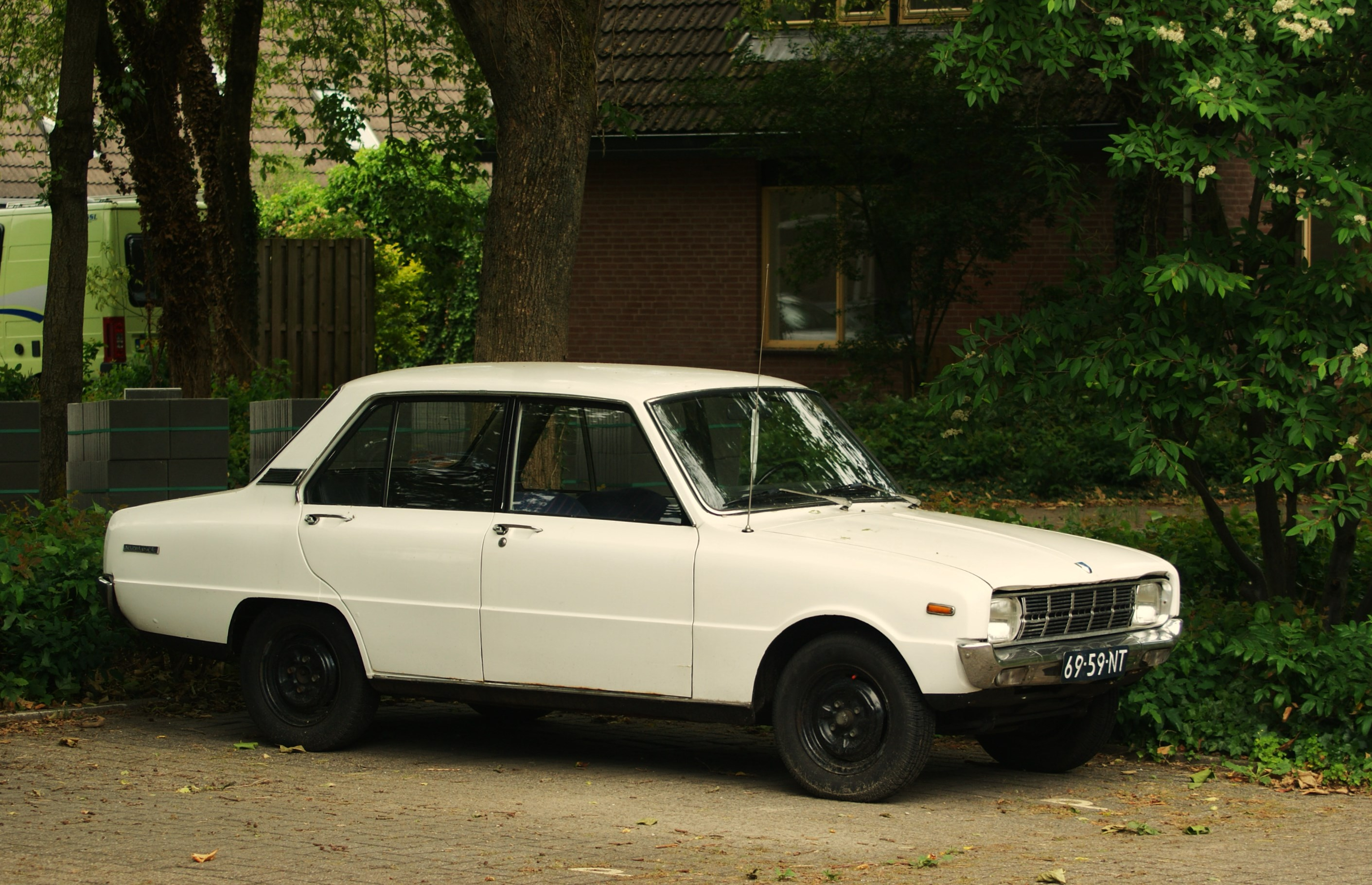
1970–1972 Mazda 1300 4-door saloon (Europe)

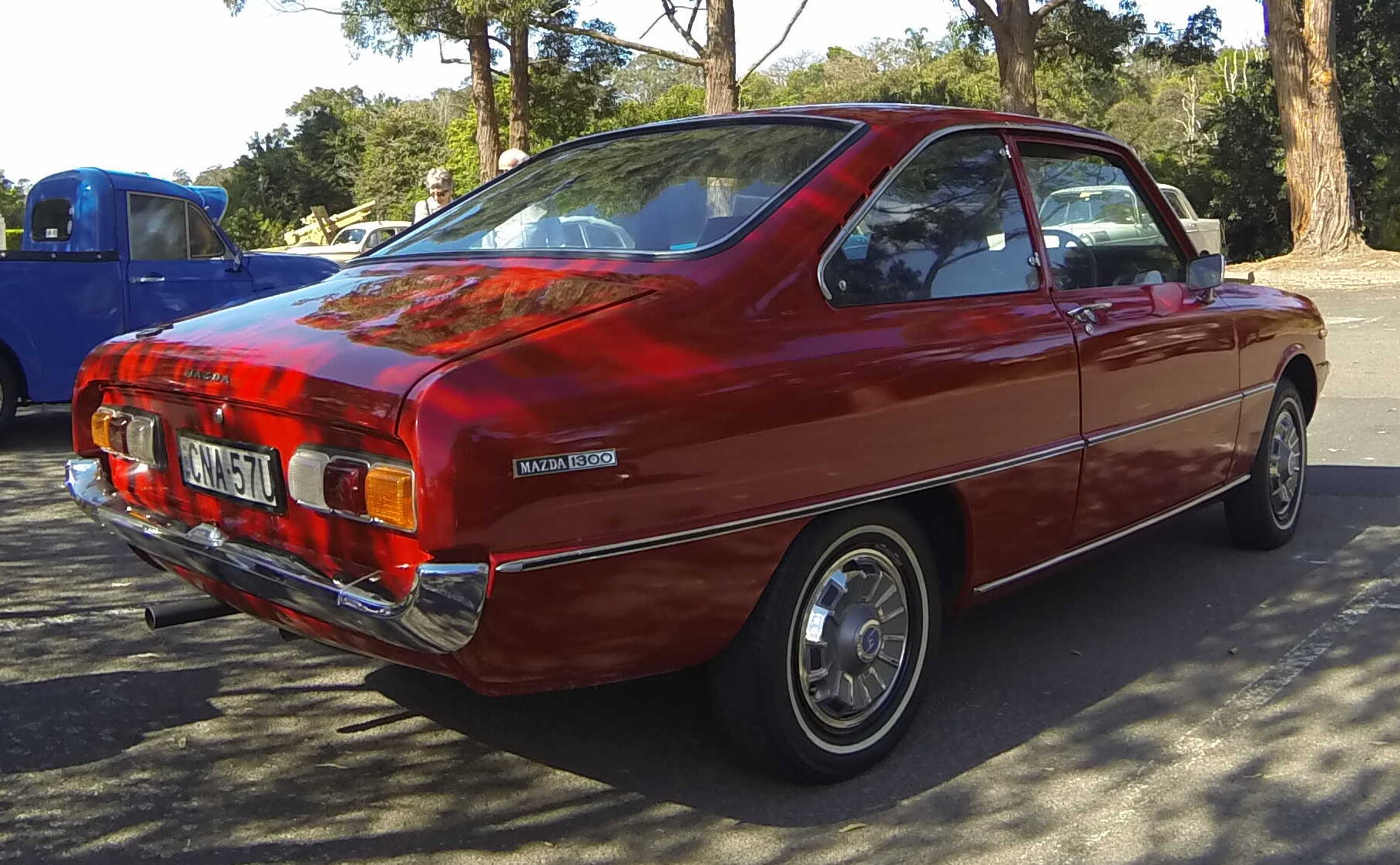
1970–1972 Mazda 1300 coupé (Australia)

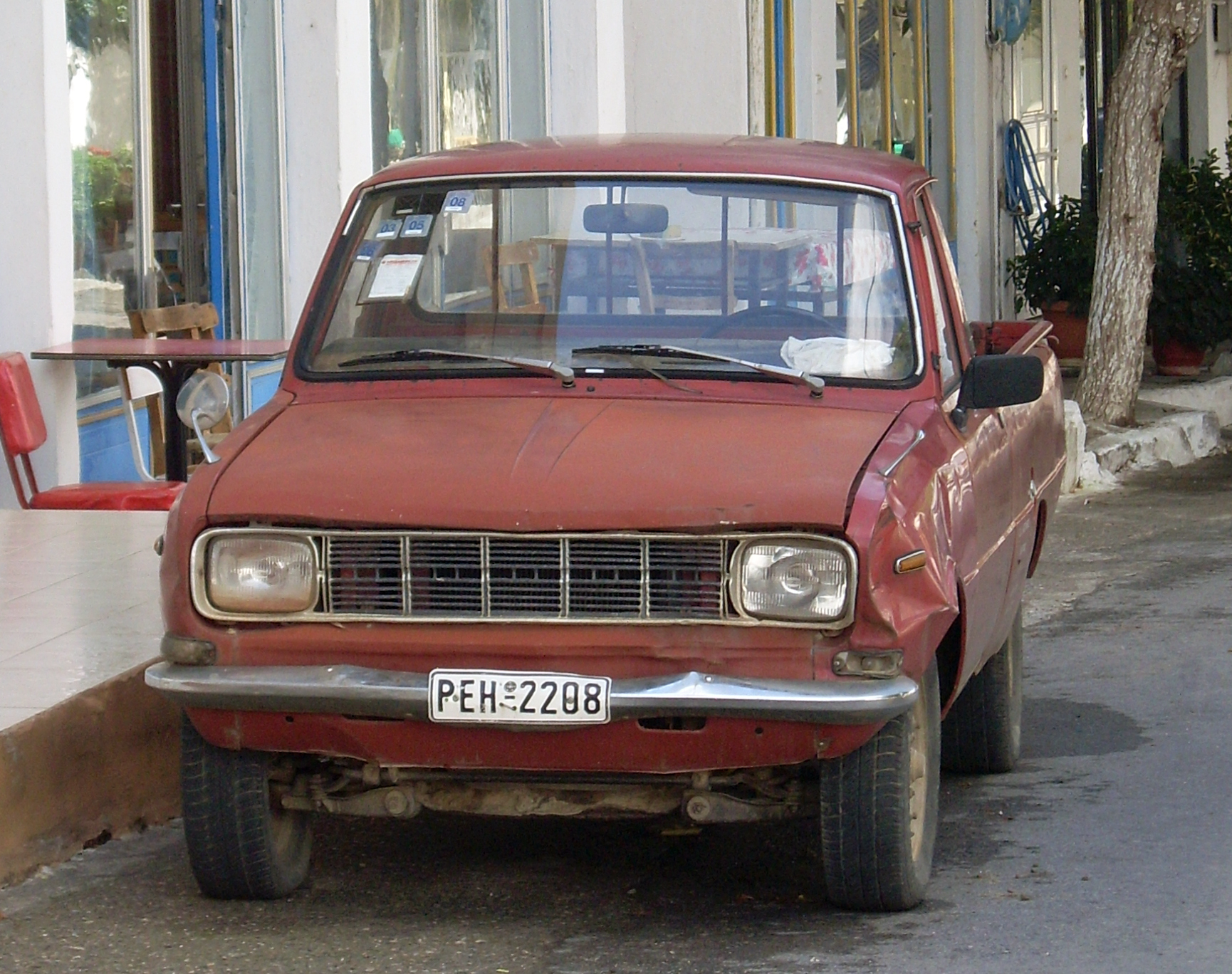
Post-1970 Mazda 1000 pickup (Europe)

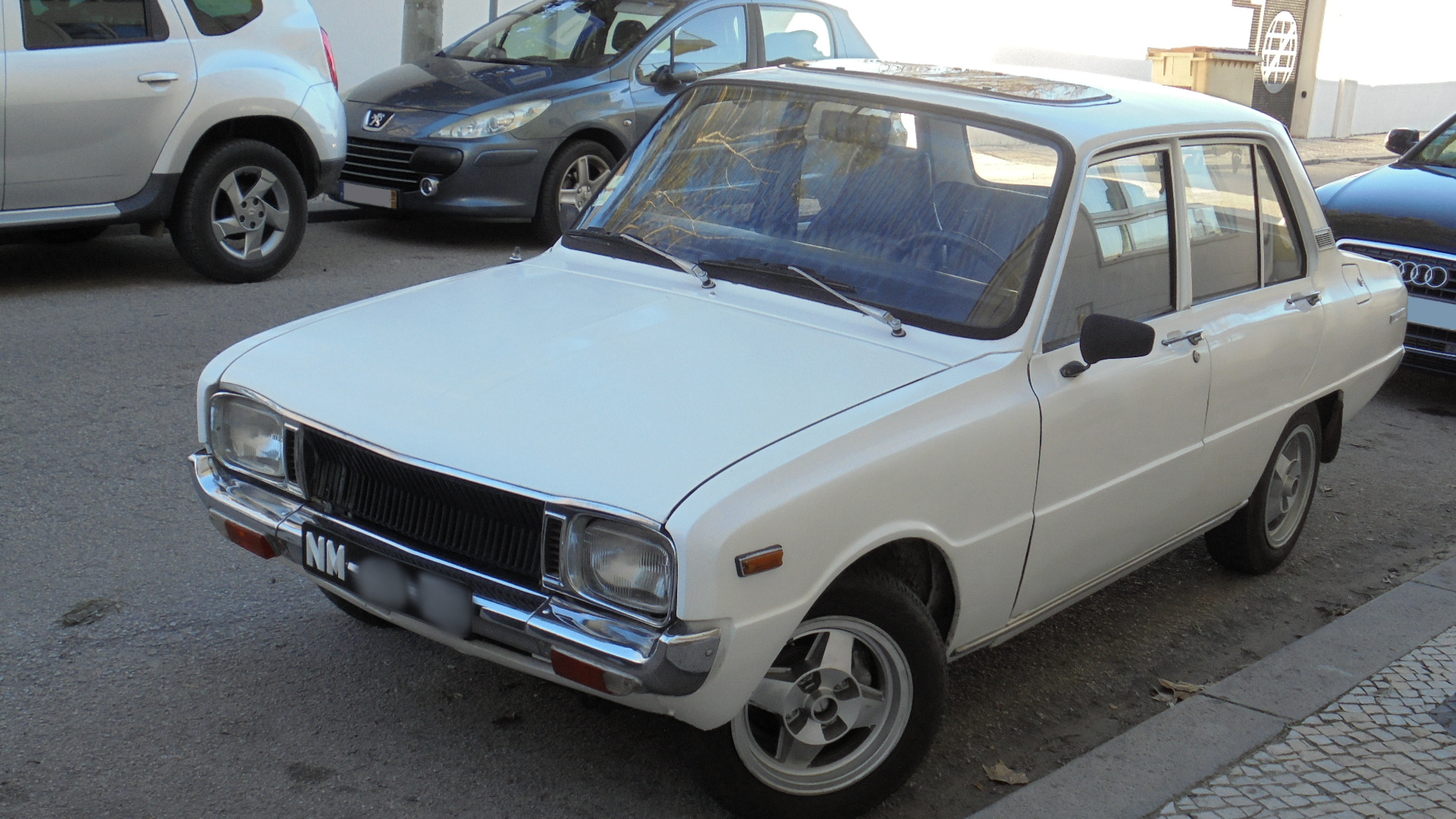
1972–1973 Mazda 1300 4-door saloon (Europe)

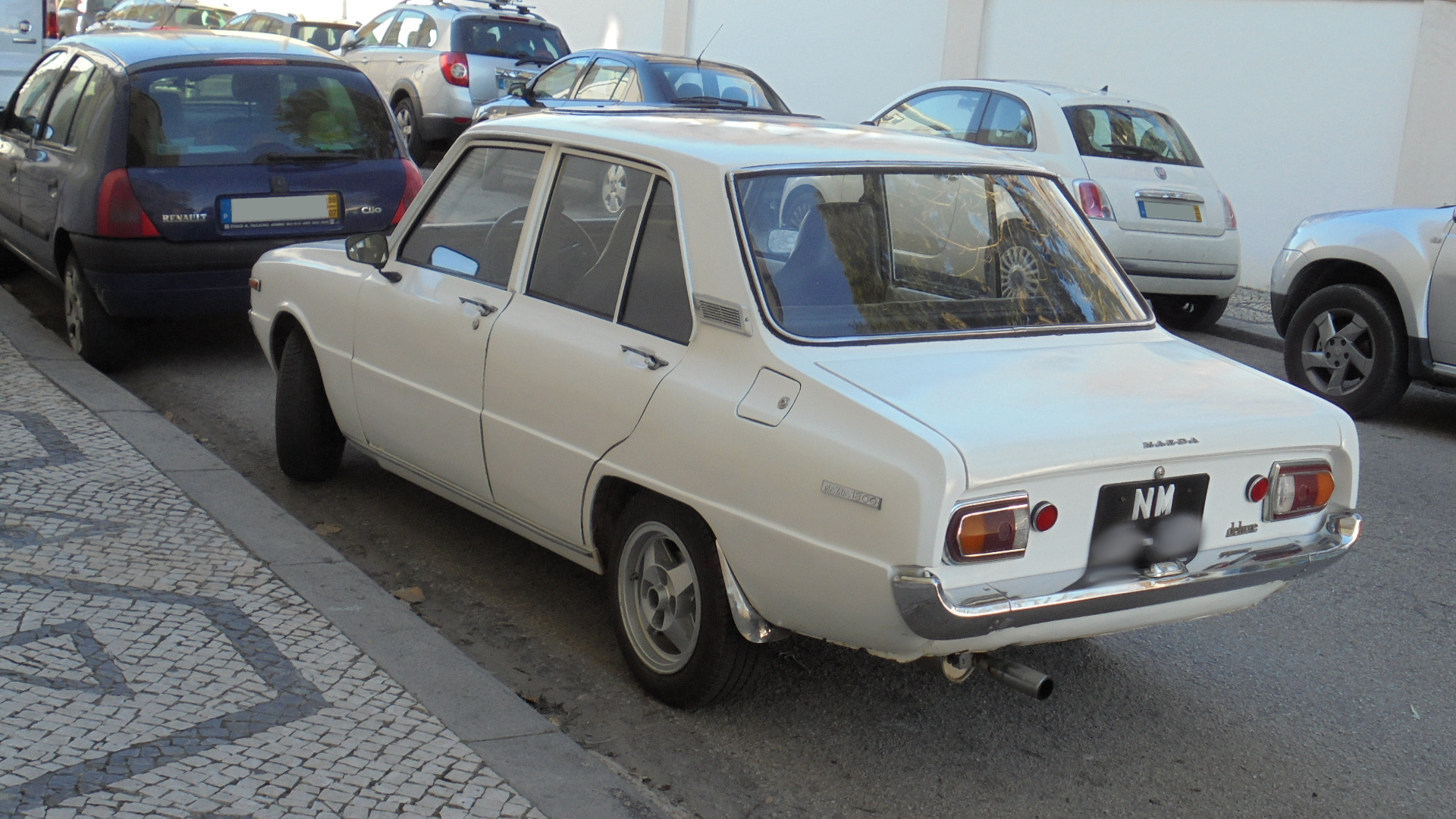
Rear view of late model Mazda 1300 saloon (Europe)

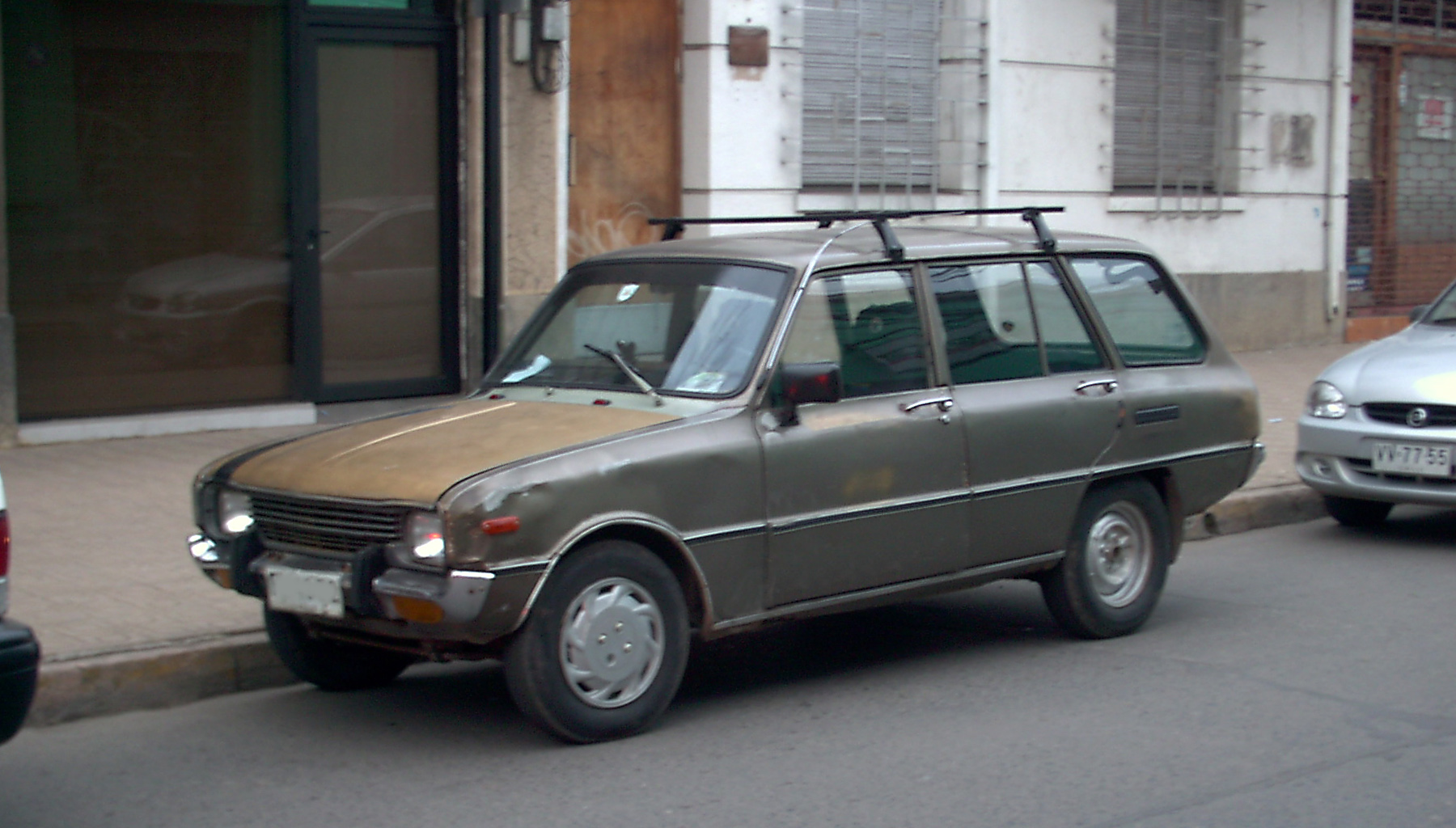
1973–1978 Mazda 1300 5-door wagon

The pickup models were built until 1991 for markets such as South Africa, Zimbabwe, and the Philippines. In South Africa, the little bakkie was sold as the "Mazda F-1000" or "F-1300". In Thailand, a version of the pickup was produced in small numbers until the late 1990s as the Familia Super Cab and Maxi Cab. These were offered with an extended cab, longer beds, and were fitted with the later, 1.4-litre UC engine as seen in the third generation Familia.

Engines (export power outputs, DIN):

- 1968–1973 – 1.0 L (985 cc) PB I4, 50 hp (37 kW; 51 PS) / 56 lb⋅ft (76 N⋅m)
- 1968–1970 – 1.2 L (1169 cc) TB I4, 58 hp (43 kW; 59 PS) / 69 lb⋅ft (94 N⋅m)
- 1970–1973 – 1.3 L (1272 cc) TC I4, 2-barrel, 69 hp (51 kW; 70 PS) / 67 lb⋅ft (91 N⋅m)

The pickup received the BPB55, BTA55/65, or FA2T55/65/66 model codes respectively when fitted with the OHV 1.0 or 1.2, or the OHC 1.3. FA2T55 was a short bed with 500 kg (1,100 lb) max load, 65 was a long bed with the same capacity, while the 66 upped that to 600 kg (1,300 lb). All three models were available as either Standard or Deluxe. The 1000 Van (Japanese terminology for the station wagon, which was intended for commercial use there) received either BPCV or BPBV chassis codes, signifying three- or five-door versions. The Familia Presto Van, with OHC engines, received chassis numbers MP3xV/SP3xV for the 1000 (3-door/5-door) and MT2xV/ST2xV for the 1200. The five-door Van range was gradually expanded downwards as the three-door models dropped in popularity. The Familia Presto Van continued largely unchanged until the summer of 1978, aside from the 1.3 losing two horsepower along the way.

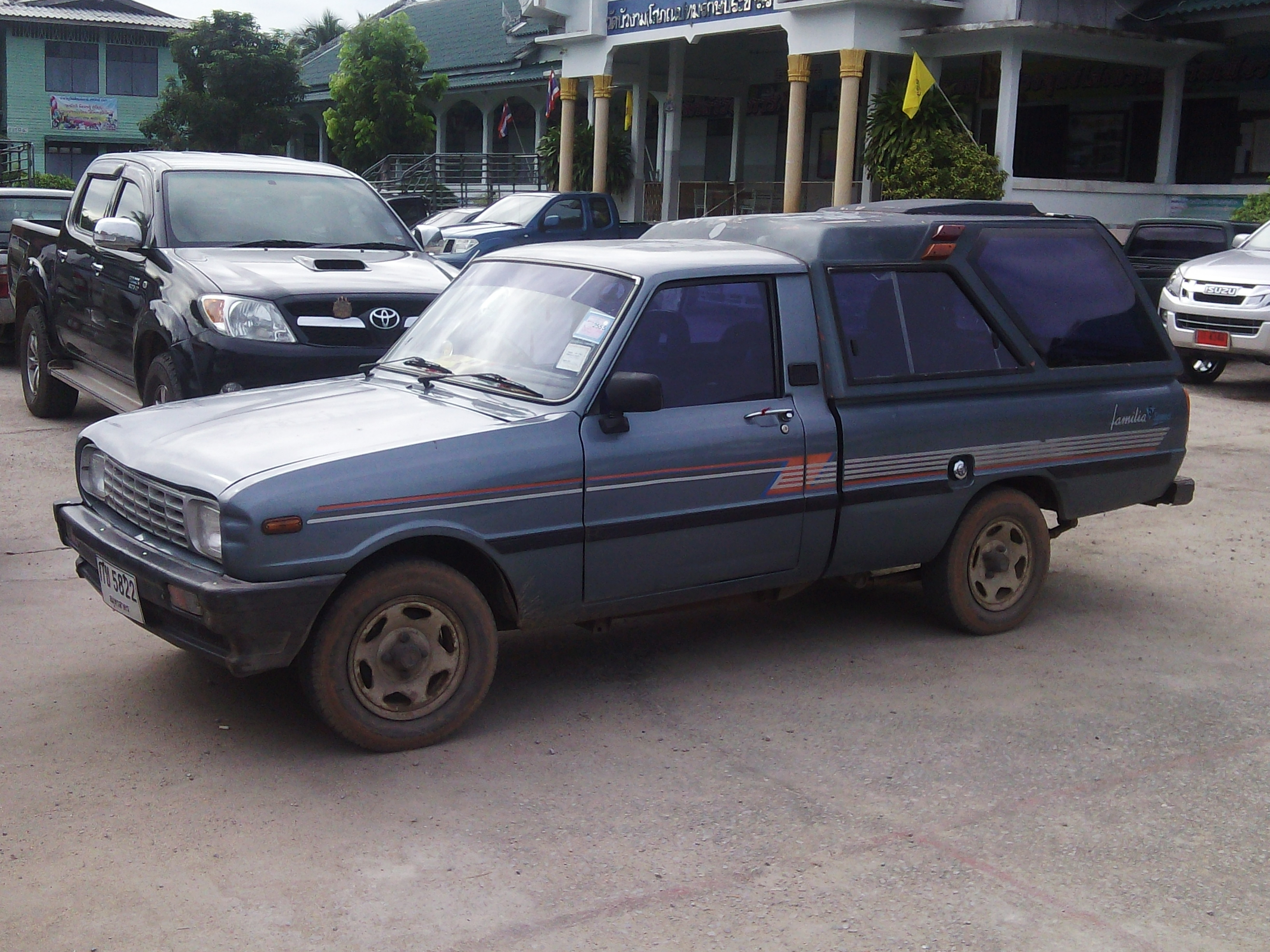
1990 Mazda Familia Standard Cab 1300 pickup (Thailand)

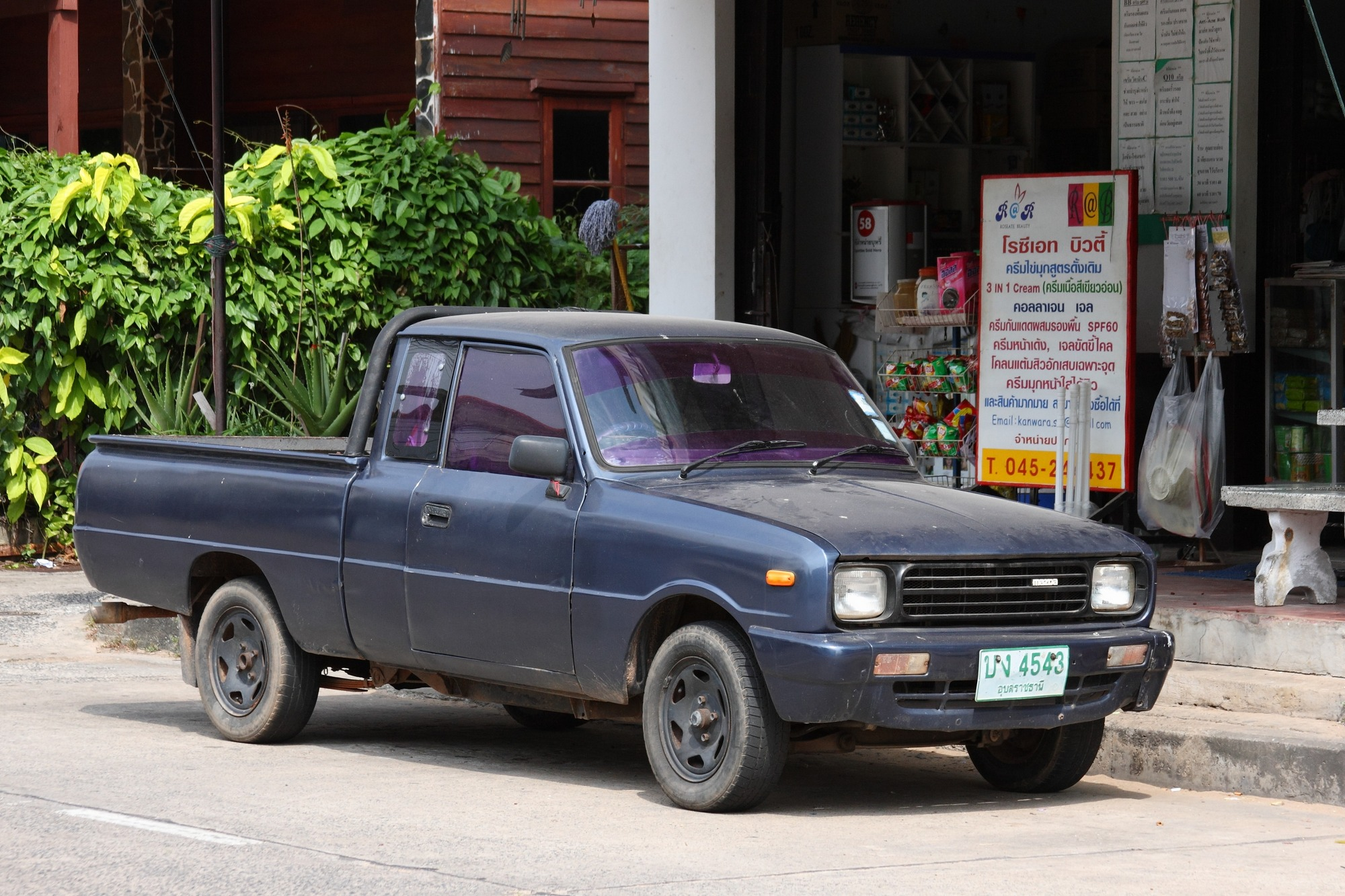
1992 Mazda Familia Super Cab 1400 pickup (Thailand)

=== Familia Rotary/R100 ===
In July 1968 Mazda added a Familia Rotary model to the range, offered in both two-door coupé and four-door saloon variants. Saloon models were given an additional "SS" nameplate. The Familia Rotary was powered by a 982 cc 10A Wankel rotary engine and the coupé version was sold outside Japan as the "Mazda R100". After an April 1970 update (known colloquially in Australia as the Series 2) it was known as the "Familia Presto Rotary" in Japan as the Presto nameplate was added into the entire Familia range. With a small carburetor, power was rated at 100 PS (74 kW), thus the "R100" name. The rotary engined R100 has a unique front end design, with a more prominent pointed bonnet, grille, and bumper. The rear also gained its own design with twin round tail lights, which became for a time a signature design element for the rotary engined versions of Mazda's cars. Inside, the cars were more sumptuously appointed with plusher seats and chrome plated accents, full sized interior door trim panels, a floor mounted handbrake lever, and a unique cockpit styled dashboard with full instrumentation. Mazda referred to this dashboard as the "T-Dash", and fitted it to top spec piston engined variants of the Familia on the Japanese market as well as the rotary models.

In Japan, the installation of a rotary engine gave Japanese buyers a financial advantage when it came time to pay the annual road tax in that they bought a car that was more powerful than a traditional piston engine, but without having the penalty for having an engine in the above 1.0-litre tax bracket. This was the only generation of the Familia that had the rotary engine offered. When Mazda updated the rotary engine to single distributor design in late 1973 with a raft of improvements to improve reliability and fuel economy, the smaller 10A engine was discontinued. Upgrading the Familia Rotary to the 12A engine would have cost the car its tax advantage in Japan, and the decision to discontinue it was made, despite the Familia body continuing production for some years to follow.

The R100 was one of the first Mazda cars imported into the United States for the new Mazda Motors of America, sold in model years 1971 and 1972. Due to US regulations it was released in North America with round headlights fitted in place of the rectangular lights fitted in all other markets. It was a surprising hit with the American public, though sales were limited to some Northwestern states initially: Washington, Oregon, Idaho, Montana, Wyoming and Alaska plus Canada.

Following on the success of the Cosmo Sports at Nürburgring in 1968, Mazda decided to race another rotary car. The Familia Rotary coupé won its first outing, at the Grand Prix of Singapore, in April 1969. Next, the company took on the touring car endurance challenge at Spa, the Spa 24 Hours. For 1969, Mazda entered a pair of Familia Rotary coupés. The cars came fifth and sixth the first year after a quartet of Porsche 911s. The Familia also placed fifth at the Marathon de la Route at Nürburgring in 1969, the same race that the Cosmo had bowed at the previous year. Finally, Mazda took the Familia home for the Suzuka All-Japan Grand Cup, where it won easily. For 1970, the Familia placed eighth at the RAC Tourist Trophy in June, followed by a fourth place at the West German Touring Car race in July. At Spa, four Familias were present, battling with BMW Alpinas, and Alfa Romeos for the podium. This time, three of the Mazdas retired, with the fourth claiming the fifth position. Mazda also turned its attention to Le Mans in 1970 with rotary-powered prototypes. The company finally won that race 21 years later with the 787B.

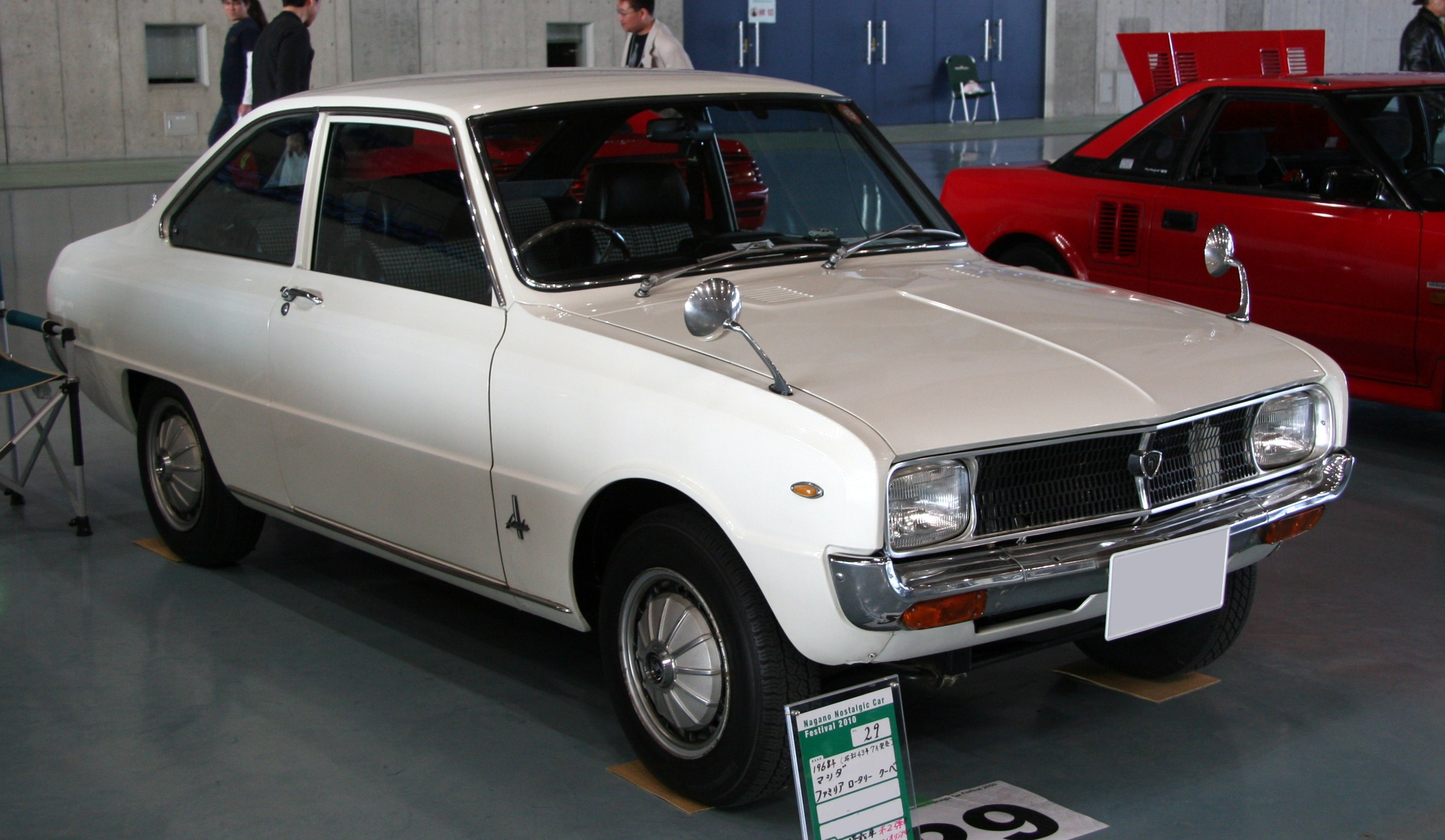
Mazda Familia Rotary (R100) coupé (Japan)

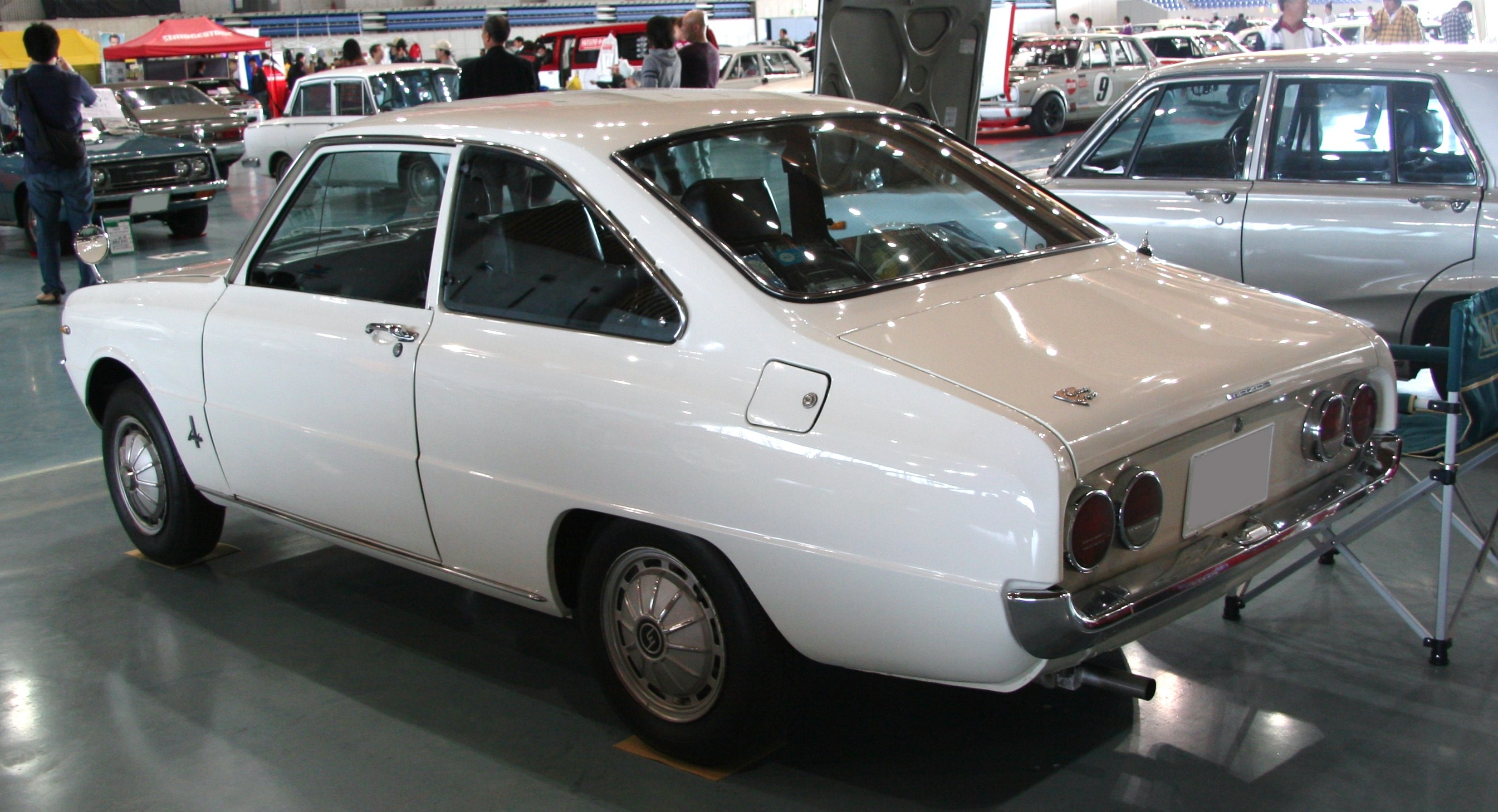
Rear view

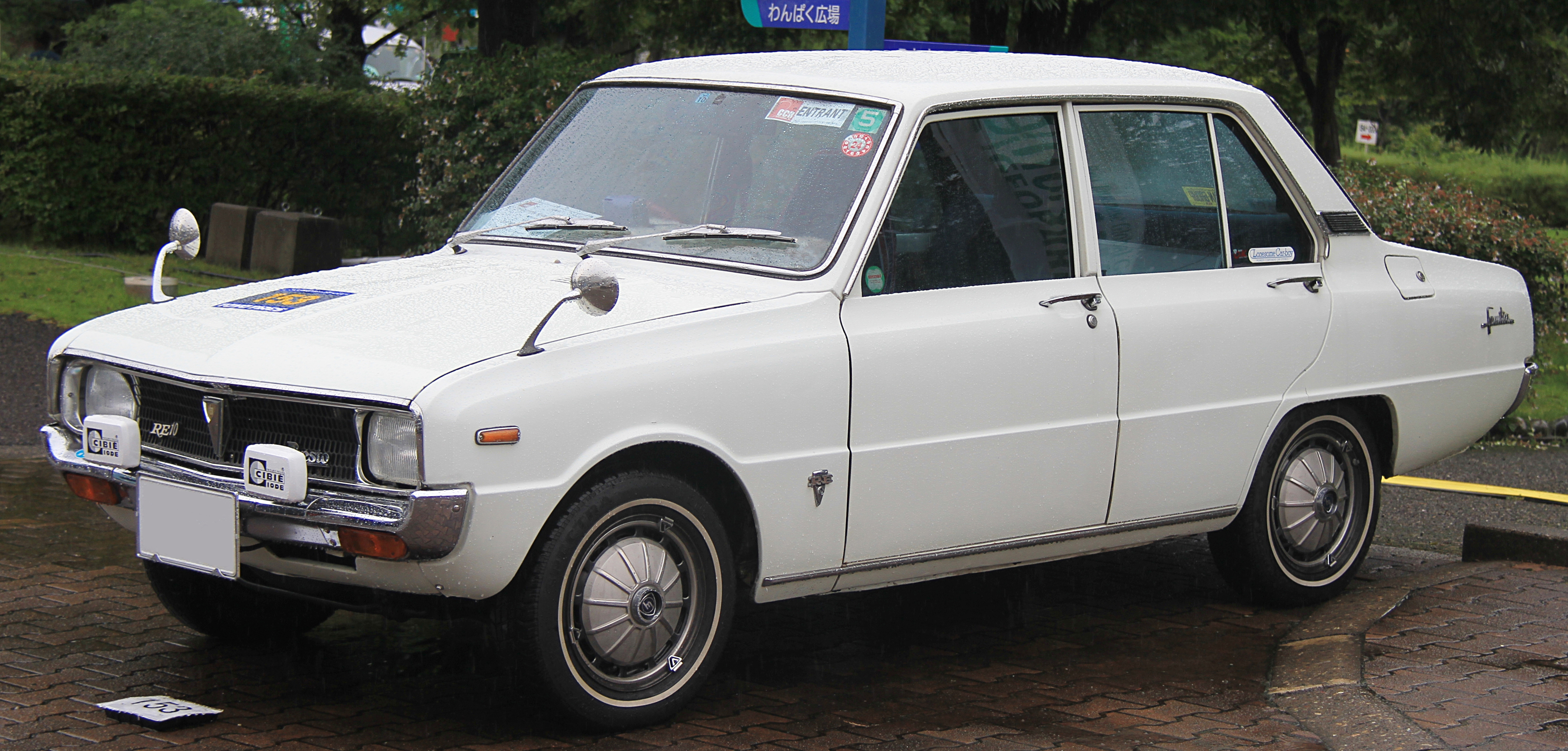
Mazda Familia Presto Rotary 4-door saloon (Japan)

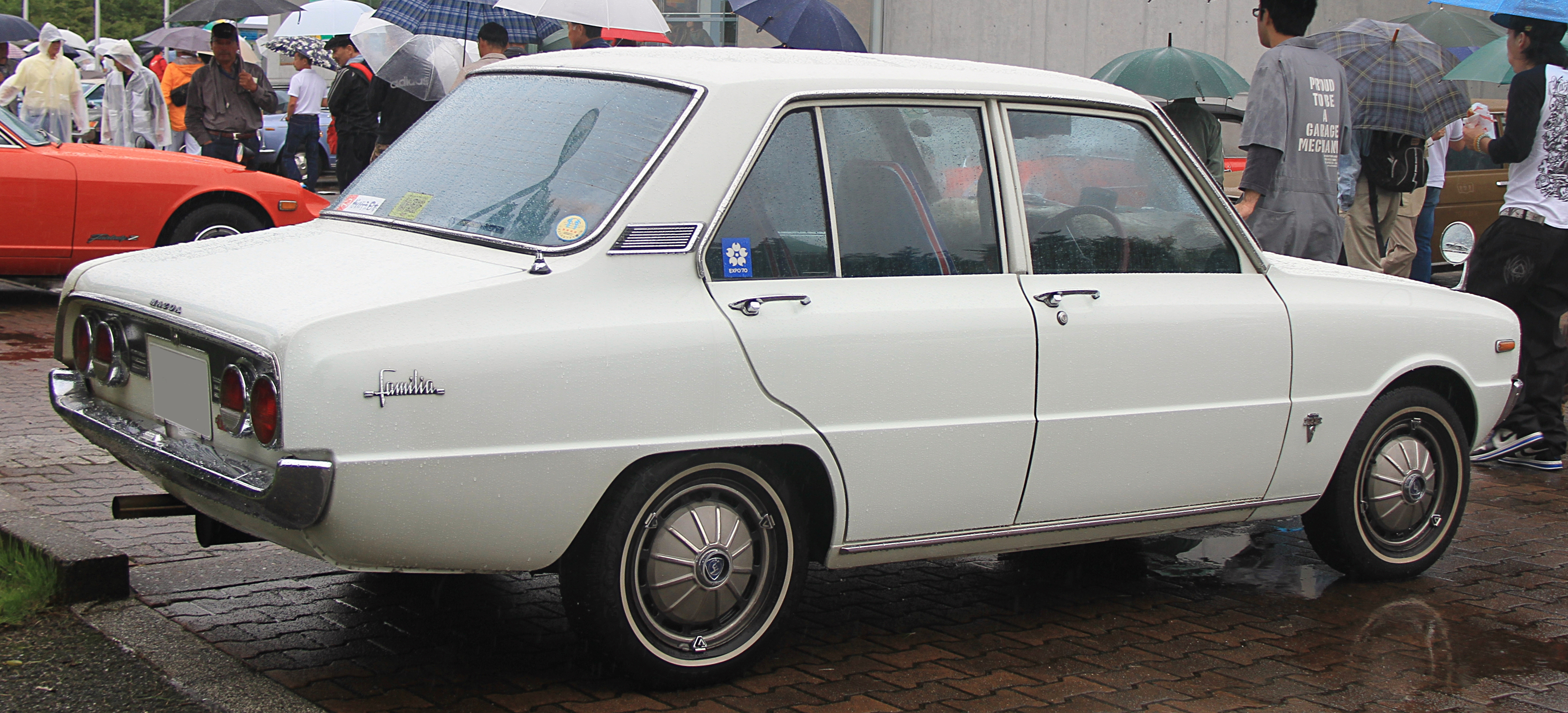
Rear view

=== Kia Brisa ===
The second-generation Familia was manufactured in South Korea by Kia Motors at their first integrated automobile manufacturing facility, the Sohari Plant in Gwangmyeong. Production commenced in 1973 in the form of the Brisa B-1000 pickup; the passenger model (originally as the "Brisa S-1000") was added in October 1974.

The Brisa nameplate comes from the Spanish and Portuguese word for "breeze". It was originally equipped with a 62 PS (46 kW) 1.0-litre Mazda engine, and a bigger 1.3-litre engine was later added to the line up. Production of the Brisa was halted in 1981, as the military dictator Chun Doo-hwan enforced industry consolidation, which required Kia to abandon passenger cars and concentrate solely on light trucks.

The original version of the Brisa received a slightly different front end from the original Familia, featuring twin headlights. Later, single headlights were used. In total, 31,017 Brisa passenger cars were built. Including the pickups increases the totals to 75,987, of which a total of 1,526 were exported. Exports, Kia's first, began with a shipment of 31 Brisa B-1000 pickups to Qatar in 1975. The Brisa (along with the pickup model, typically called "Master" in export) was also exported to Colombia and Greece.

The model appeared prominently in the 2017 South Korean film A Taxi Driver, which told the true story of a German reporter and a South Korean taxi driver who became caught up in Chun's harsh response to the Gwangju Uprising in 1980.

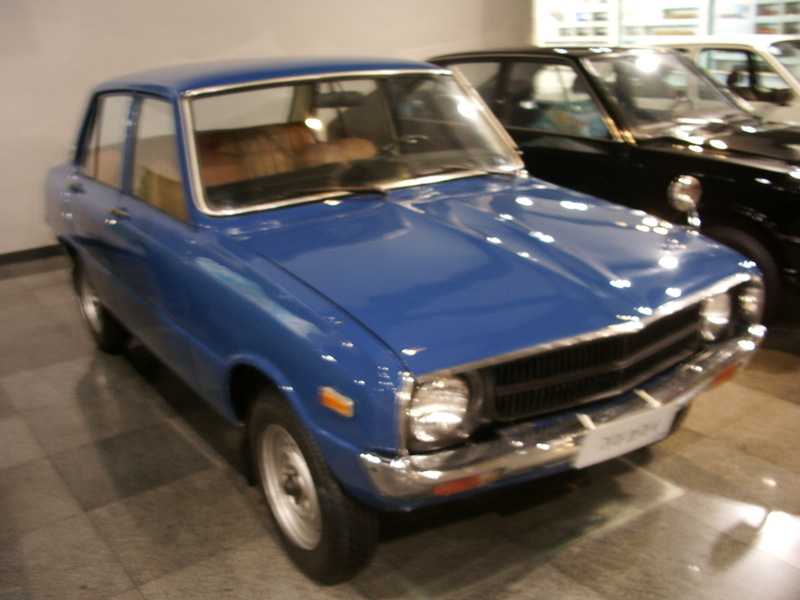
Kia Brisa S-1000 (pre-facelift)

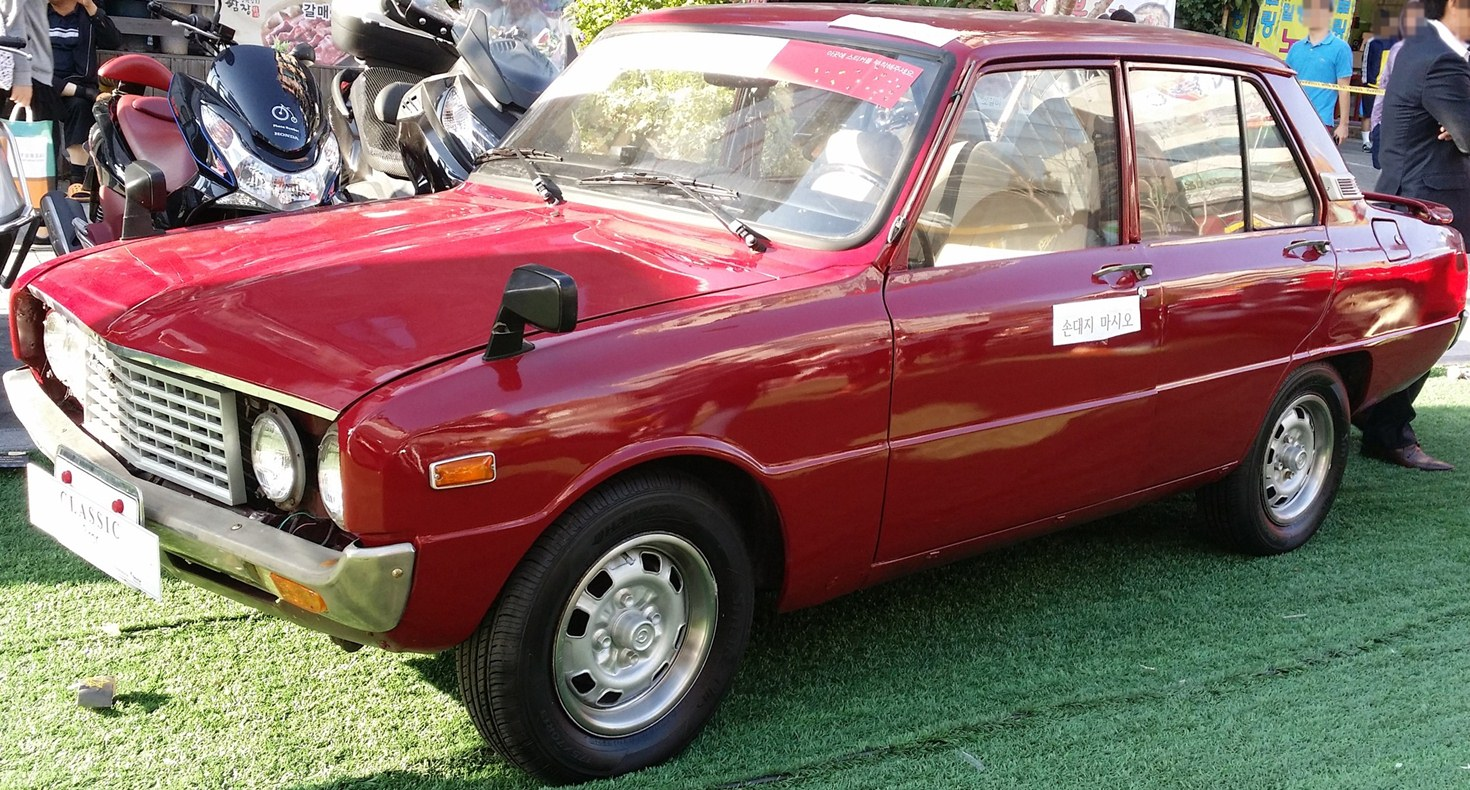
Kia Brisa S-1000 (facelift)

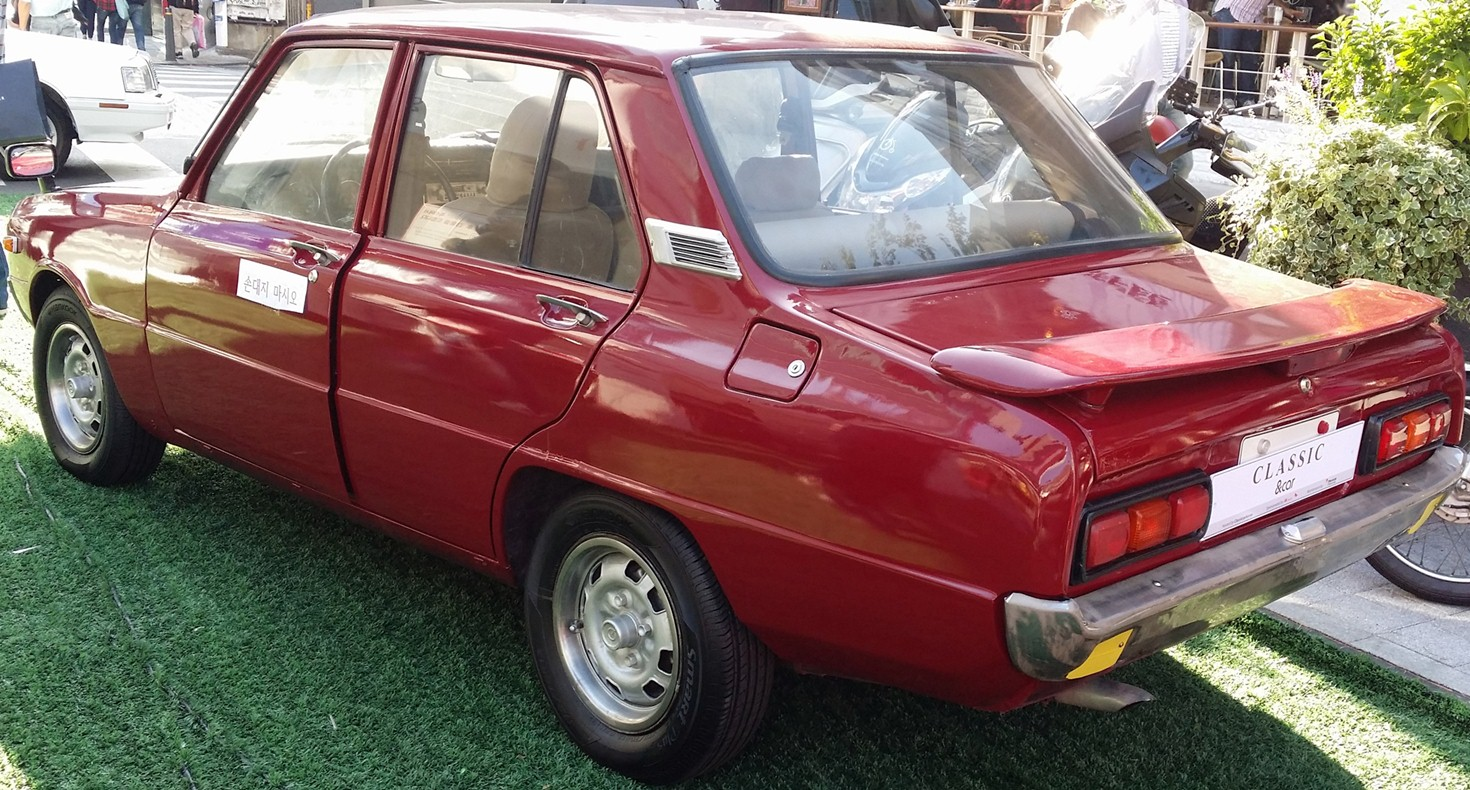
rear view (facelift)

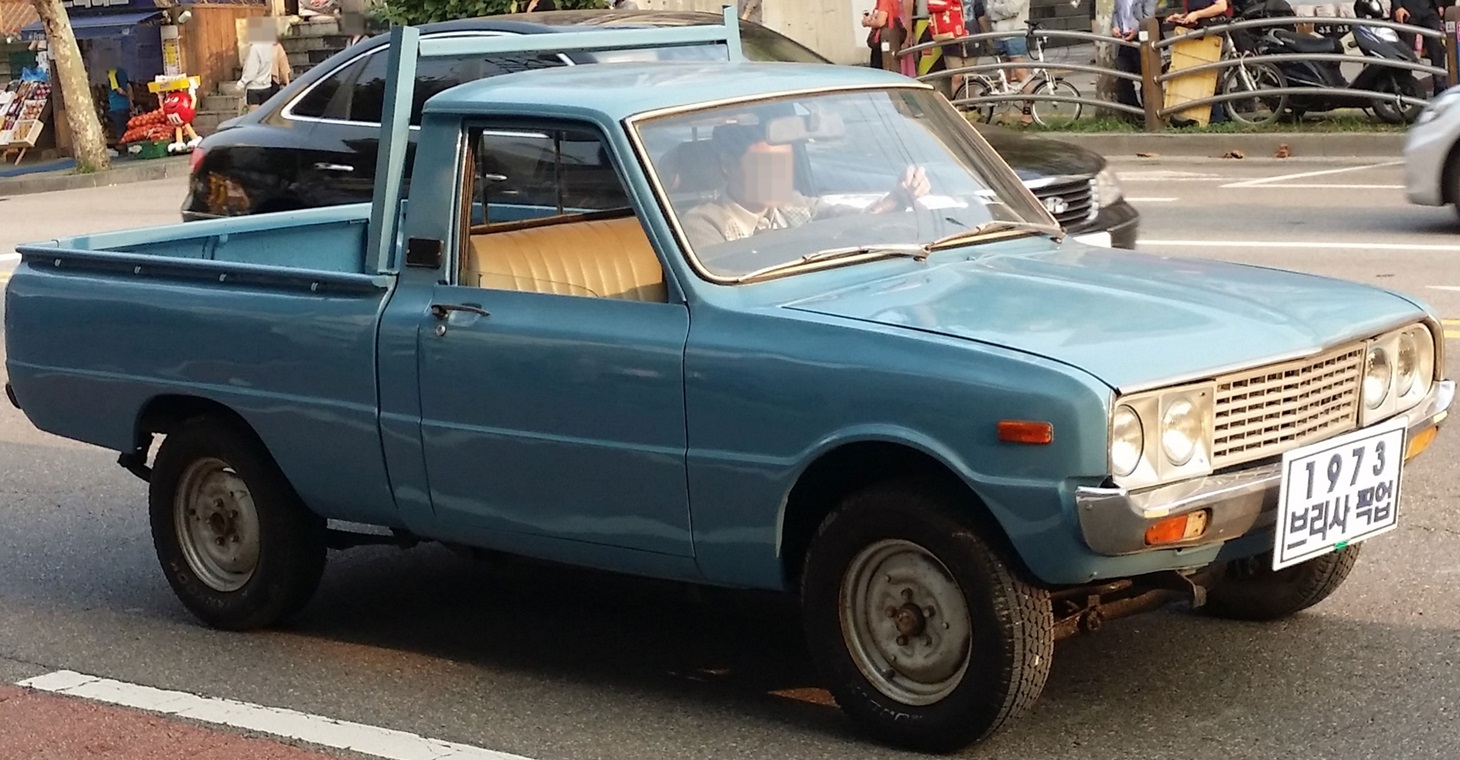
Kia Master pickup

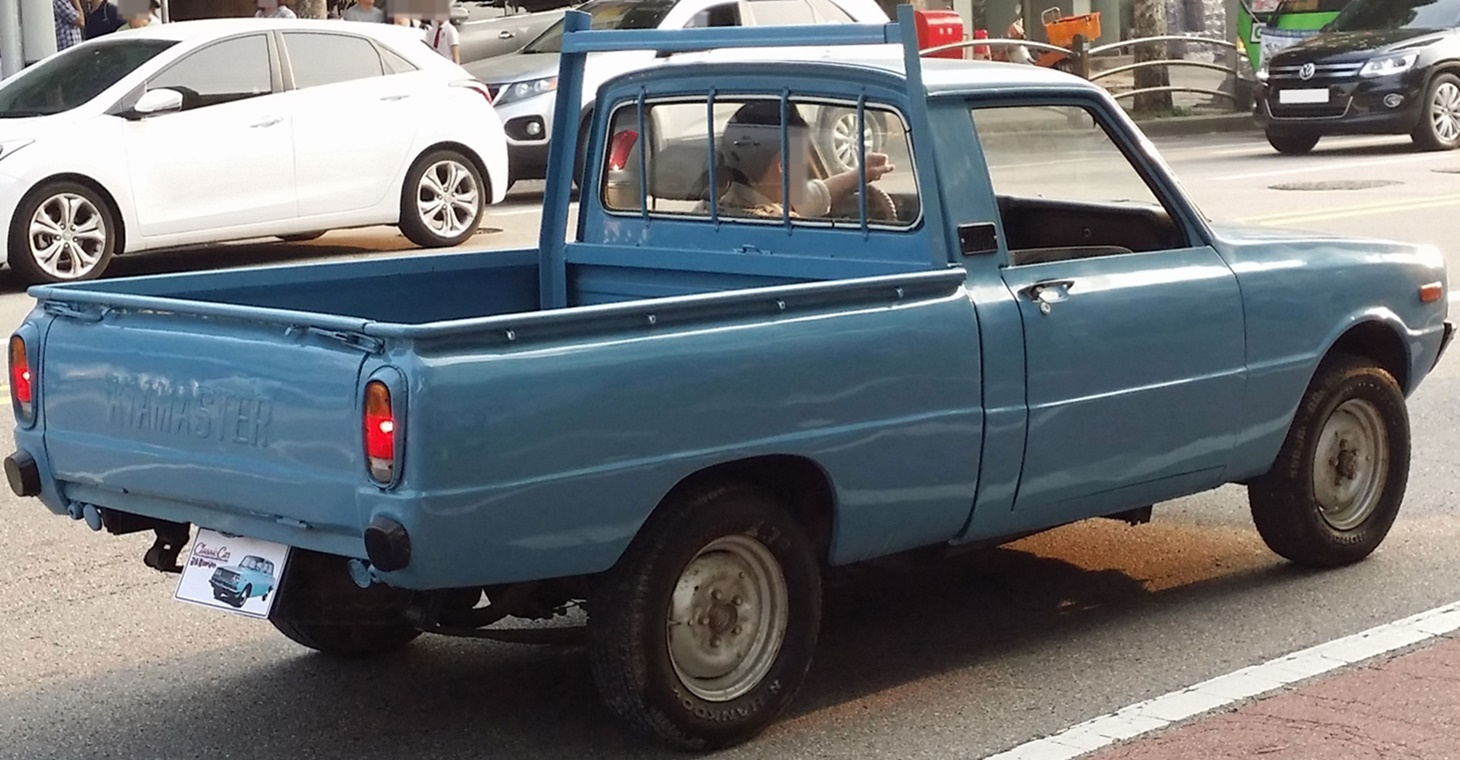
rear view

=== Mazda Grand Familia/Savanna/808/818/RX-3 ===
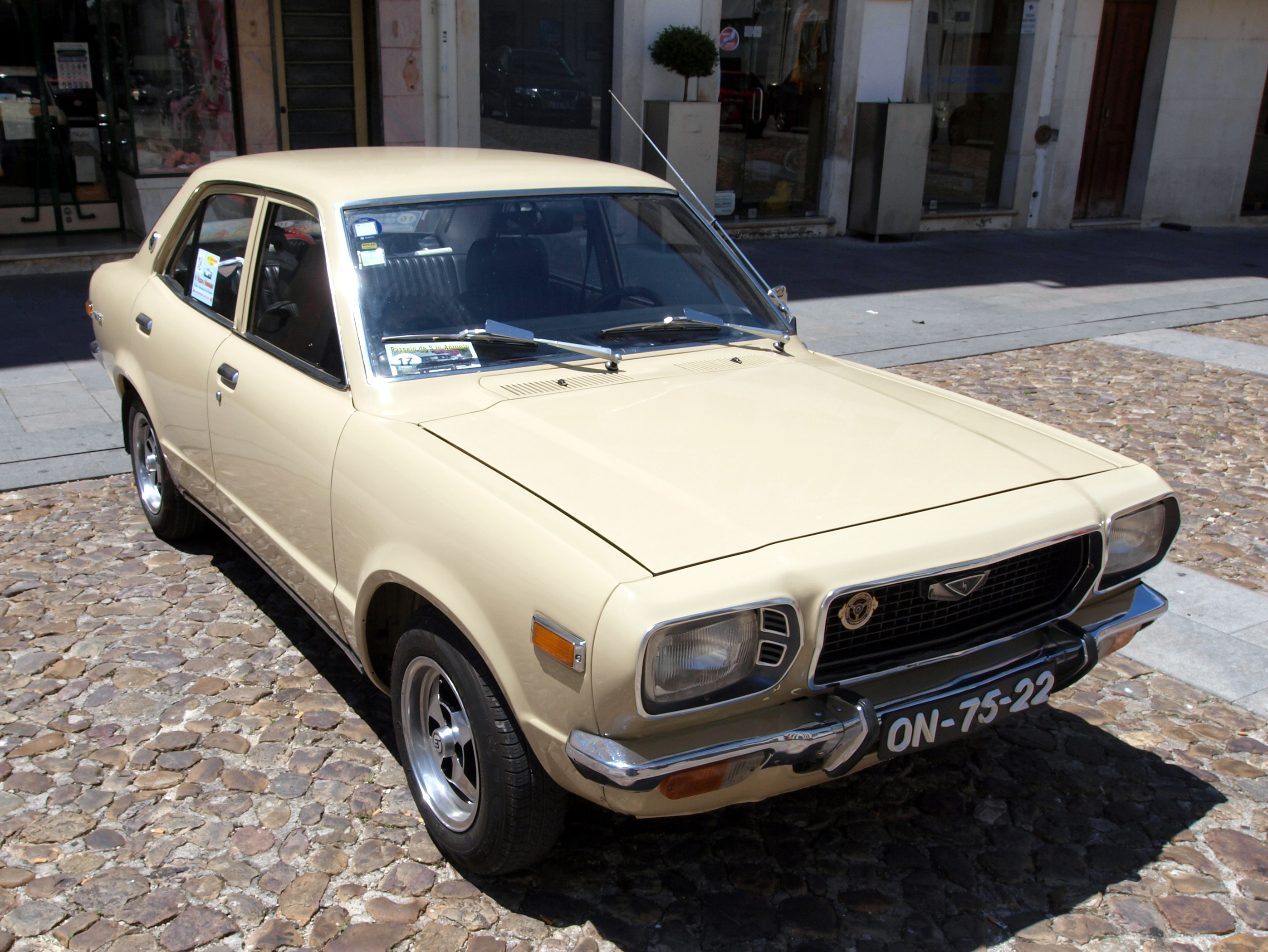
Mazda 818 saloon

In September 1971, Mazda introduced the "Mazda Grand Familia" and the Mazda Savanna to better compete with the Toyota Corolla, and the Nissan Sunny in North America. The Grand Familia/Savanna was intended to replace the smaller Familia. But with the advent of the 1970s energy crisis, the Familia began to experience an increase in sales due to better fuel economy, so the Familia remained in Japan and Europe, and Mazda decided to offer the Grand Familia and Savanna as larger, performance enhanced alternatives. It is better known by its export market names Mazda 808, 818, and RX-3. The Grand Familia was also built by Kia with the 1272 cc engine from October 1975, originally as the Brisa II and later as the K303.

== Third generation (FA3 series 2; 1973) ==
Third generation (FA3 series 2)
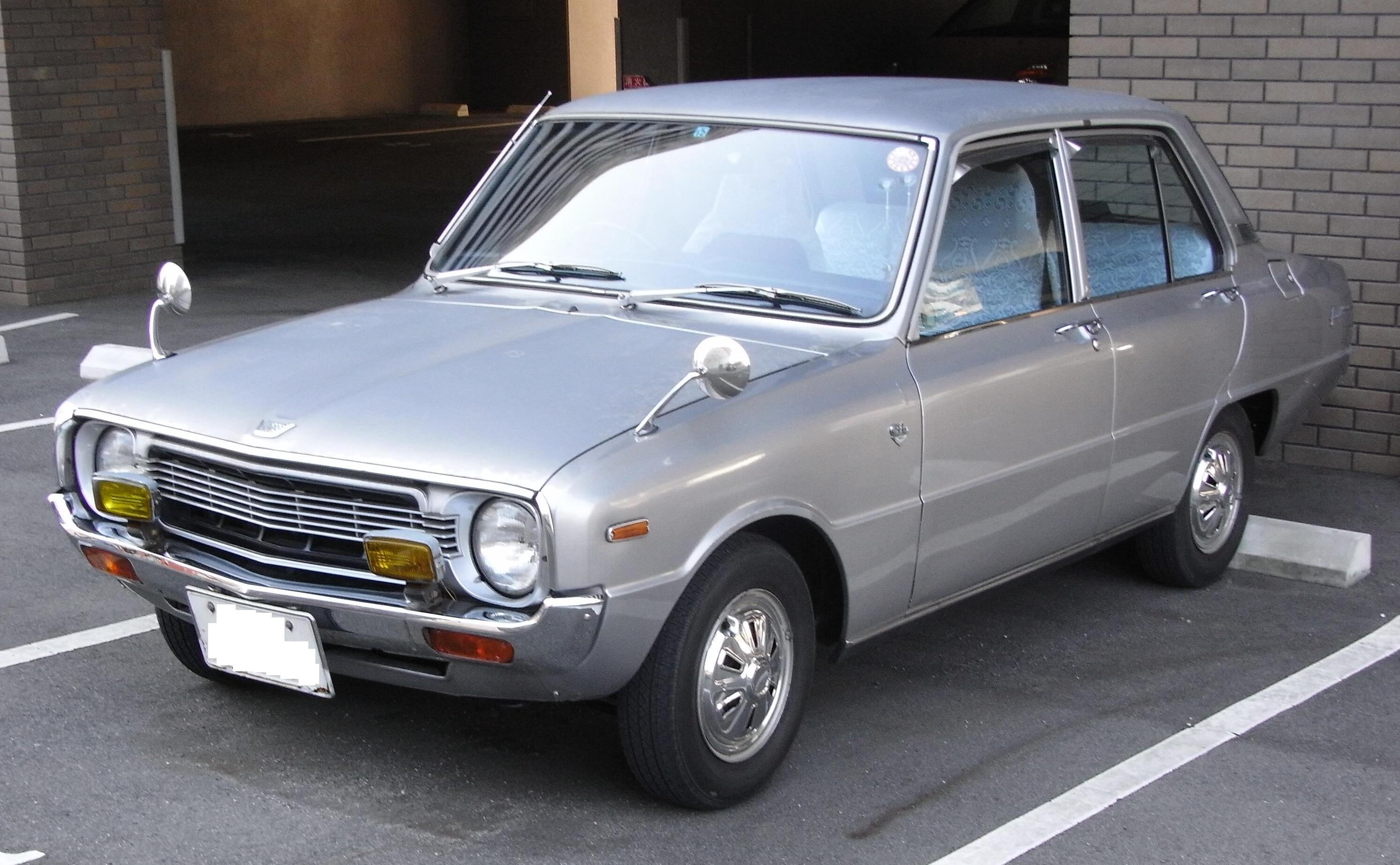
- 1973–1976 Mazda Familia Presto 4-door saloon (Japan)

Overview
- Also called: Mazda 1000/1300; Mazda Marella (Finland)
- Production: 1973–1977
- Assembly: Japan: Hiroshima Assembly, Hiroshima

Body and chassis
- Body style: 2/4-door saloon; 2-door coupé (Japan)
- Layout: Front-engine, rear-wheel-drive

Powertrain
- Engine: 985 cc PC I4; 1272 cc TC I4
- Transmission: 4-speed manual transmission; 3-speed automatic transmission (JDM 1.3 L saloon only)

Dimensions
- Wheelbase: 2,260 mm (89 in)
- Length: 3,855 mm (152 in)
- Width: 1,540 mm (61 in)
- Height: 1,350 mm (53 in) (coupé); 1,385 mm (55 in) (saloon)
- Curb weight: 755–845 kg (1,664–1,863 lb)

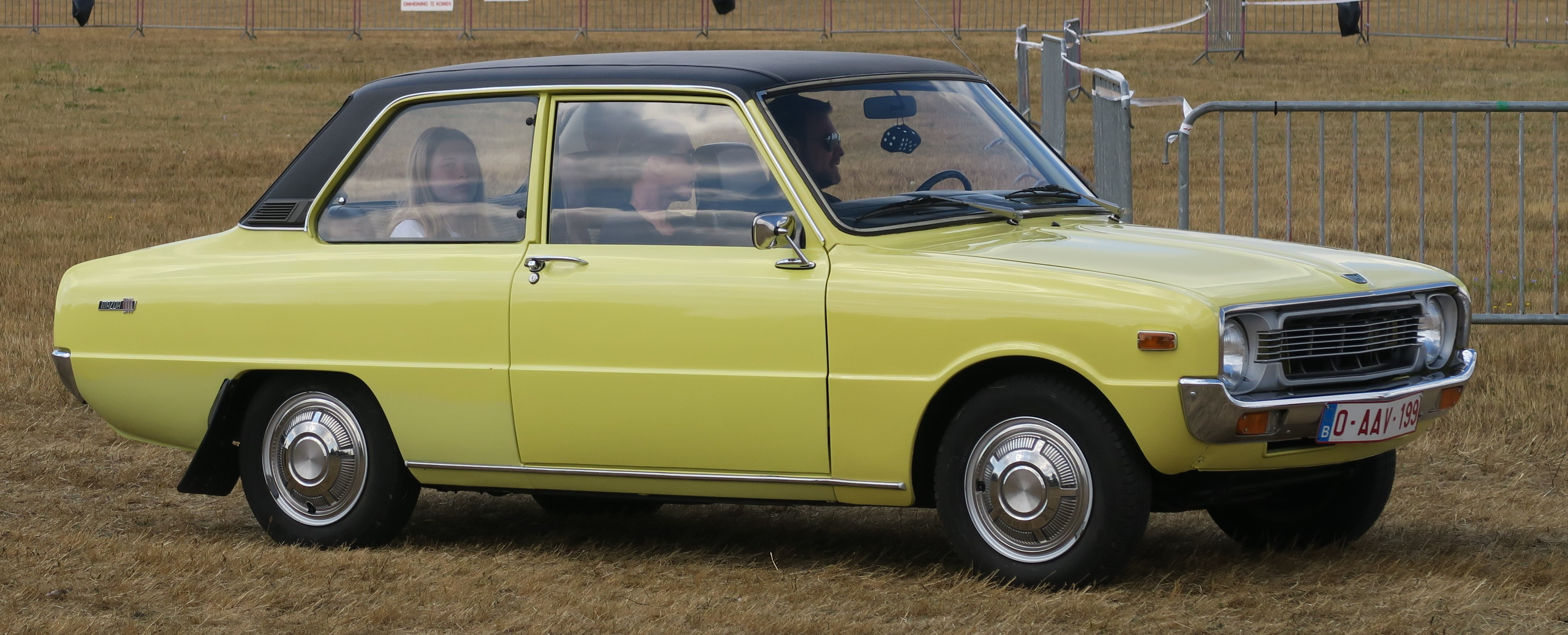
Mazda 1000 2-door saloon (Europe)

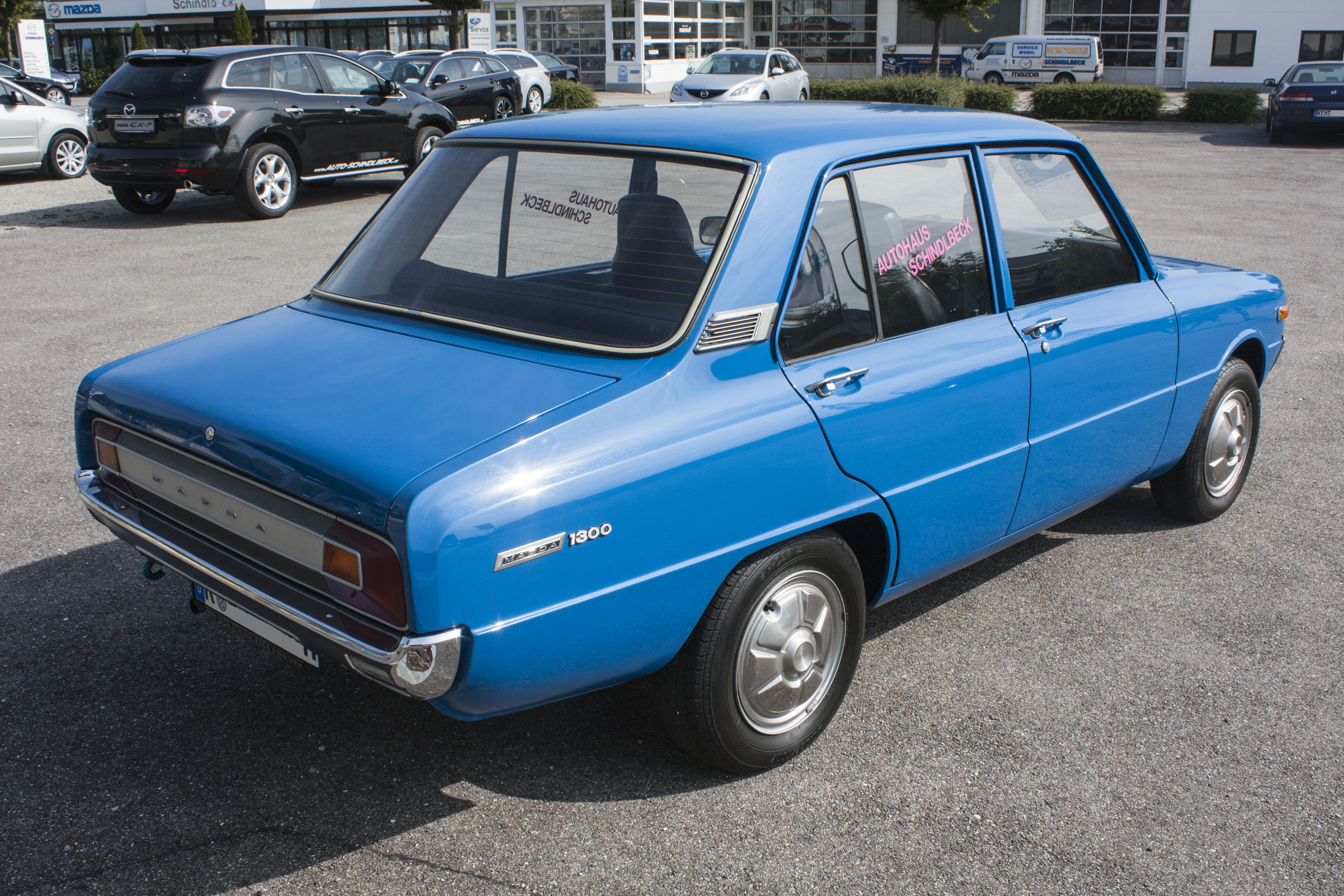
Mazda 1300 4-door saloon

The third generation of the Familia Presto was announced in September 1973, a month before the 1973 oil crisis. It was basically an updated version of the 1970 Familia Presto, reintroduced with 60 mm wider bodywork and reworked front and rear designs. It was promoted and marketed as the "Widebody" in Japan. These changes were made only to the saloons and coupé, while the van/wagon and pickups remained in production and retaining the original narrower bodywork with minor changes. The Familia Presto continued using the "Mazda 1000/1300" name in most export markets, "Mazda Marella" name was also retained in Finland.

The Rotary Presto saloon/coupé was discontinued in Japan, having been replaced by the larger Grand Familia-based Mazda Savannah. The piston-engined 1000/1300 and rotary-engined R100 coupés were also replaced by 808/818/RX-3 coupé for export market. This generation was not available in North America and replaced by the bigger 808/Mizer/RX-3. Developed to meet new stricter emissions standards in the domestic market, the Presto featured the 1272 cc TC engine or the by now familiar, pushrod 1.0-litre PB unit. Power outputs in Japan (JIS gross) are 62 PS (46 kW; 61 hp) and 87 PS (64 kW; 86 hp) respectively, 50 PS (37 kW; 49 hp) and 66 PS (49 kW; 65 hp) (DIN) for export markets.

Production of the third generation Familia ended in January 1977, but not before another minor facelift and emissions scrubbing had taken place in February 1976. This changes were not applied for export market. After this change, only the larger engine with lean-burn technology was available in the home market, now with 72 PS (53 kW; 71 hp) (JIS gross) and labelled Familia Presto 1300AP (for "Anti Pollution").

== Fourth generation (FA4; 1977) ==
Fourth generation
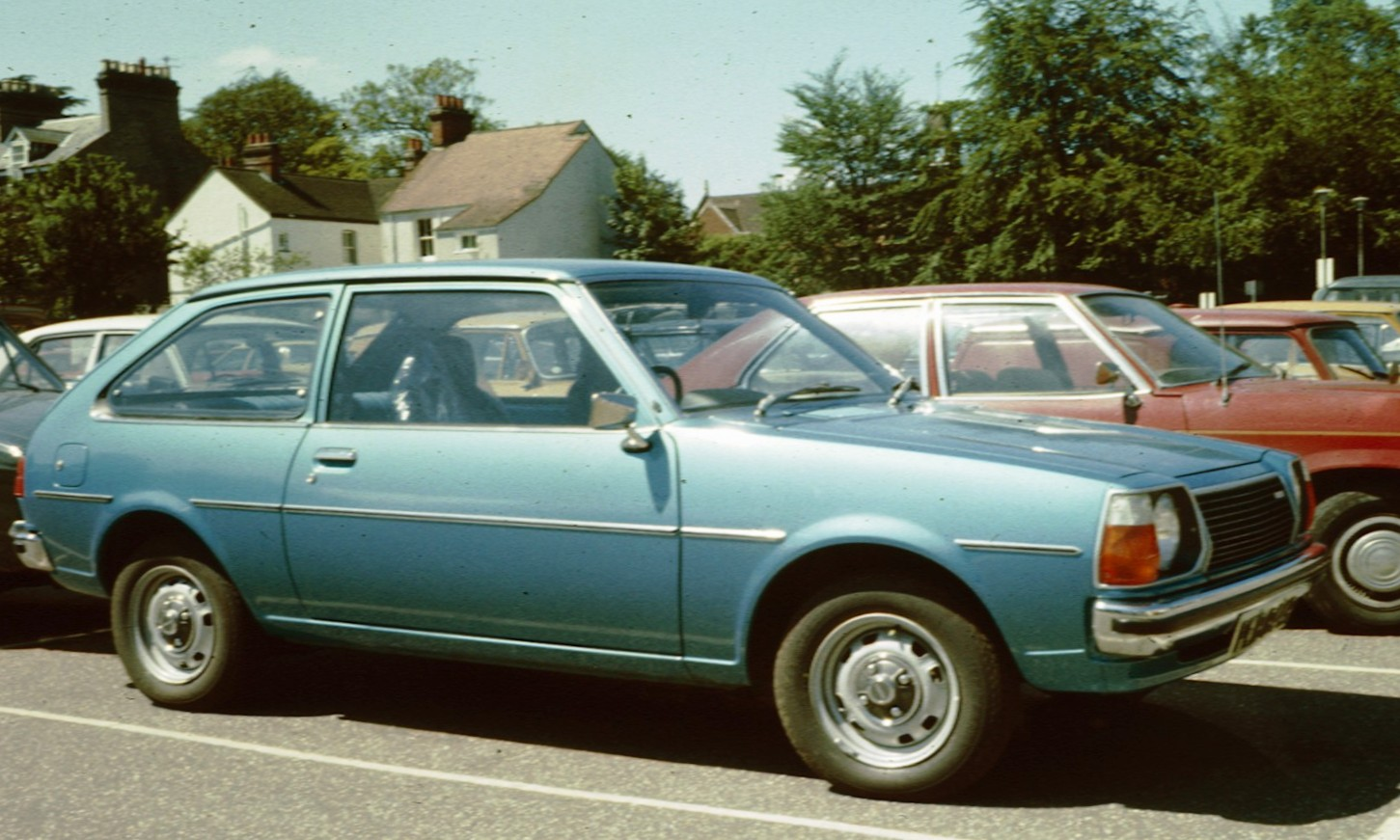
- 1977–1979 Mazda 323 3-door hatchback (Europe)

Overview
- Also called: Mazda 323 (export); Mazda GLC (North America); Mazda MR90/Baby Boomers (5-door hatchback; Indonesia); Mazda M-1400 Vantrend (wagon/van/pickup; Indonesia)
- Production: January 1977–1980 (hatchback); June 1978–1986 (wagon); 1978–1980, 1990–1997 (Indonesia)
- Assembly: Japan: Hiroshima; New Zealand: Ōtāhuhu; Indonesia: Bekasi (Mazda Indonesia Manufacturing); South Africa: Silverton, Pretoria (Sigma Motor Corporation)

Body and chassis
- Body style: 3/5-door hatchback; 3/5-door wagon/van; 3-door panel van; 2-door pickup (Indonesia)
- Layout: Front-engine, rear-wheel-drive

Powertrain
- Engine: 985 cc PC I4 (FA4PS); 1272 cc TC I4 (FA4TS); 1415 cc UC I4 (FA4US); 1490 cc E5 I4 (wagon only); 1597 cc 4G32 I4 (South Africa)
- Transmission: 3-speed automatic transmission; 4- or 5-speed manual transmission

Dimensions
- Wheelbase: 2,315 mm (91.1 in)
- Length: Hatchback: *3,835 mm (151.0 in); *3,920–3,975 mm (154.3–156.5 in) (North America); *3,970 mm (156.3 in) (MR90); Pickup: 3,985 mm (156.9 in); Wagon/van: *4,010–4,110 mm (157.9–161.8 in); *4,145–4,205 mm (163.2–165.6 in) (North America); *4,125–4,145 mm (162.4–163.2 in) (Vantrend)
- Width: 1,595–1,605 mm (62.8–63.2 in)
- Height: Hatchback: 1,375 mm (54.1 in); Wagon/van: 1,425–1,775 mm (56.1–69.9 in); Pickup: 1,450 mm (57.1 in)
- Curb weight: Hatchback: 810–920 kg (1,786–2,028 lb); Wagon/van: 845–980 kg (1,863–2,161 lb); Pickup: 835 kg (1,841 lb)

The Familia AP (323 in most of the world, GLC for "Great Little Car" in North America) debuted in January 1977 as a rear-wheel-drive subcompact, replacing both the Grand Familia (818) and the preceding Familia (1000/1300). There was a choice of hatchbacks and station wagon bodies, both available with a three- or five-door bodystyle. The station wagon version was a bit later, first being introduced in June 1978, which also meant that the commercial versions based on the 1970 Familia could finally be retired. Three Mazda engines were available, the 985 cc PC, 1,272 cc TC, and the 1415 cc UC (introduced in March 1978). The 1.0-litre unit was only made for export markets. The new Familia shared many parts with the older Mazda Grand Familia. This was the first appearance of the 323 name, for export markets only.

The Familia AP was marketed to a new kind of consumer, the Japanese youth, and sold well at home as well as abroad. Nonetheless, the cars traditional rear-wheel-drive underpinnings limited interior space and betrayed themselves in having a very narrow track when compared to the body. The FA4 was somewhat of an interim solution while Mazda worked on a front-wheel-drive car, but still managed to sell around 890,000 examples in its three full years of production.

In June 1979, the 323/Familia underwent a facelift, replacing the previous round headlights with rectangular units which were designed as a single unit along with the grille. The new style was in line with that of the recently released Mazda Capella/626 (CB). Other minor differences occurred along with the facelift.

The range was replaced in 1980, however, the station wagon models continued in production until 1986.

The FA4-series Familia/323 was available in several body variants:

- Five-door four-seat hatchback
- Three-door four-seat hatchback
- Five-door four-seat station wagon (also as a van in Japan)
- Three-door four-seat station wagon
- Three-door two-seat van with an extended roof profile
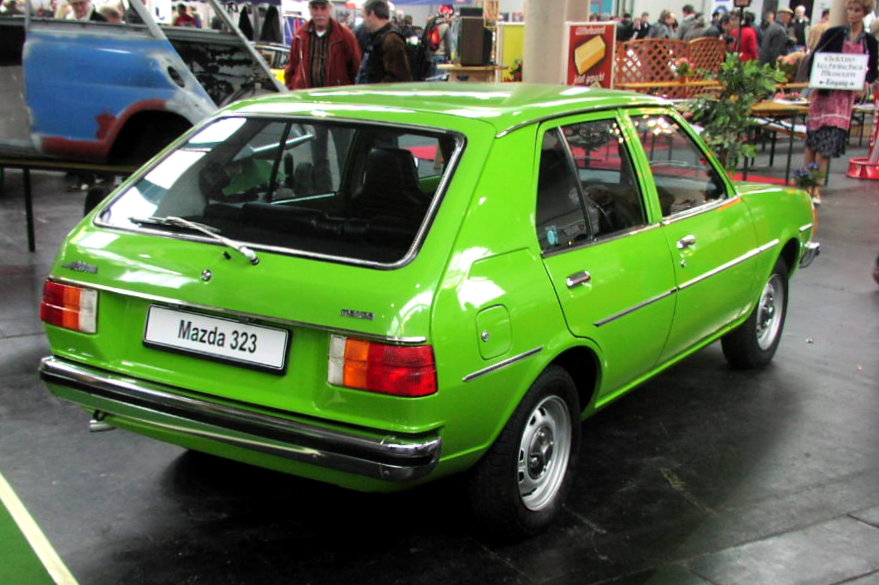
1977–1979 Mazda 323 5-door hatchback (Europe)

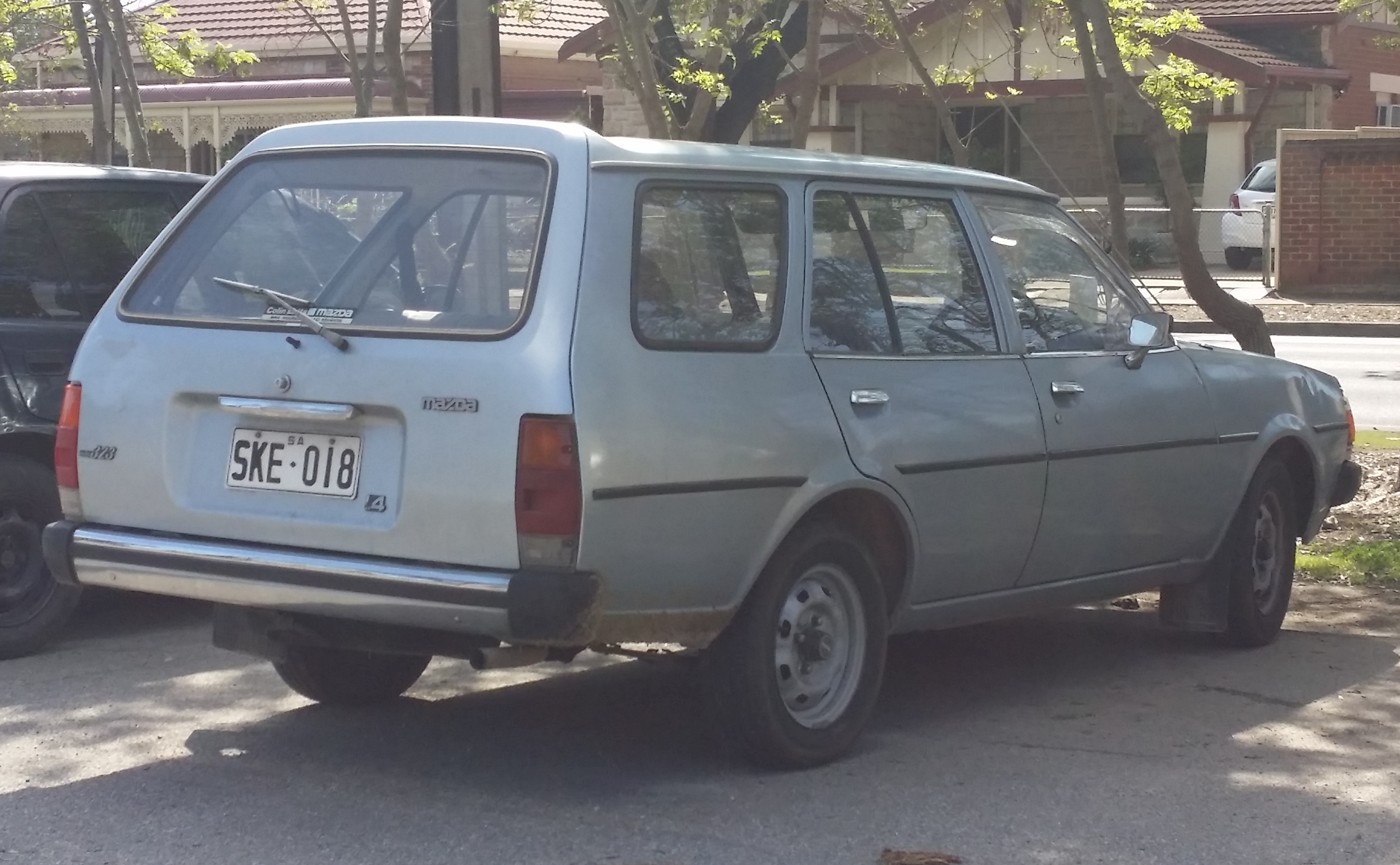
1978–1981 Mazda 323 5-door station wagon (Australia)

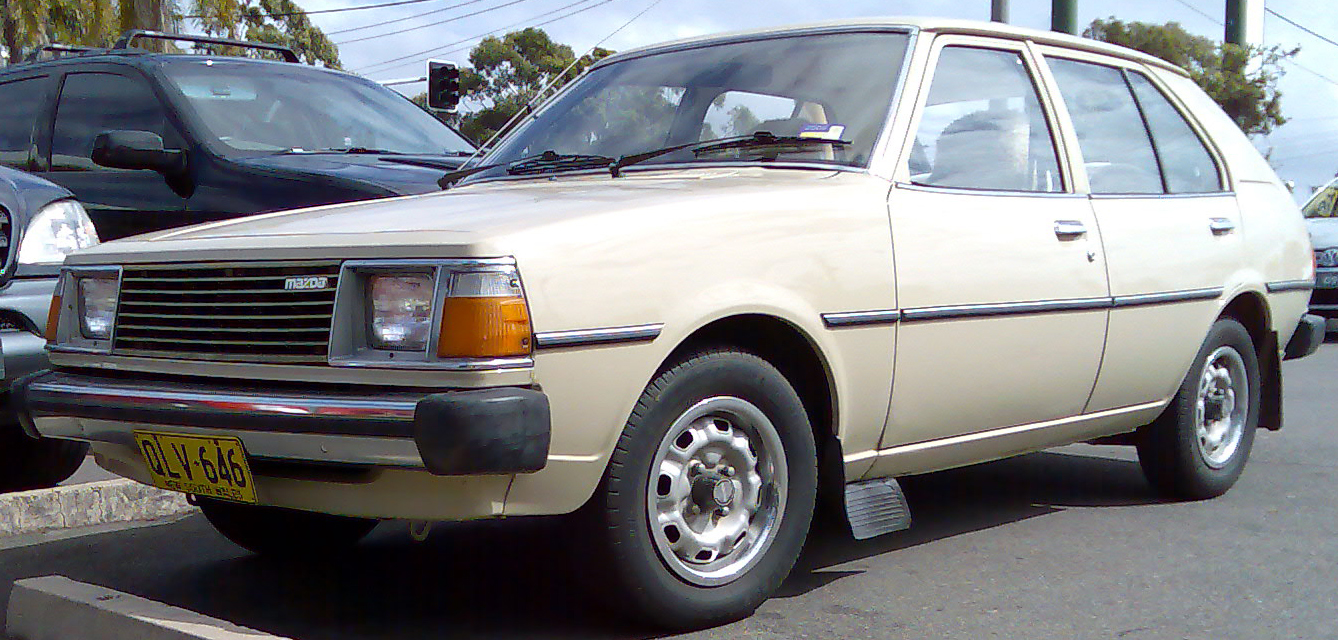
1979–1980 Mazda 323 1.4 5-door (FA4US, Australia)

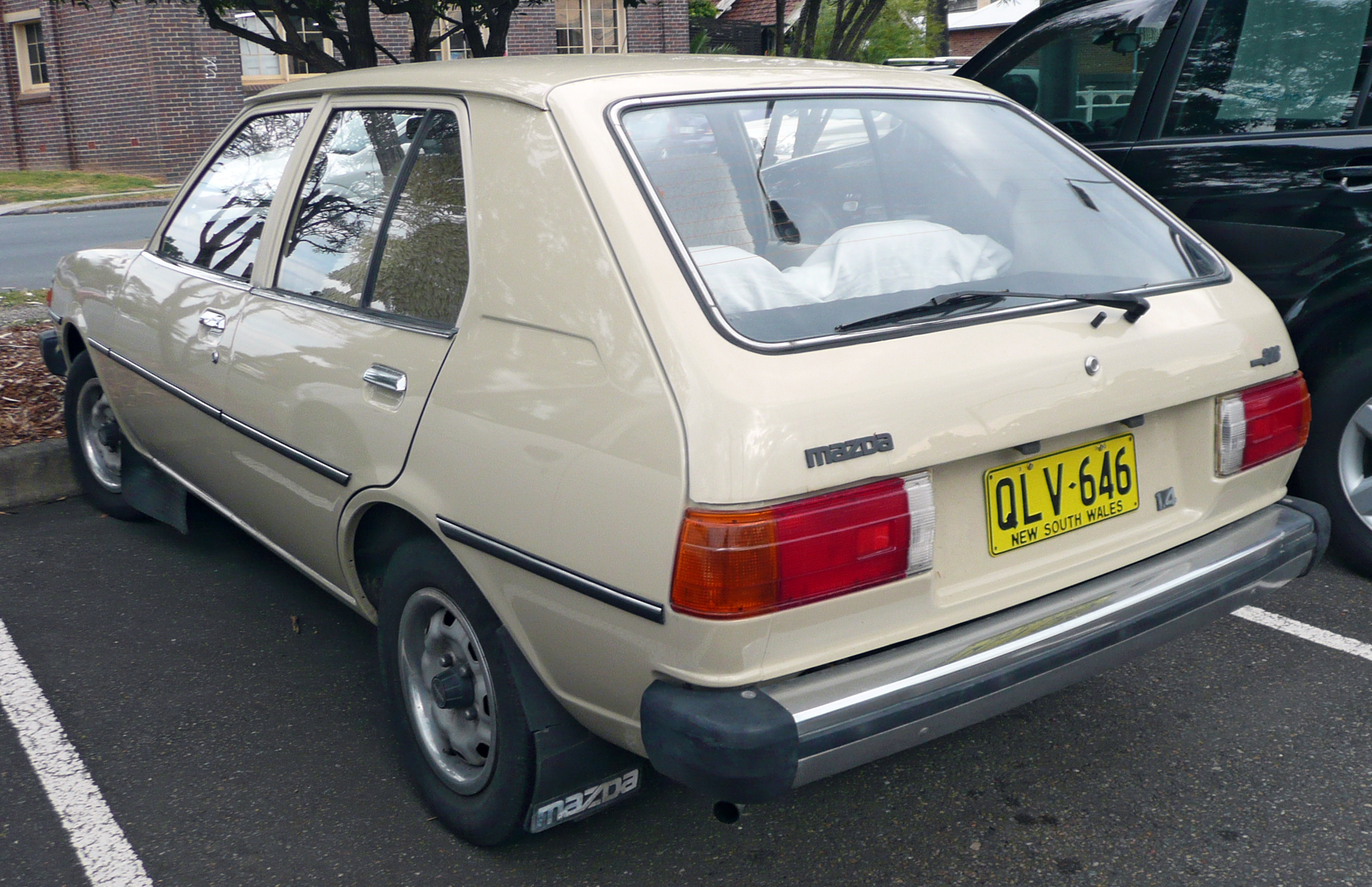
Rear view

Several of these were available in multiple trim levels.

Engines:

- 1.0 L PC, 45 PS (33 kW; 44 hp) / 51 lb⋅ft (69 N⋅m) – export only
- 1.3 L TC (1977.01–1980) 60 PS (44 kW; 59 hp) / 72 PS (53 kW) in Japan
- 1.4 L UC (1978.03–1980) 83 PS (61 kW) in Japan

In Australia the 1.3 had 45 kW (61 PS; 60 hp) at 5700 rpm while the bigger 1.4, introduced in July 1978, offered 48 kW (65 PS; 64 hp) at a somewhat lower engine speed of 5500 rpm. The 1.4 was accompanied by the new, better-equipped CS model which was only available with five-door bodywork.

Van engines:

- 1.3 L TC (1978.06–1986) 85 PS JIS (63 kW) (1979), 73 PS JIS net (54 kW) (later years), 60 PS DIN (44 kW) (export models)
- 1.4 L UC (1978.06–1986) 85 PS JIS (63 kW) (1979), 76 PS JIS net (56 kW) (later years)
- 1.5 L E5 (1982.10–1986) 70 PS DIN (51 kW) (wagon/van only)

A five-speed manual gearbox was introduced later as an alternative to the original four-speed manual gearbox. At the same time the original 7-inch (178 mm) round sealed beam headlights were replaced with square sealed beam units on all models except the van, together with a general styling and mechanical upgrade. A three-speed automatic gearbox was also available on the bigger engined models, it was first introduced (on the 1400) at the end of June 1978.

When the next generation front-wheel-drive Familia/323/GLC models were released in 1980, the wagon and van models continued unchanged, due to Mazda not developing wagon models for the newer range. A facelift however was given to the wagons in 1981, which gave the models the front clip (albeit with different bumpers) of the front-wheel-drive models. Production of the wagons continued to 1986, when a new front-wheel-drive model was introduced. Originally available with the 1.3- TC and 1.4-litre UC engines, in export markets the larger unit was replaced with the new 1.5-litre E5 engine for the 1983 model year.

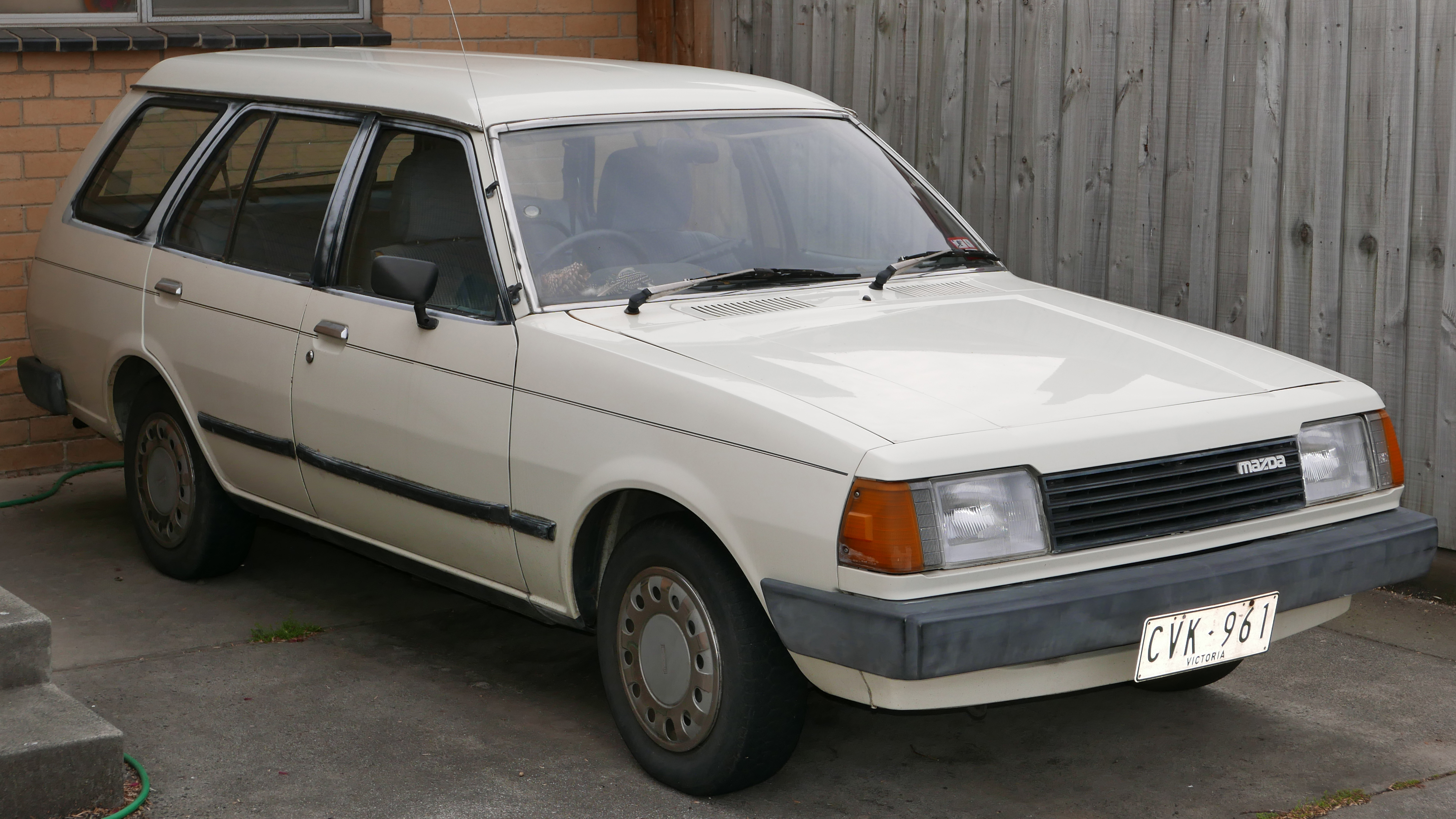
1981–1986 Mazda 323 5-door wagon (Australia)

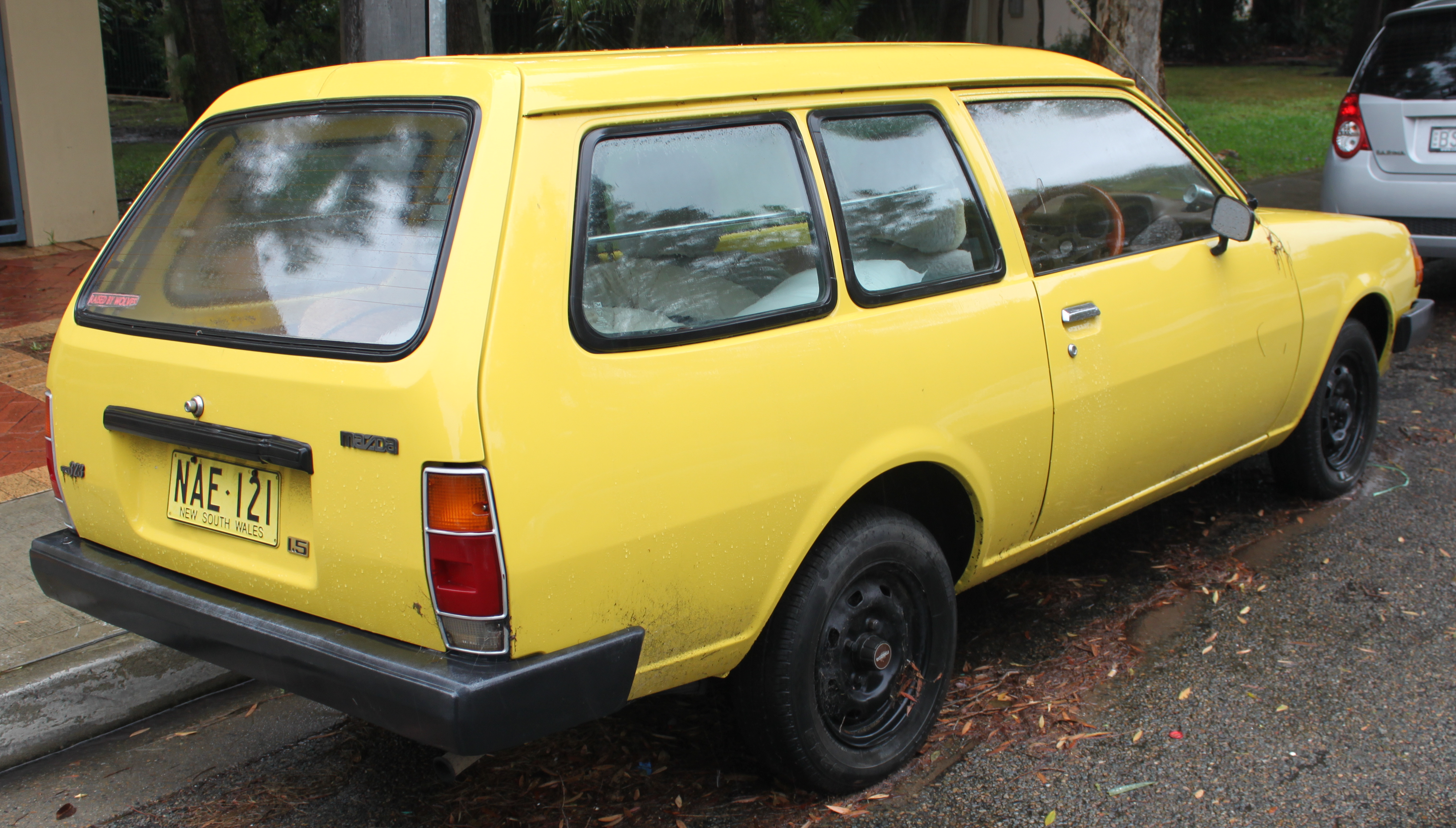
1981–1986 Mazda 323 3-door van (Australia)

North America

For the United States, the GLC, advertised as the Great Little Car, was only offered with one engine at a time. The new GLC overlapped with the old-style Mizer for part of 1977 and was produced through 1980 before being replaced by the next-generation GLC. The marketing campaign in the U.S. had the words "Great Little Car" set to the tune of Spanish Flea. Thanks to the safety bumpers mandated by federal regulations, the 1979 base GLC three-door weighed in at 1,995 lb (905 kg) and was 154.3 in (3,920 mm) long. The station wagon continued to be offered until the 1986 model year.

For the 1979 model year, the original 52 hp (39 kW) 1272 cc four was replaced with a 1415 cc engine producing 65 hp (48 kW). In addition to three- and five-door hatchbacks, as well as the wagon, there was also a GLC Sport version which offered a five-speed rather than the four-speed manual or the three-speed automatic installed in other versions. After the introduction of the front-wheel-drive GLC the carry-over station wagon's engine was replaced with the new E5 model of 1490 cc, although claimed power dropped somewhat, to 63 hp (47 kW).

South Africa

In South Africa, the five-door-only 323 proved an immediate success. The 1.3 was gradually replaced by the larger 1.4 from July 1978, while a Special and a CS model were added at the low and high ends of the lineup respectively, complementing the existing De Luxe models. Well-equipped versions of the 1978 facelift model were sold as the "323 GLC" in South Africa. A 1600-cc model was also available in South Africa – however this model did not have a Mazda engine, unlike the rest of the range. To satisfy that country's local content regulations, a locally built Mitsubishi Saturn 1.6-litre unit was used. This produces 77 PS (57 kW) and was the most powerful engine to be installed in the FA-series Familia/323. It arrived in early 1979, but period testers felt that the less-revvy 1.6 provided very little that the 1.4 did not offer, and could not be considered to be worth the price. Fuel consumption dropped, while top speed of 148 km/h (92 mph) was only marginally higher than the 145 km/h (90 mph) of the smaller version. Sigma also fielded a rotary-engined 323 in the South African national rally championship.

Indonesia

In Indonesia the third-generation Familia was marketed by Indomobil Group twice, the first time as the 323 hatchback from 1977 to 1980, and the second time around as the low-cost alternative of the popular Toyota Kijang and fellow Indomobil Group product's Suzuki Carry Extra/Futura; low-price "Mazda MR90" (hatchback) between December 1990 to 1993, "Mazda Baby Boomers" (hatchback) between 1993 and 1995, and as the "Mazda Vantrend" (station wagon and special limited order as high roof van or pickup) between 1993 and 1997. The Vantrend and its derivatives were also marketed as the Mazda M1400. The name MR90 stands for "Mobil Rakyat 90" (people's car for the 1990s) as it was intended to become a national car project. This was scuppered by the appearance of the Timor 515 project. The MR90 and its successors did see limited exports to small markets such as Fiji and Sri Lanka. There was also a better equipped GLX version available. The Baby Boomers was a lightly facelifted variant with new bumpers and a rear spoiler, for a more sporty appearance overall.

The 1990s versions built by Indomobil have modernized headlights (same as on the Mazda 626 (GC), while Vantrend adopted the pre-facelift North American market quad headlights version) and bumpers. These alterations mean that the overall length increased, up to 3,970 mm (156 in) for the MR90 hatchback. Only the 70 PS (51 kW) UC 1.4-litre engine was offered, in combination with a five-speed transmission. The project was suggested to and given the green light by Mazda's Senior Managing Director Keiji Asano while he was on a trip to Indonesia in 1986. Sold alongside the seventh generation 323, an MR90 cost less than half the price of the newer model, but still more expensive than Toyota Kijang and Suzuki Carry "minibuses" as the country imposed 30% tax for saloons. In the past hatchback and wagon were classified as sedan Indonesia, but then revised as "minibus" in early 2000s. This changes boosting the sales of hatchbacks and started the downfall of sedans popularity in Indonesia.

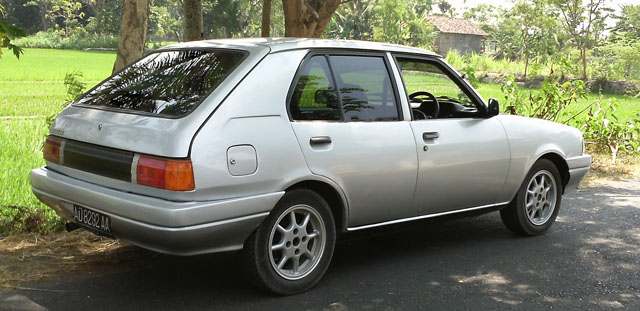
Mazda MR90

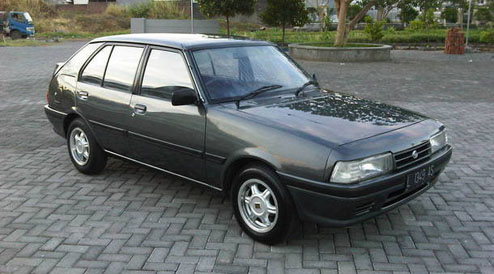
Mazda Baby Boomers

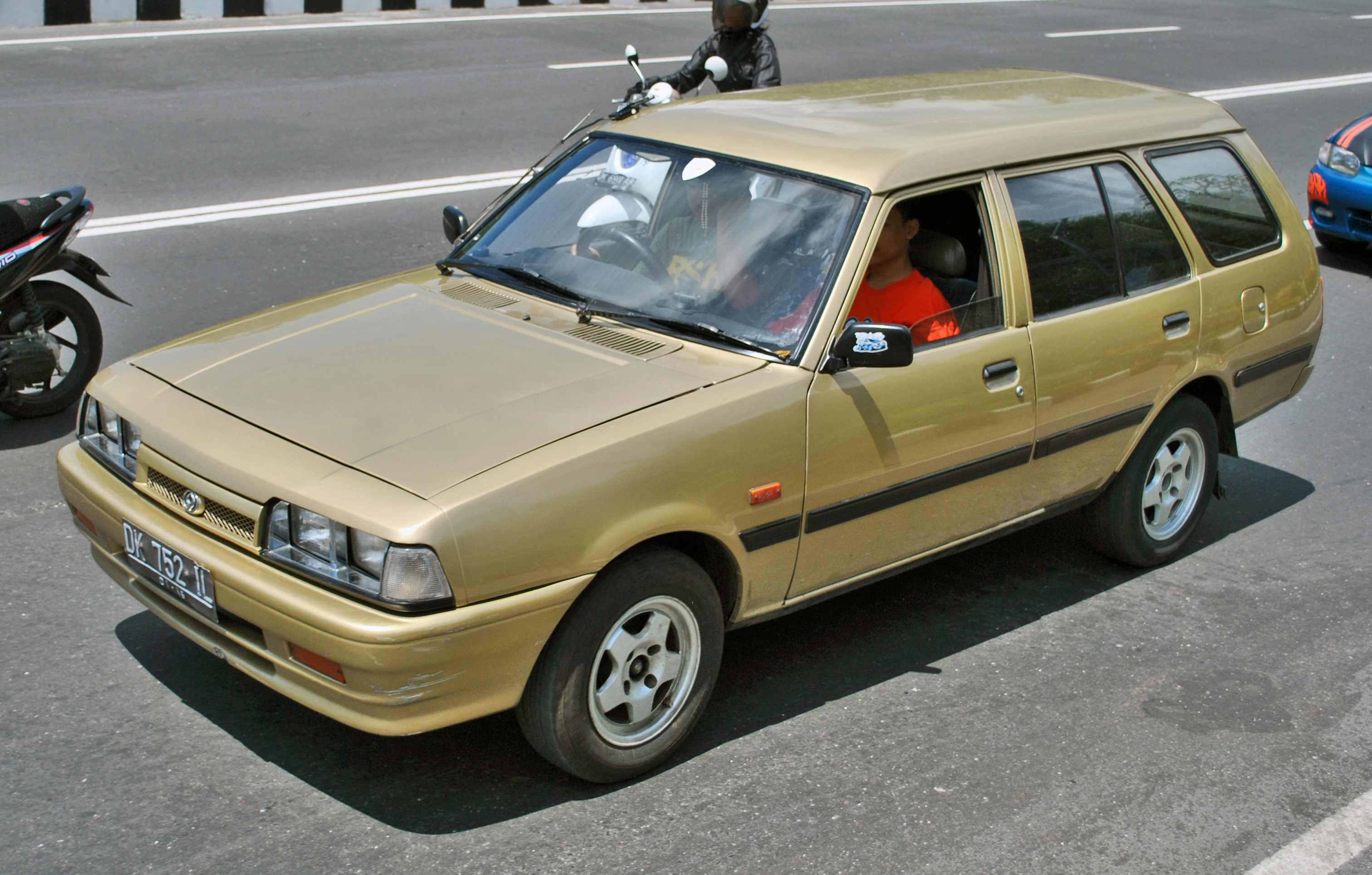
Mazda Vantrend

Around this time, a coachbuilder company called PT. Marvia Graha Motor (owned by Marvy Apandi, the executive director of Indomobil Group) built around 50 units replica of Porsche 911 (964) based on MR90 hatchbacks. While retaining the original 1.4-litre engine, 5-speed manual gearbox, suspension and dashboard (later models has 964 dashboard replica), the body was made from fiberglass by using the 964 production tools from VW Group. At that time Indomobil had a trial by assembling two Porsche 964 and planned to build Porsche and Audi in Indonesia to compete with BMW and Mercedes-Benz. The plan was terminated because the production quality was below VW Group's standard.

== Fifth generation (BD; 1980) ==
Fifth generation (BD)
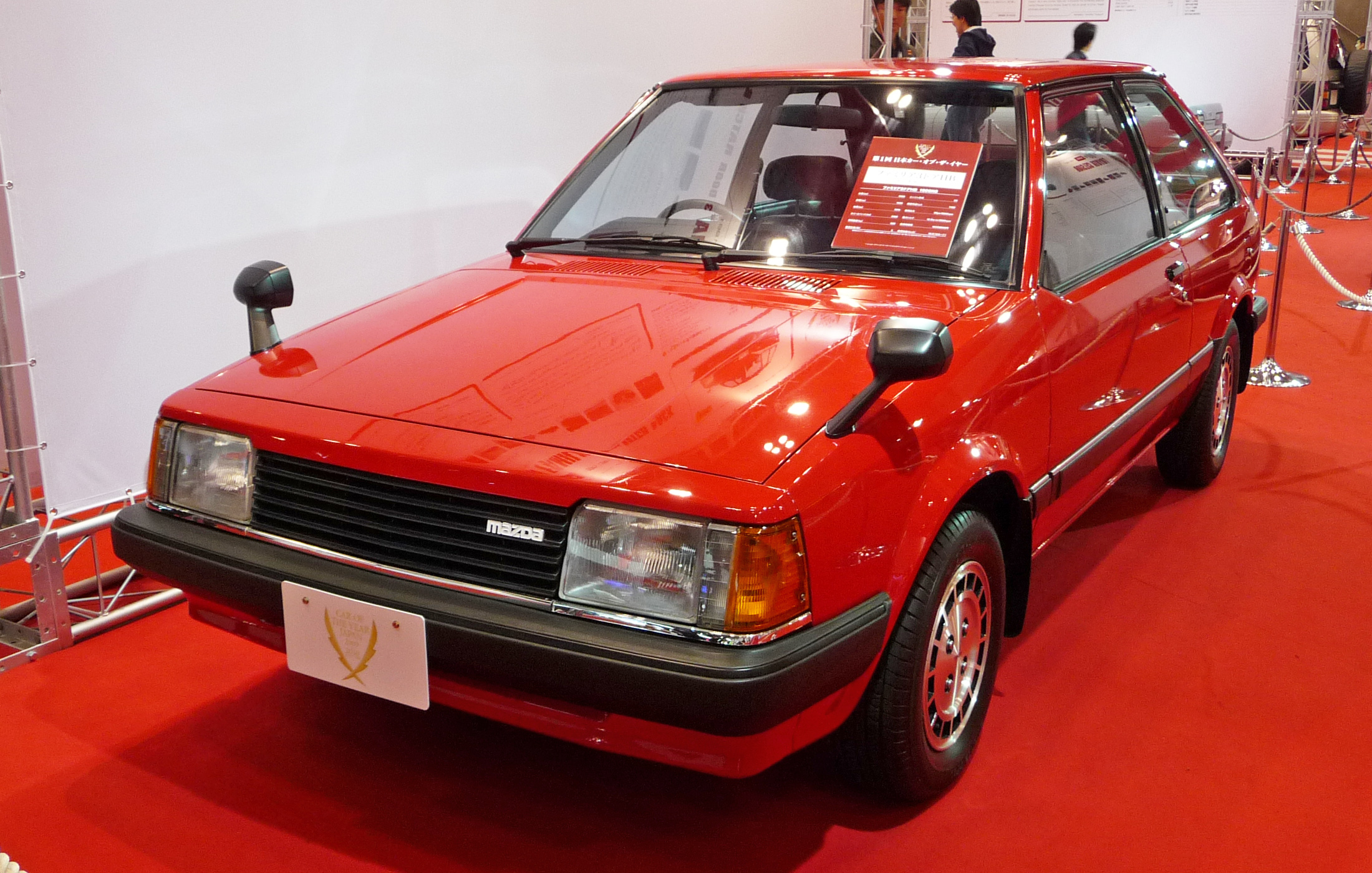

Overview
- Also called: Mazda 323; Mazda GLC
- Production: 1980–1985; 1984–1986 (Colombia)
- Assembly: Japan: Hiroshima (1980–1982); Japan: Hōfu; Colombia: Bogotá (CCA); Indonesia: Jakarta (PT. National Motors); New Zealand: Ōtāhuhu, Auckland; South Africa: Silverton, Pretoria (Sigma Motor Corporation); Zimbabwe: Willowvale (WMMI)

Body and chassis
- Body style: 3-door hatchback; 5-door hatchback; 4-door saloon
- Layout: Front-engine, front-wheel-drive
- Platform: Mazda BD platform
- Related: Ford Laser; Ford Meteor

Powertrain
- Engine: 1.1 L E1 I4; 1.3 L E3 I4; 1.5 L E5 I4

Dimensions
- Wheelbase: 2,365 mm (93.1 in)
- Length: 3,955 mm (155.7 in) (hatchback); 4,155 mm (163.6 in) (saloon)
- Width: 1,630 mm (64.2 in)
- Height: 1,375 mm (54.1 in)
- Curb weight: 780–830 kg (1,720–1,830 lb)

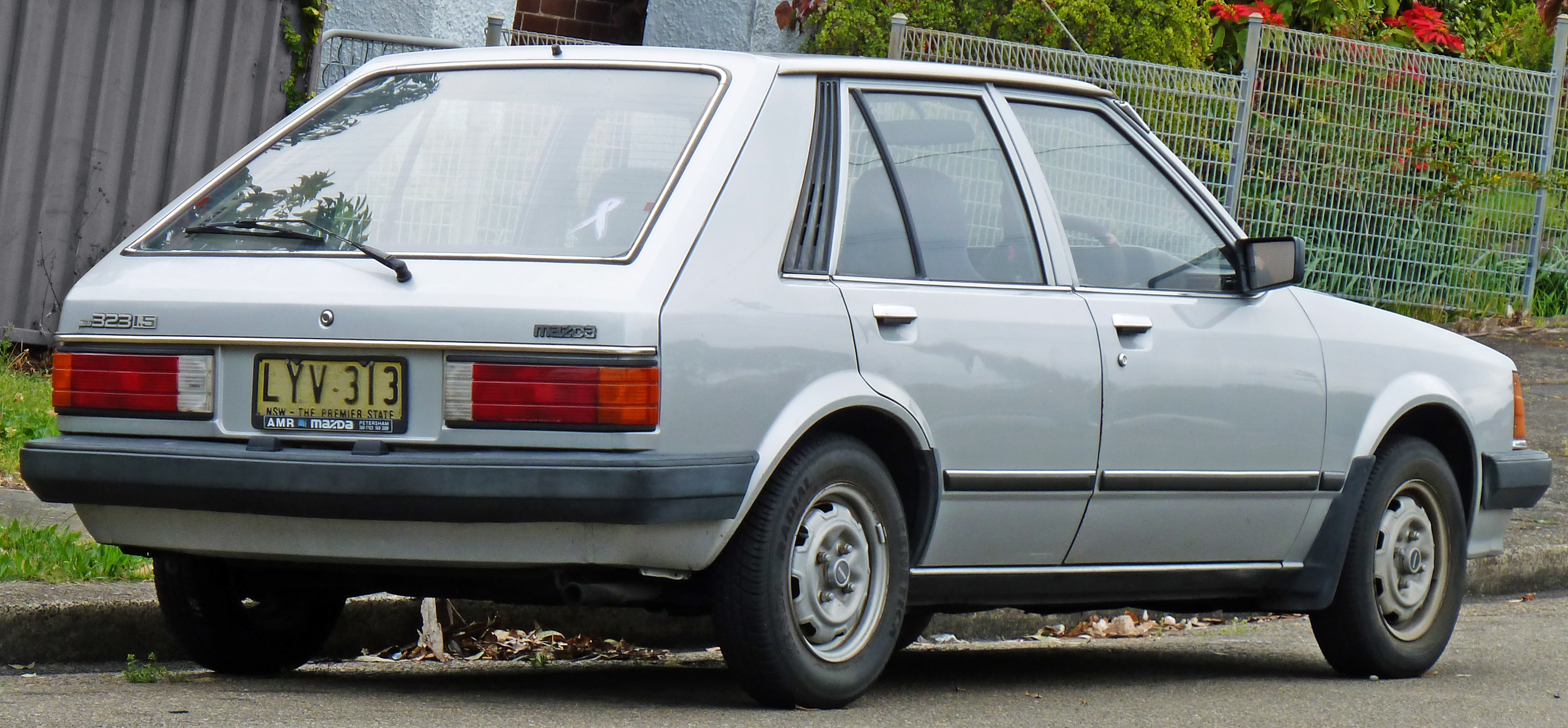
Hatchback (pre–facelift)

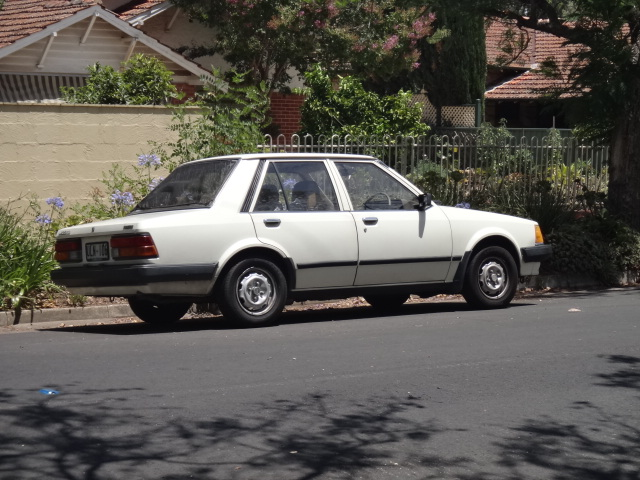
Saloon (pre-facelift)

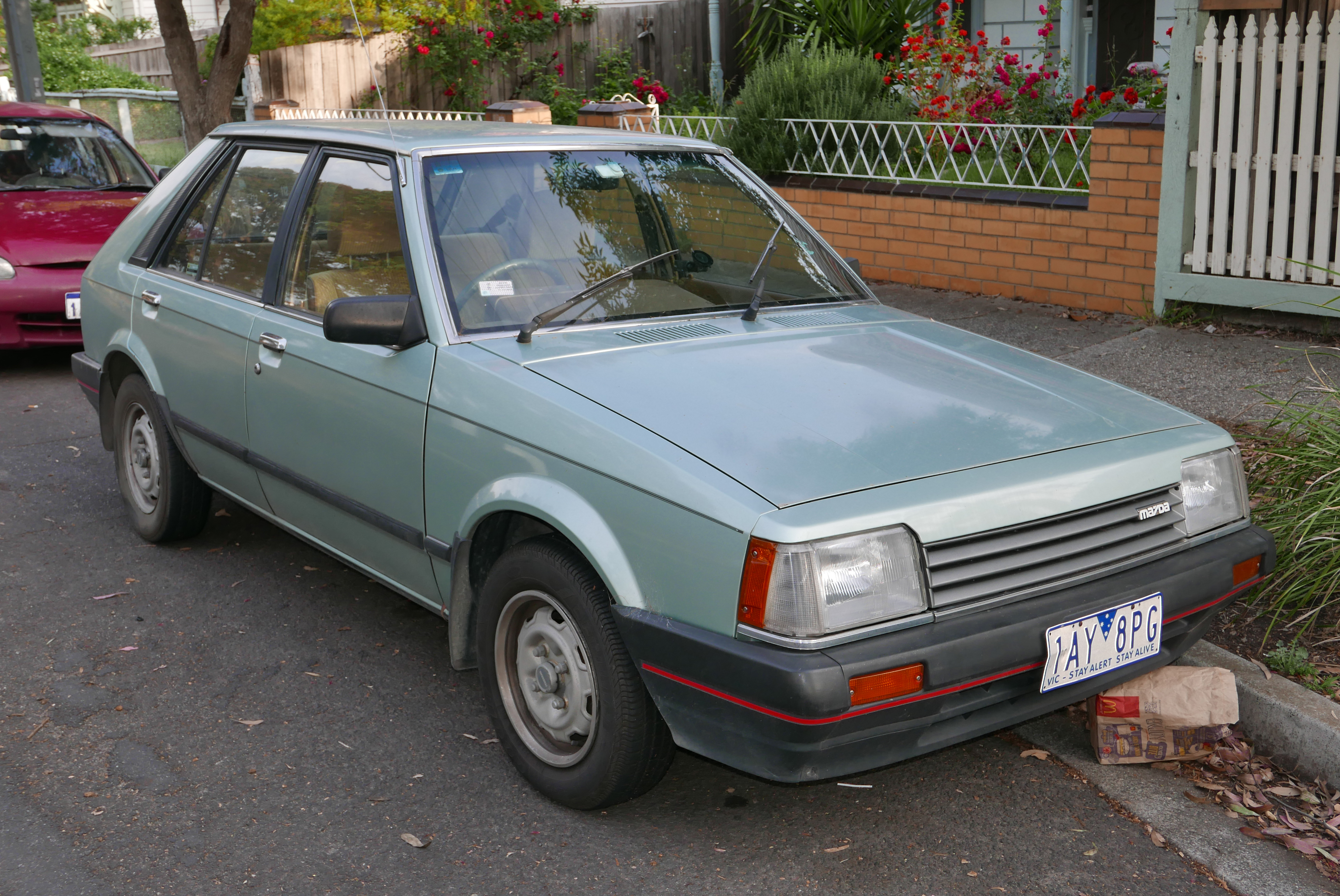

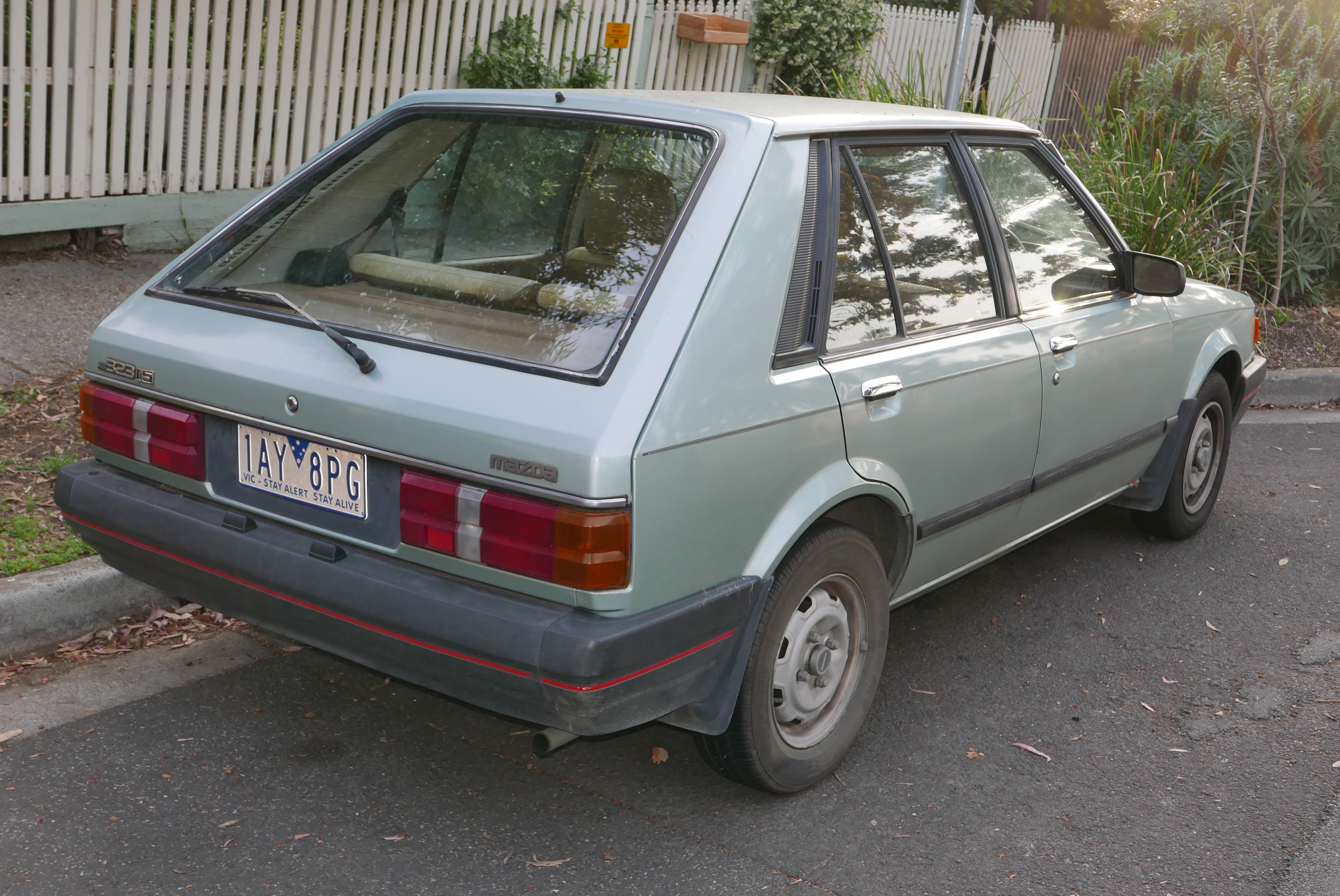
Hatchback (facelift)

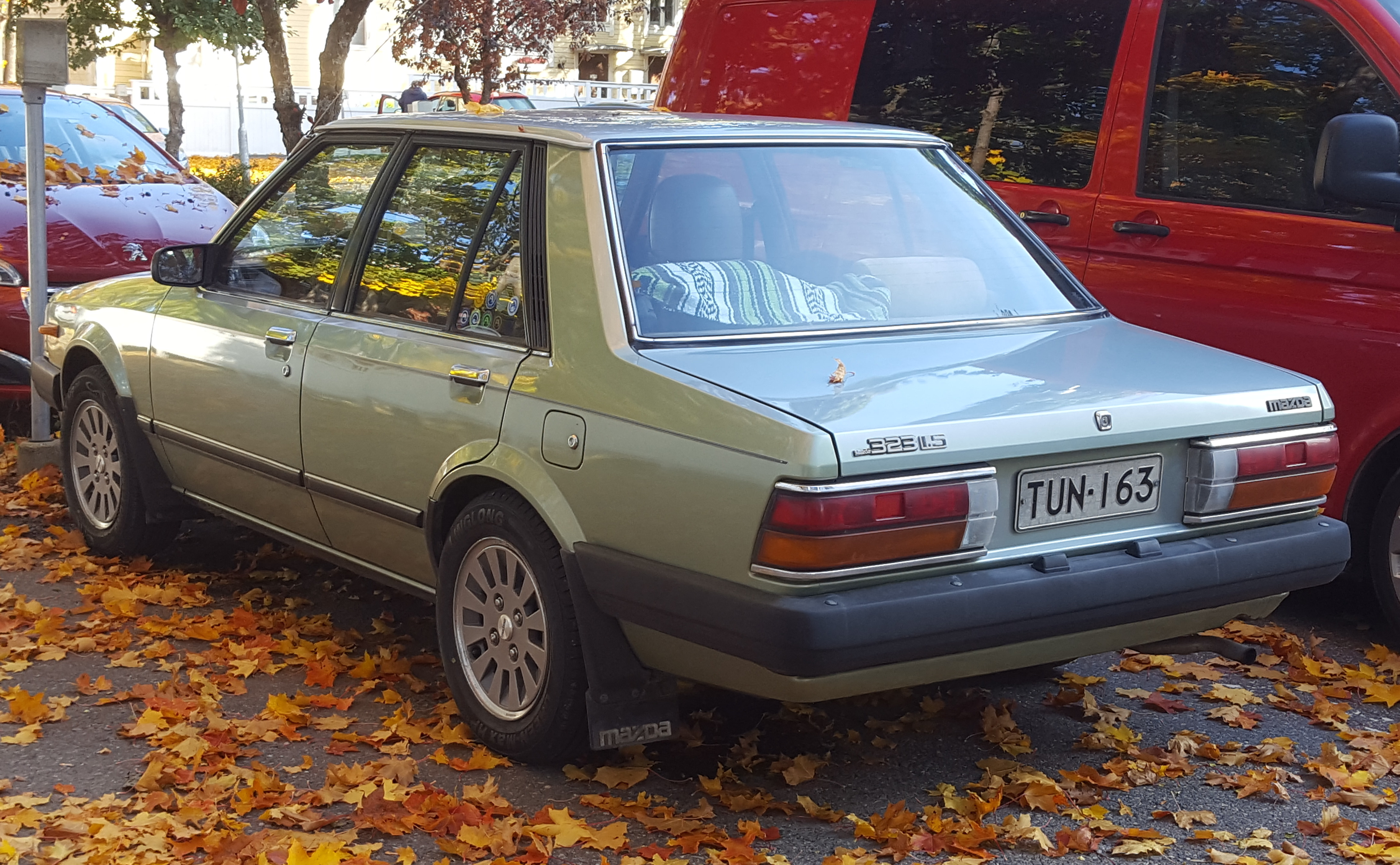
Saloon (facelift) (non-standard wheels)

The fifth generation Familia (BD), first shown on 2 June 1980, was entirely new – it was Mazda's first front-engine, front-wheel-drive subcompact car, and was available as a hatchback and saloon. It was developed with input from Ford, which in 1979 had acquired a stake in the Japanese manufacturer, and had a twin called the Ford Laser (and Ford Meteor, for its four-door saloon model in Australia).

At its introduction in 1980, it won the first Car of the Year Japan Award.

The new Mazda E engine-series, loosely based on the preceding PC/TC/UC series, was developed expressly for the BD and was offered in three different displacements. The smallest 1.1-litre E1 unit was reserved for certain export markets where the tax structures suited it. Chassis codes were BD1011/BD1031/BD1051 depending on the engine installed.

Engines:

- 1.1 L (1071 cc) E1, 1 barrel, 55 PS (40 kW; 54 hp) / 79 N⋅m (58 lb⋅ft)
- 1.3 L (1296 cc) E3, 2 barrel, 68 PS (50 kW; 67 hp) / 95 N⋅m (70 lb⋅ft)
- 1.5 L (1490 cc) E5, 2 barrel, 75 PS (55 kW; 74 hp) / 115 N⋅m (85 lb⋅ft)
- 1.5 L (1490 cc) E5S, 2x2 barrel, 88 PS (65 kW; 87 hp) / 120 N⋅m (89 lb⋅ft)

The most powerful version was marketed as the "323 GT" in European markets. The Familia/323 underwent a facelift in January 1983.

For the Japanese market other top end models were offered, originally the three-door Familia XGI with a 1,500 cc single cam, multi-point fuel-injected engine. In June 1983 the turbocharged XGI Turbo was added, Mazda's first turbocharged piston engine. It had a particularly small turbocharger, for better low-end response. Period commentators complimented its linear and smooth power delivery. The XG Turbo also received a suitably updated chassis and wheels to handle the 115 PS (85 kW). The Familia saloon and their twin, the Ford Laser S, was also offered with the same specifications but in limited numbers. Claimed outputs in the Japanese market were considerably higher than in export countries, due to the differing JIS standard rather than DIN. Period sources suggest subtracting ten percent from the JIS numbers.

This particular Familia was a strong comeback for Mazda in the Japanese market, even outselling the Toyota Corolla on several occasions. The four-door saloon was equipped with a reverse-rake front grille and lights in the Japanese market, to make it appear more "senior". The same front design was used for the GA/GB Ford Meteor.

The 1980 Familia/323 was the first front-engine, front-wheel-drive vehicle from Mazda since the R130. This generation of 323 was Wheels magazine's car of the year for 1980. The existing station wagon version, simply a facelifted version of the previous rear-drive model (fitted with the square headlights and grille from the new model), was sold in parallel with the BD. The wagon was available with either three or five doors and was equipped either with the old 1272 cc TC engine or the 1415 cc UC. The 1.4 was replaced from 1983 with the newly developed 1490 cc E5 engine. The TC 1.3 produces 60 PS (44 kW) while the larger versions offer 70 PS (51 kW). By 1985, the old 1.3 was replaced by the 1296 cc E3 engine with 68 PS (50 kW); it was only available with the three-door station wagon body.

=== Export markets ===
The front-wheel-drive 323 was introduced in Europe in September 1980, nearly simultaneously to its cousin and competitor the Ford Escort. The four-door saloon version followed in January 1981, and one month later automatic-equipped models became available to European buyers.

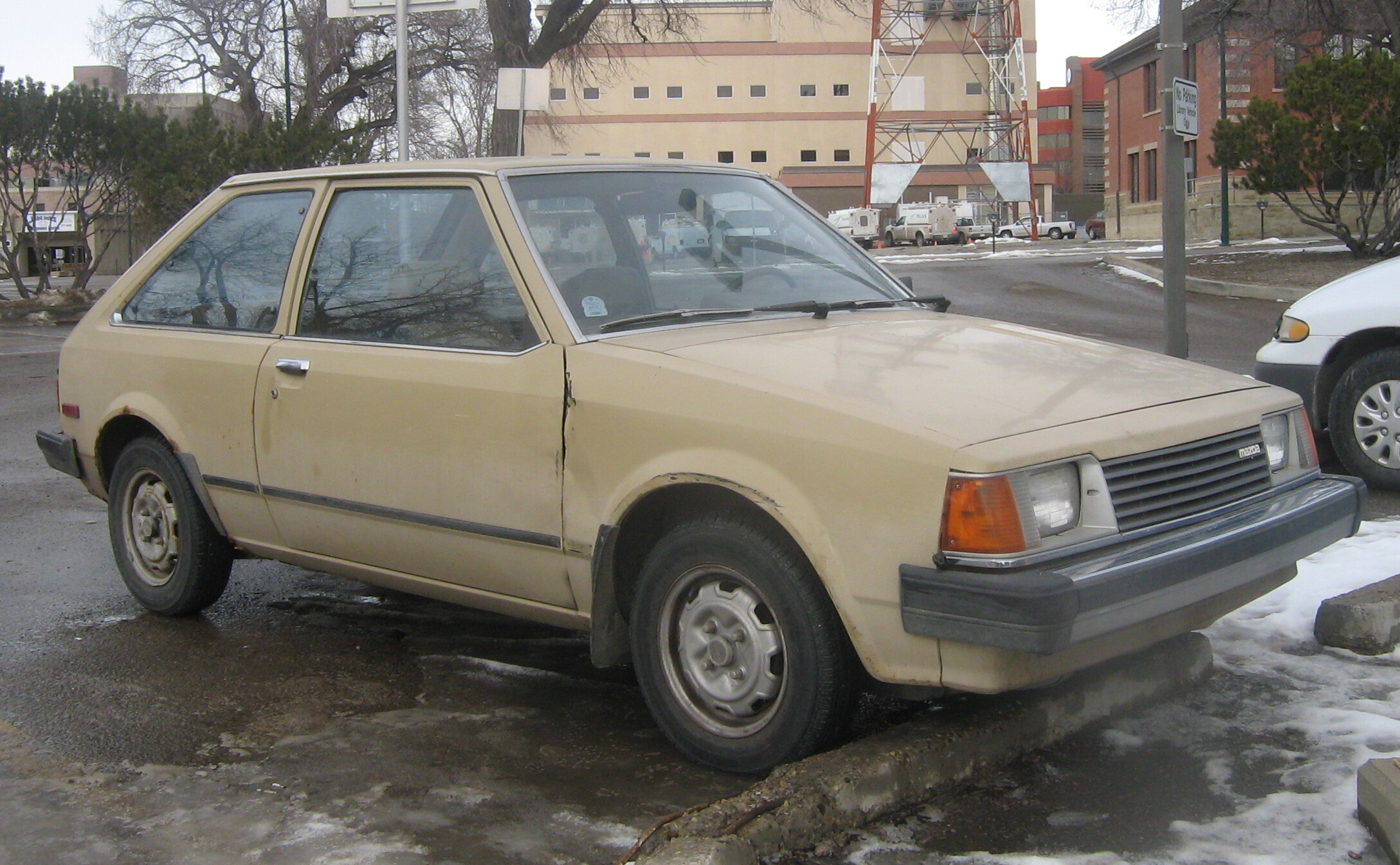
1981–1982 Mazda GLC (North American version of Familia/323)

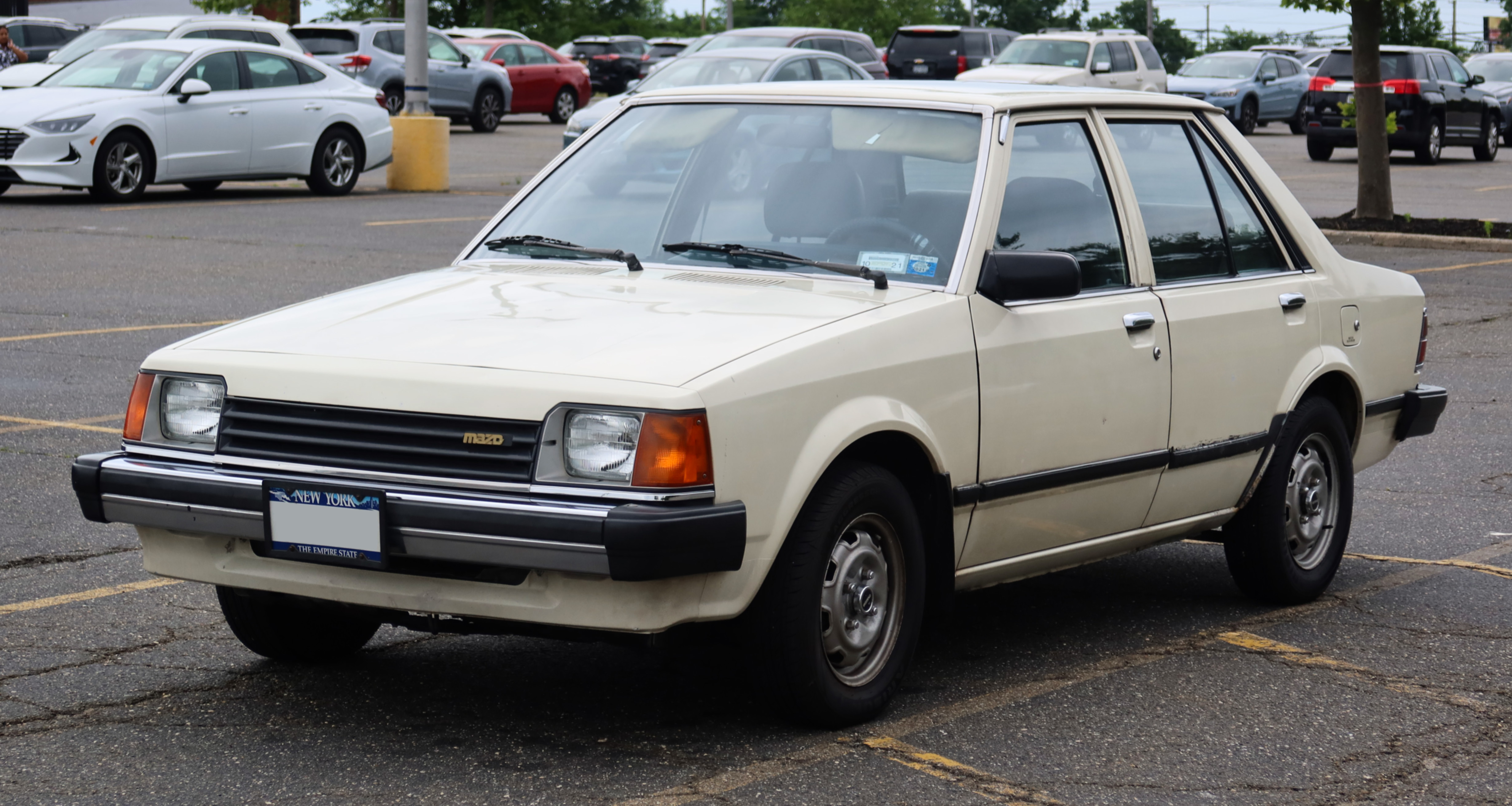
1983–1985 Mazda GLC 4-door saloon

=== GLC (1981–1985) ===
The equivalent American Mazda GLC (Great Little Car) appeared in the 1981 model year, although the rear-wheel drive wagon also continued to be offered. It was only offered with a single engine – the twin-barrel 1.5-litre with 68 hp (51 kW)—and lasted through 1985, after which it was replaced by the next-generation Mazda 323. With this, the GLC nameplate was retired. The BD was the only front-wheel drive Mazda vehicle using the GLC name. Originally it was offered with three- or five-door bodywork, in standard, Custom, Custom L, or Sport equipment levels. The five-door only came as a Custom and was sold only in Hawaii and Puerto Rico. All cars received exposed rectangular sealed-beam units. The later four-door saloon, introduced for 1983, was available in Custom, Custom L, and Sport models.

The Sport received blacked out trim, a steering wheel borrowed from the RX-7, full instrumentation, and a special rear interior which closely integrates the side trim with the rear seat design – an early iteration of a design philosophy taken to its extreme with the 1988 Persona and the 1990 Eunos Cosmo. Unlike the sporting 323s in other markets, the Sport only received special hubcaps, rather than alloy wheels. For 1982, the Sport was made to live up to its name a little bit more, with the installation of a front anti-roll bar and cast aluminum wheels. The five-door GLC gained a fully carpeted trunk for 1982.

== Sixth generation (BF; 1985) ==
Sixth generation (BF)
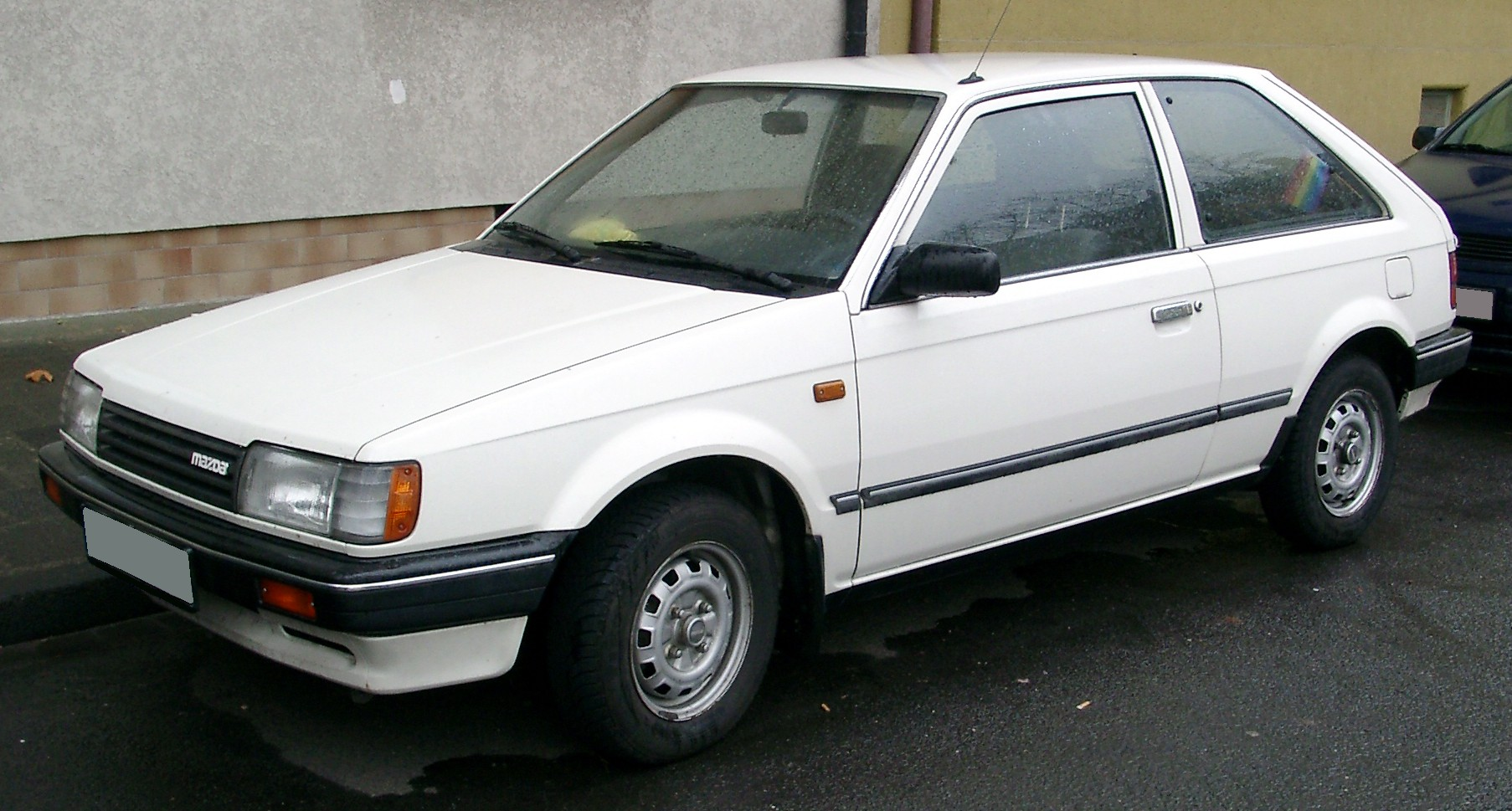
- 1985–1987 Mazda 323 3-door hatchback (Europe)

Overview
- Also called: Mazda 323; Ford Laser; Ford Tonic; Mercury Tracer; Sao Penza
- Production: 1985–1989; 1985–1994 (wagon); 1986–2004 (Colombia)
- Assembly: Japan: Hofu; Colombia: Bogotá (CCA); Indonesia: Jakarta (PT. National Motors); South Africa: Silverton, Pretoria (Samcor); Thailand: Rayong; New Zealand: Ōtāhuhu; Wiri; Zimbabwe: Willowvale (WMMI)

Body and chassis
- Body style: 2-door convertible; 3/5-door hatchback; 4-door saloon; 5-door wagon
- Layout: Front-engine, front-wheel-drive; Front-engine, all-wheel-drive
- Platform: Mazda BF platform
- Related: Mazda Étude; Ford Bantam; Mazda Rustler

Powertrain
- Engine: petrol: 1.3 L E3 I4; 1.5 L E5 I4; 1.5 L E5 turbo I4; 1.6 L B6 I4; 1.6 L B6T turbo I4; Diesel: 1.7 L PN I4
- Transmission: 3-speed Mazda F3A automatic; 4-speed manual; 5-speed manual

Dimensions
- Wheelbase: 2,400 mm (94.5 in)
- Length: Hatchback: 4,110 mm (161.8 in); Saloon/wagon: 4,310 mm (169.7 in)
- Width: 1,645 mm (64.8 in)
- Height: Saloon/hatchback: 1,390 mm (54.7 in); Wagon: 1,430 mm (56.3 in)
- Curb weight: 936 kg (2,064 lb)

In January 1985, the sixth generation Familia/323 was fully renewed. It was available as a hatchback (with three or five doors) or four-door saloon only for the first year; wagon and cabriolet models were added in November 1985 and March 1986 respectively. The wagon was commonly sold as a light van in Japan, but for the first time it was also available as a passenger-oriented wagon model in the Japanese domestic market. In November 1986, cumulative production of Familias (excluding vans and pickups) reached five million units; at the time, Mazda was building about 40,000 Familia/323s per month. In January 1987 a personal coupé version with its own bodywork, the Étude, was added. In February 1987 the Familia range underwent a light facelift that included replacing the old E engines with the more modern B series. In some markets, such as Indonesia, the E engine continued to be installed after the facelift.

This generation of the Familia/323 was also available in a version with a turbocharged DOHC engine, with either front- or four-wheel drive, producing 140 PS (103 kW). The 4WD version (sold in either a lightweight GT or fully optioned GT-X grade) introduced in October 1985, saw some success in rally's Group A category. A limited production Japanese-only homologation special, the 4WD GT-Ae, appeared May 1988 and offered an additional ten horsepower and viscous rear limited slip differential (similar to the later BG Familia). Full time four-wheel drive was also available in more pedestrian versions like the 1.5 hatchback.

There was also a 1.7-litre diesel version available with 58 PS (43 kW) at 4300 rpm and 112 N⋅m (83 lb⋅ft) at 2800 rpm. Introduced in July 1985, it is a naturally aspirated, indirect injection engine.

As with the earlier 323 Wagon/Familia Van, the wagon (BW) skipped the succeeding generational change and continued to be available alongside the next generation in most markets. It was later updated with a new grille and continued to be available until 1994/95. When the saloons and hatchbacks received new engines in late 1987, the vans continued to use the old E-series units for a little longer.

A factory-built convertible body was introduced in March 1986 in both Mazda 323 and Ford Laser (323 panels from firewall back) versions, initially running the 1.5-litre turbocharged E5T engine but later switching to the 1.6-litre DOHC B6D.

Engines (Japanese domestic market):

- 1985–1987 – 1.3 L (1,296 cc) E3, 2 barrel, 8-valve, 74 PS (54 kW; 73 hp) Gross / 10.5 kg⋅m (103 N⋅m; 76 lb⋅ft)
- 1987–1989 – 1.3 L (1,323 cc) B3, 2 barrel, 8-valve, 67 PS (49 kW; 66 hp) Net / 10.4 kg⋅m (102 N⋅m; 75 lb⋅ft)
- 1985–1987 – 1.5 L (1,490 cc) E5, 2 barrel carburettor, 8-valve, 85 PS (63 kW; 84 hp) Gross / 12.3 kg⋅m (121 N⋅m; 89 lb⋅ft) Gross – Net rating 70 PS (51 kW; 69 hp) / 11.2 kg⋅m (110 N⋅m; 81 lb⋅ft)
- 1985–1987 – 1.5 L (1,490 cc) E5, EGi, 8-valve, 95 PS (70 kW; 94 hp) Gross/12.6 kg⋅m (124 N⋅m; 91 lb⋅ft) Gross – Net rating 76 PS (56 kW; 75 hp) / 11.6 kg⋅m (114 N⋅m; 84 lb⋅ft)
- 1985–1987 – 1.5 L (1,490 cc) E5T, turbo EGi, 8-valve, 115 PS (85 kW; 113 hp) Gross / 16.5 kg⋅m (162 N⋅m; 119 lb⋅ft)
- 1987–1989 – 1.5 L (1,498 cc) B5, 2 barrel, 12-valve, 76 PS (56 kW; 75 hp) Net / 11.4 kg⋅m (112 N⋅m; 82 lb⋅ft)
- 1987–1989 – 1.6 L (1,597 cc) B6, EGi, 8-valve, 85 PS (63 kW; 84 hp) Net / 12.5 kg⋅m (123 N⋅m; 90 lb⋅ft)
- 1986–1989 – 1.6 L (1,597 cc) B6D, EGi, 16-valve, 110 PS (81 kW; 108 hp) Net / 13.5 kg⋅m (132 N⋅m; 98 lb⋅ft)
- 1985–1989 – 1.6 L (1,597 cc) B6T, turbo EGi, 16-valve, 140 PS (103 kW; 138 hp) Net / 19.0 kg⋅m (186 N⋅m; 137 lb⋅ft)
- 1985–1989 – 1.7 L (1,720 cc) PN, diesel, 8-valve, 59 PS (43 kW; 58 hp) Gross / 10.8 kg⋅m (106 N⋅m; 78 lb⋅ft) Gross – Net rating 55 PS (40 kW; 54 hp) / 10.2 kg⋅m (100 N⋅m; 74 lb⋅ft), 1987–1989; Net rating: 58 PS (43 kW; 57 hp) / 10.7 kg⋅m (105 N⋅m; 77 lb⋅ft)

=== Export markets ===
The 1985 Familia spawned a Ford Laser twin sold in the Asia-Pacific. The Laser saloon and wagon were nearly identical to the Familia but with a Ford grille. By contrast the Laser hatchback model (which was sold in the U.S. as the Mercury Tracer) used completely different panels from the Familia's.

Engines (European models unless otherwise noted):

- 1985–1987 – 1.1 L (1,071 cc) E1, 2 barrel, 8-valve, 55 PS (40 kW; 54 hp) / 59 lb⋅ft (80 N⋅m)
- 1985–1987 – 1.3 L (1,296 cc) E3, 2 barrel, 8-valve, 68 PS (50 kW; 67 hp) / 71 lb⋅ft (96 N⋅m) – 60 PS (44 kW; 59 hp) in some markets, 65 PS in Switzerland
- 1987–1989 – 1.3 L (1,323 cc) B3, 2 barrel, 8-valve, 66 PS (49 kW; 65 hp) / 74 lb⋅ft (100 N⋅m)
- 1987–1989 – 1.5 L (1,498 cc) B5, 2 barrel, 12-valve, 73 PS (54 kW; 72 hp) / 81 lb⋅ft (110 N⋅m)
- 1985–1989 – 1.6 L (1,597 cc) B6, 8-valve, 85 PS (63 kW; 84 hp) / 90 lb⋅ft (122 N⋅m)
- 1985–1989 – 1.6 L (1,597 cc) B6T, turbo, 16-valve, 140 PS (103 kW; 138 hp) / 138 lb⋅ft (187 N⋅m)
- 1988–1991 – 2.0 L (1,998 cc) FE-SOHC, EFi, 8-valve, 118 PS (87 kW; 116 hp) / 131 lb⋅ft (178 N⋅m) (South Africa only)
- 1991–1994 – 2.0 L (1,998 cc) FE-DOHC, EFi, 16-valve, 146 PS (107 kW; 144 hp) / 136 lb⋅ft (184 N⋅m) (South Africa only)
- 1986–199? – 1.7 L (1,720 cc) PN, diesel, 8-valve, 57 PS (42 kW; 56 hp)
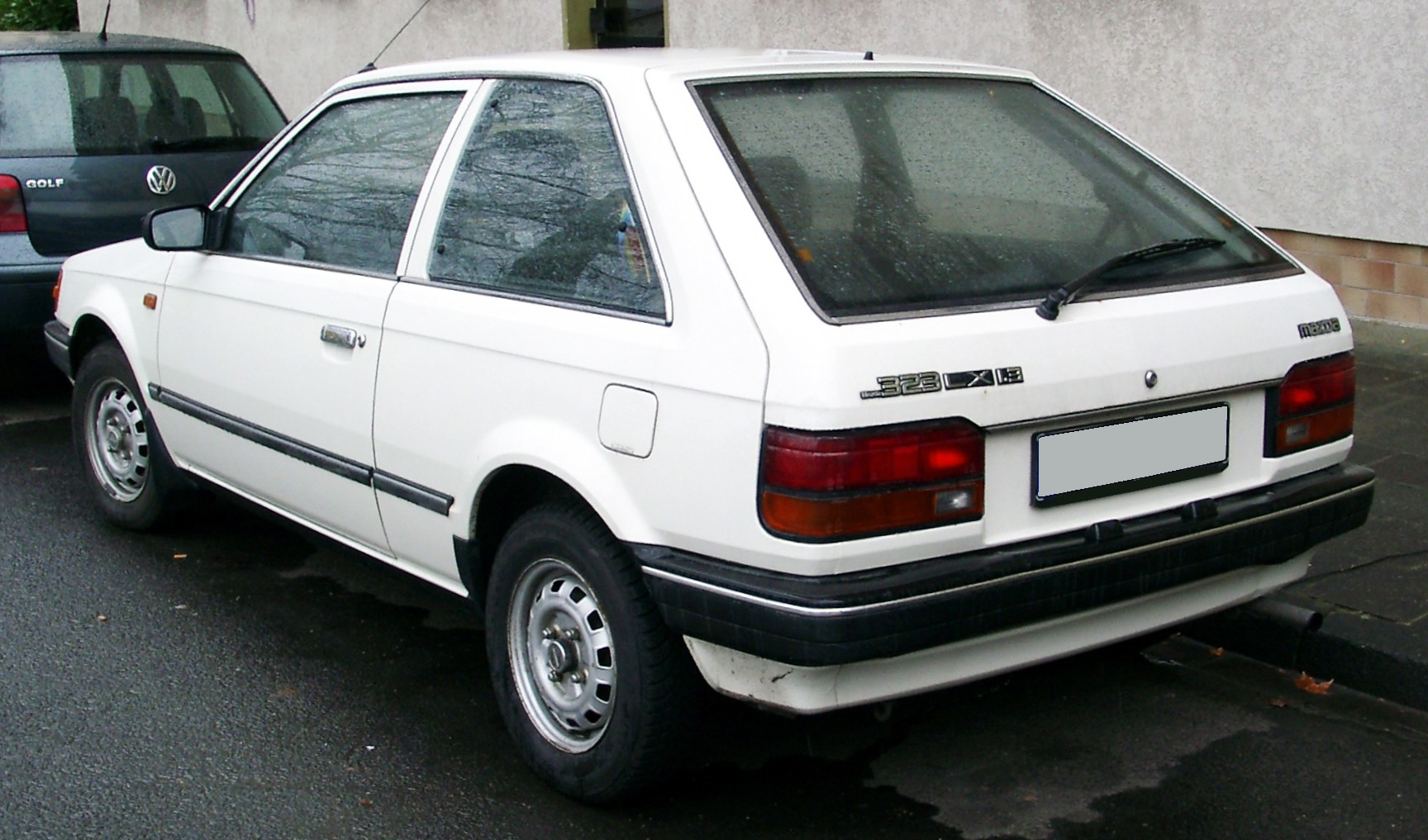
1985–1987 323 3-door hatchback (Europe)

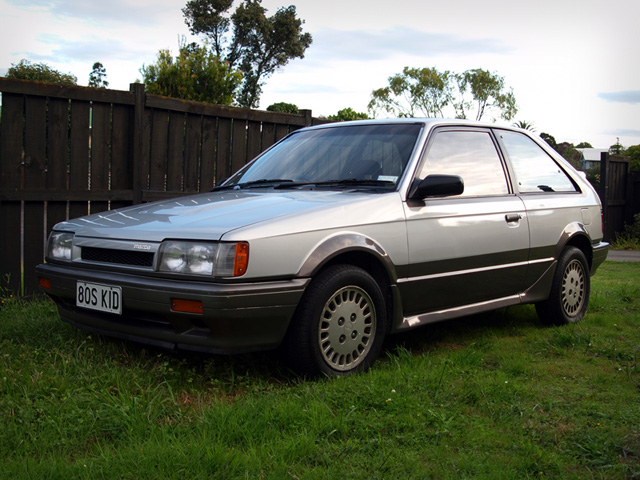
Familia GT-X Turbo AWD (Japanese model imported to New Zealand)

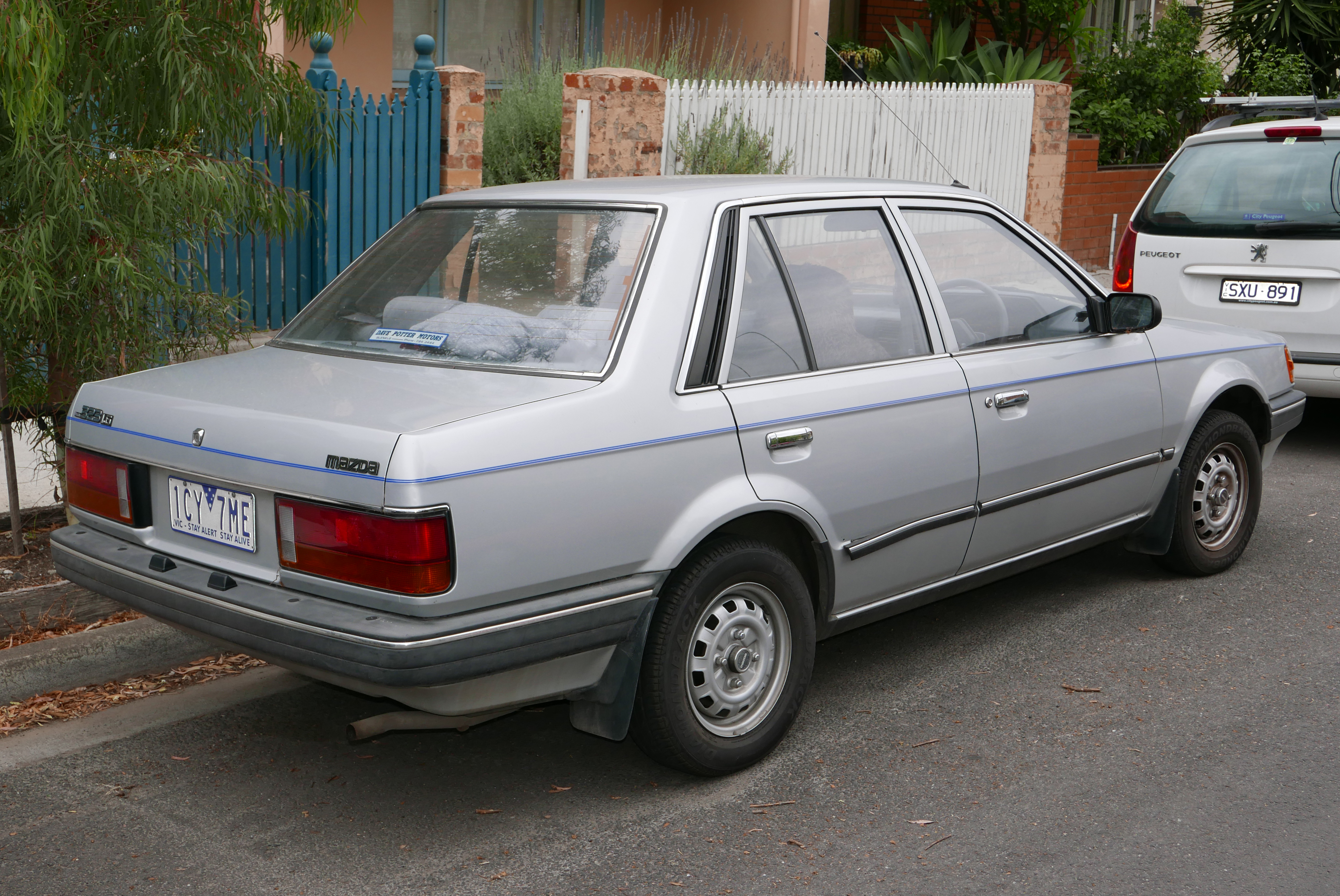
1985–1987 Mazda 323 saloon (Australia)

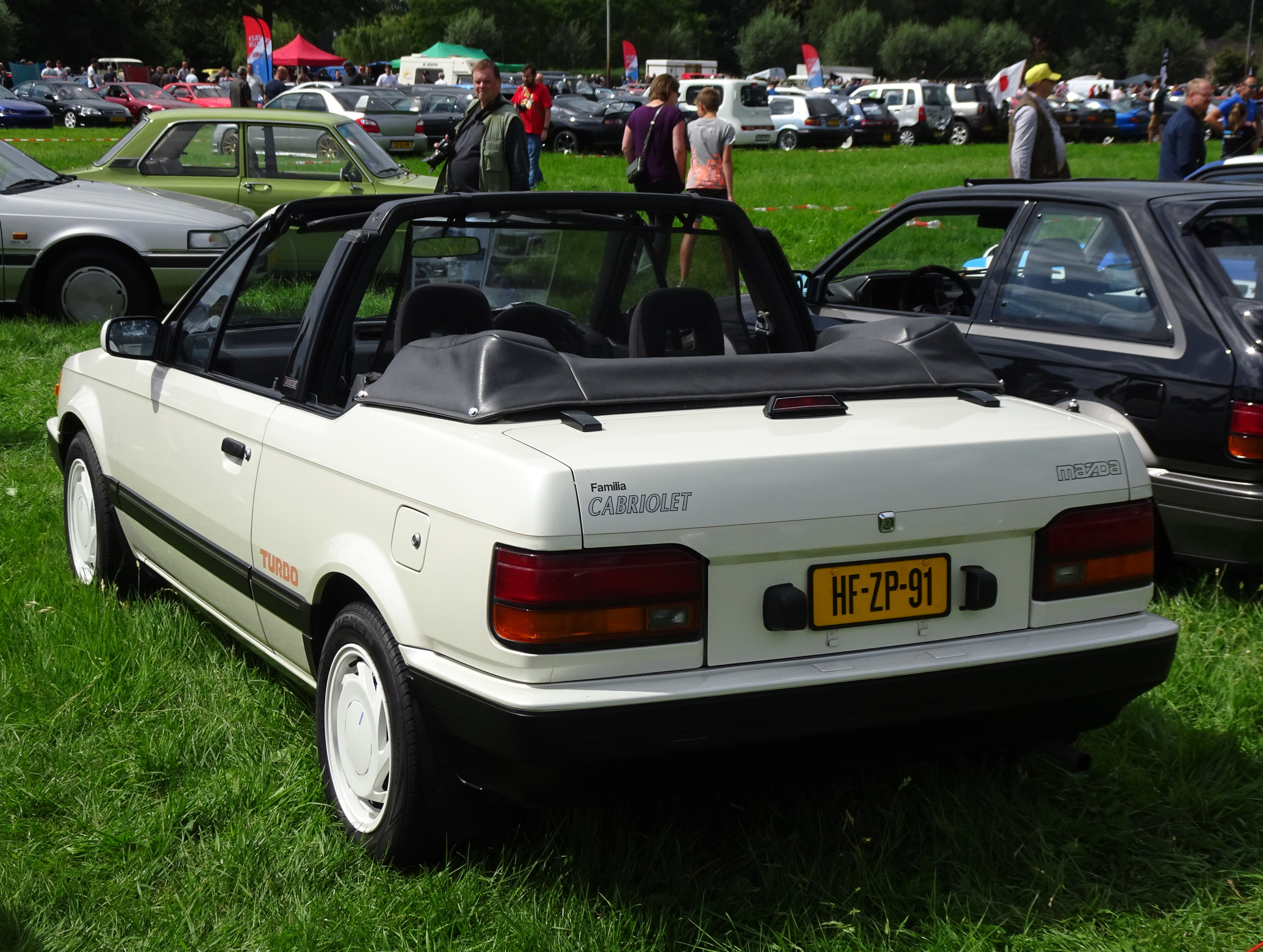
1986–1987 Mazda Familia Cabriolet 1.5 Turbo (Japanese model imported to the Netherlands)

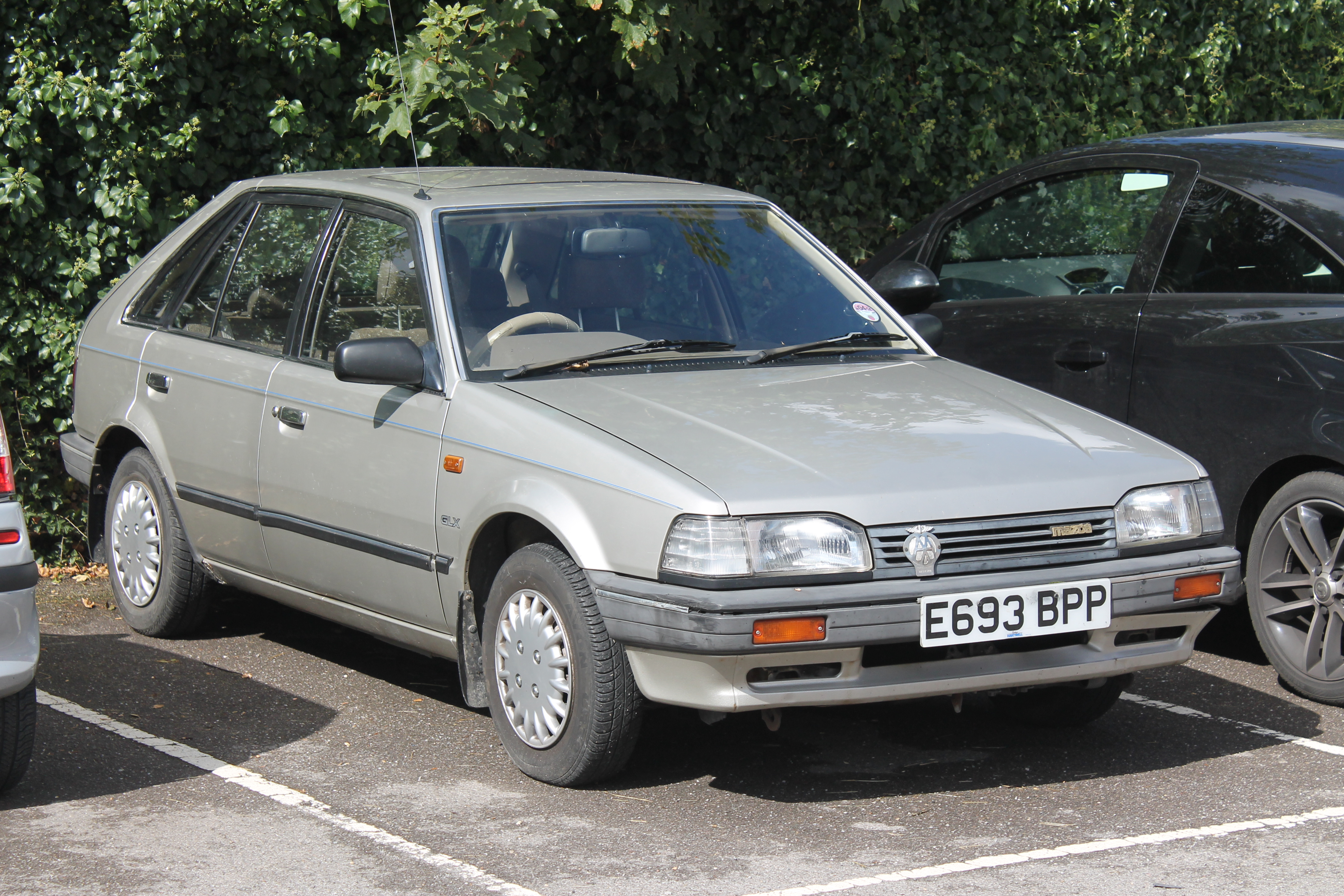
1987–1989 323 5-door hatchback (UK)

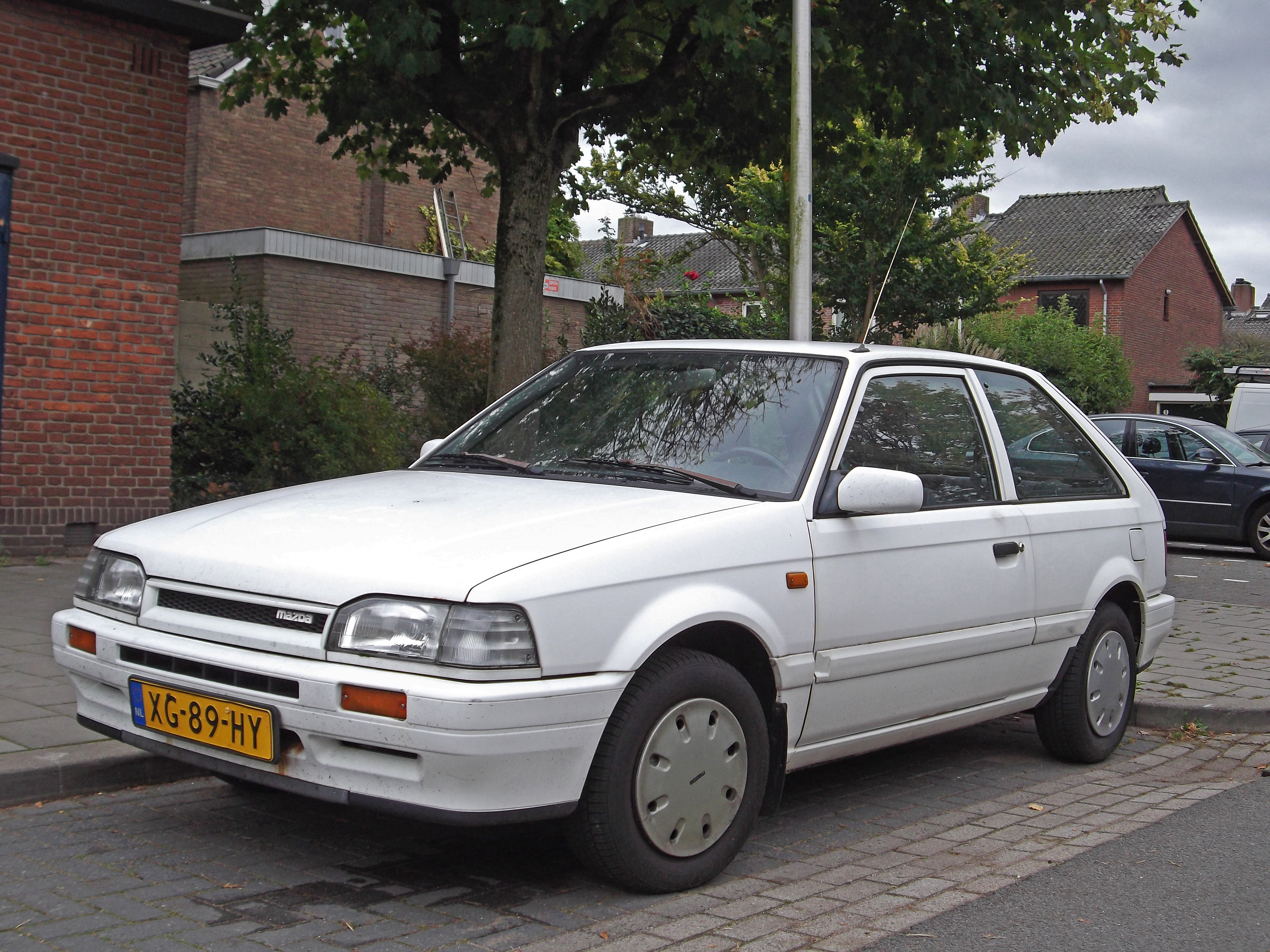
1987–1989 323 3-door hatchback (Europe)
Note: this front end is standard for GT models, but also used for special editions or as facelift in several markets

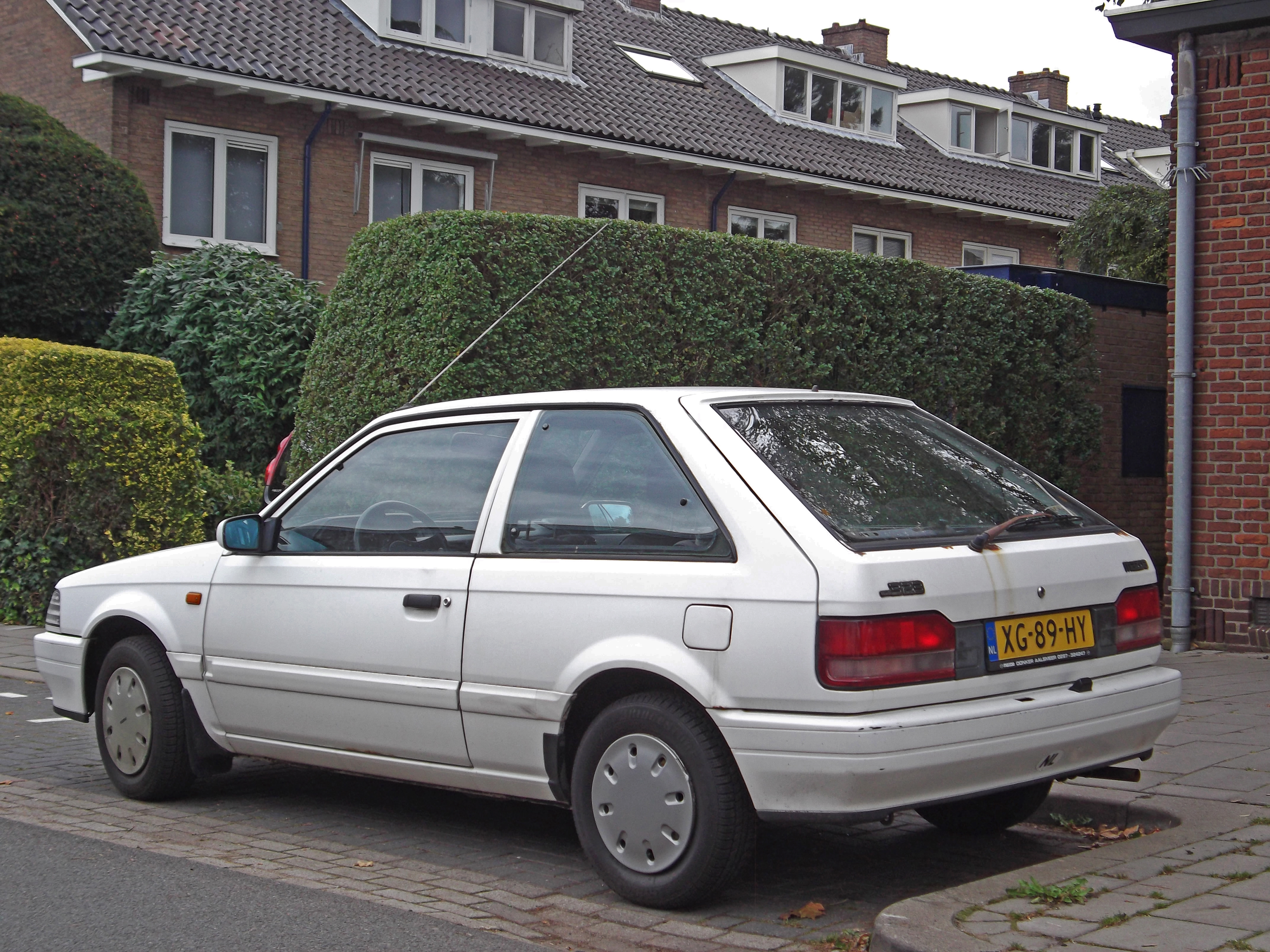
1987–1989 323 3-door hatchback (Europe)

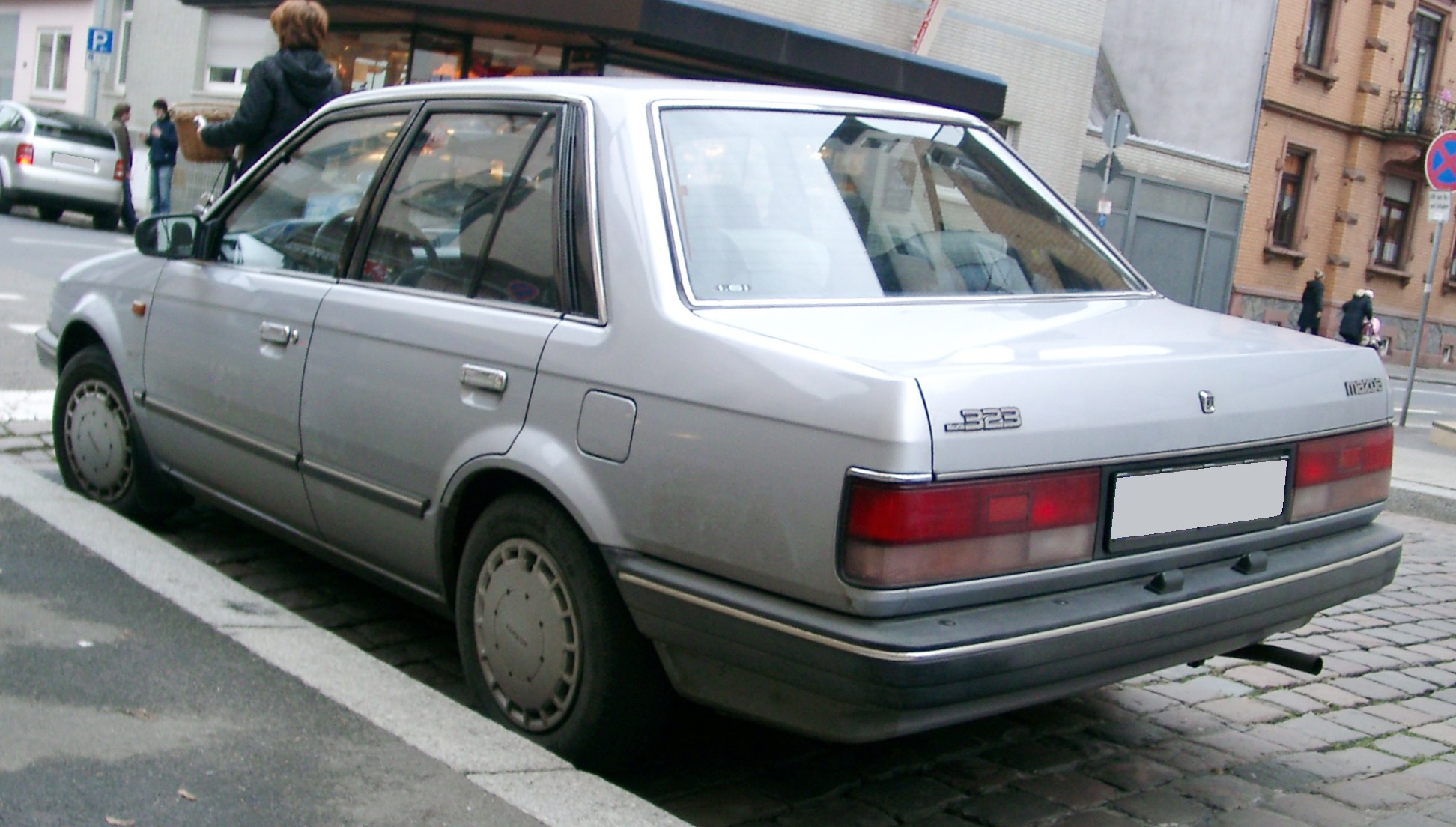
1987–1989 323 saloon (Europe)

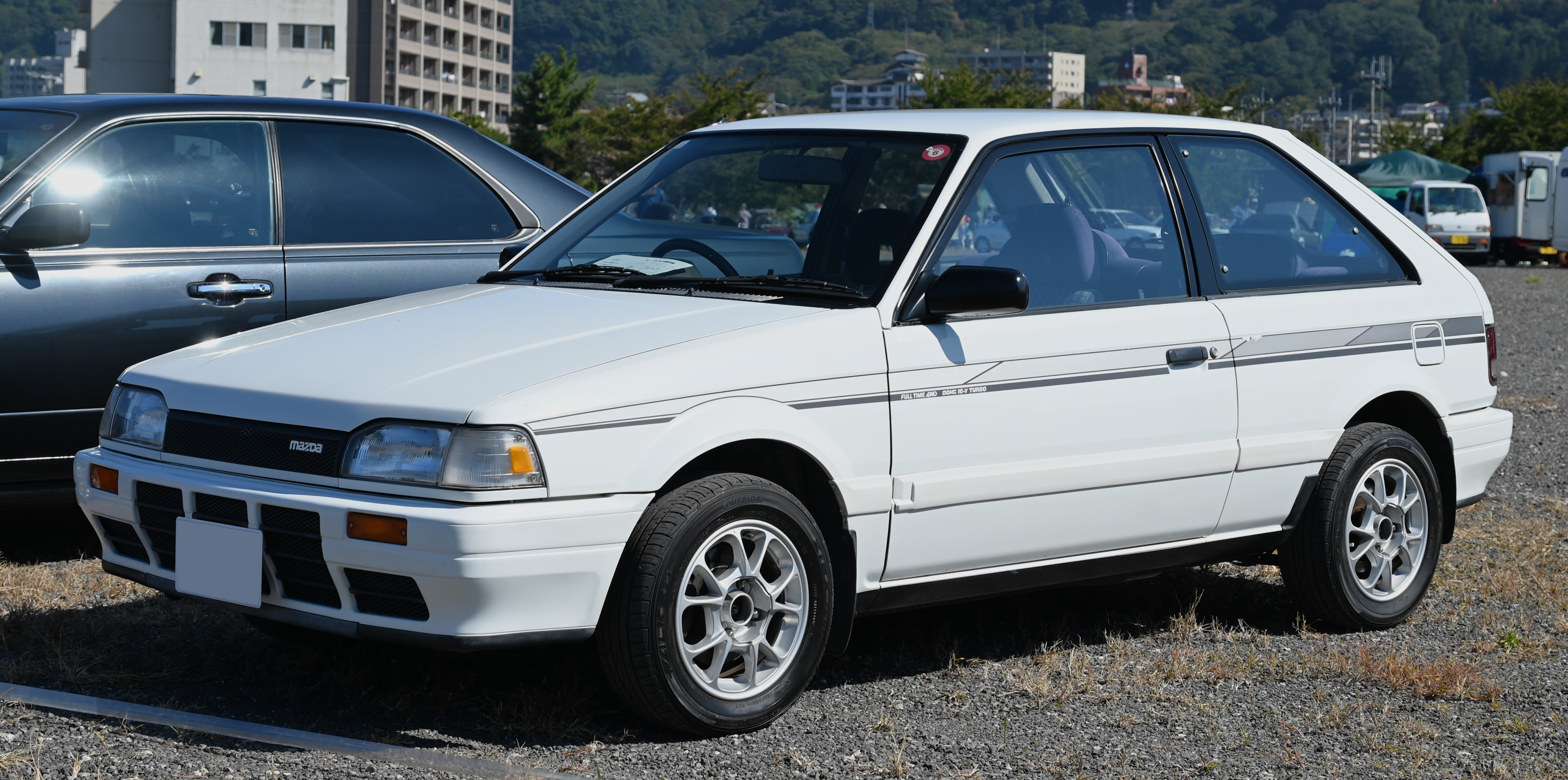
1988–1989 Familia GT-Ae 3-door hatchback (Japan)

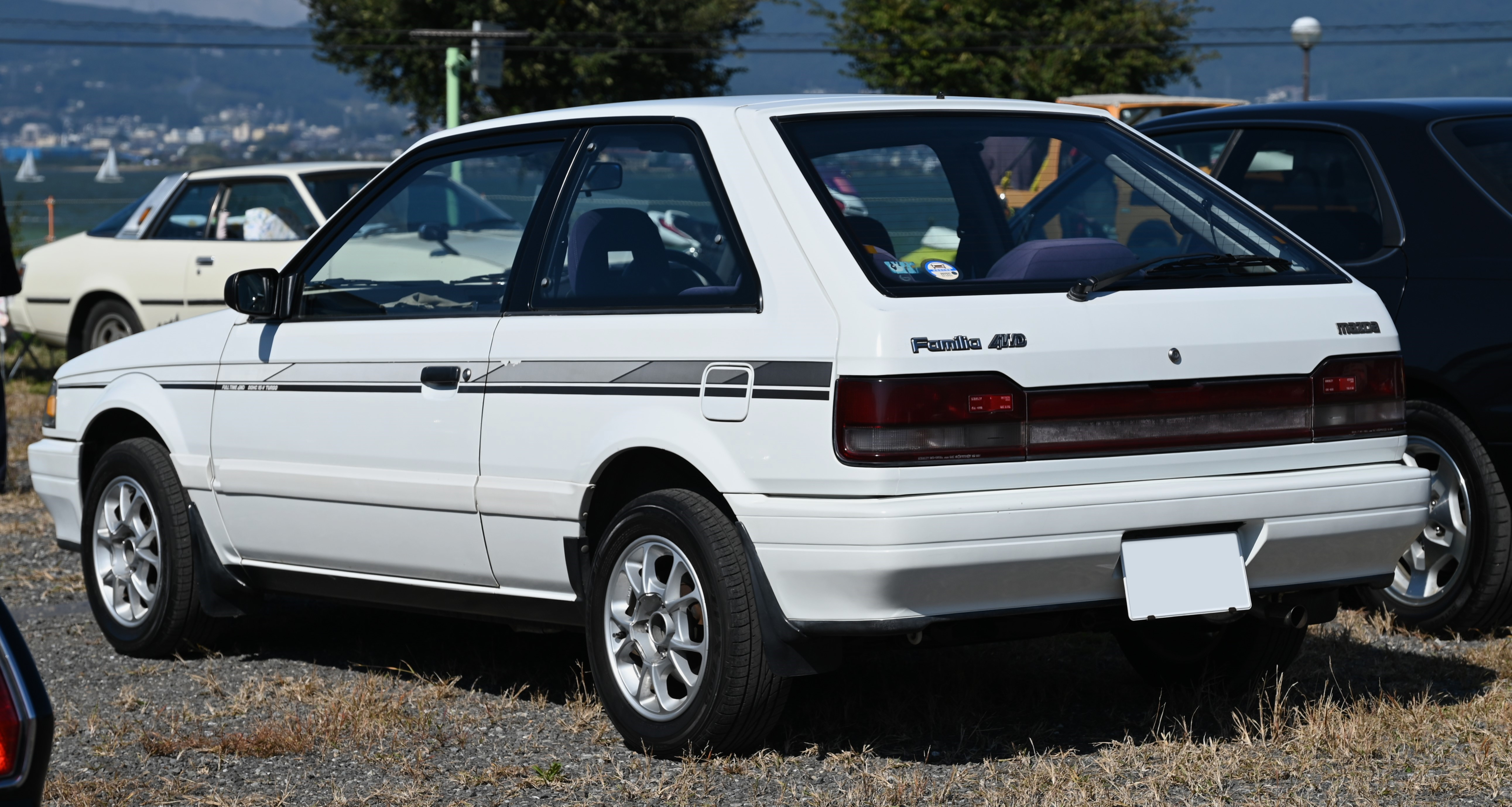
1988–1989 Familia GT-Ae 3-door hatchback (Japan)

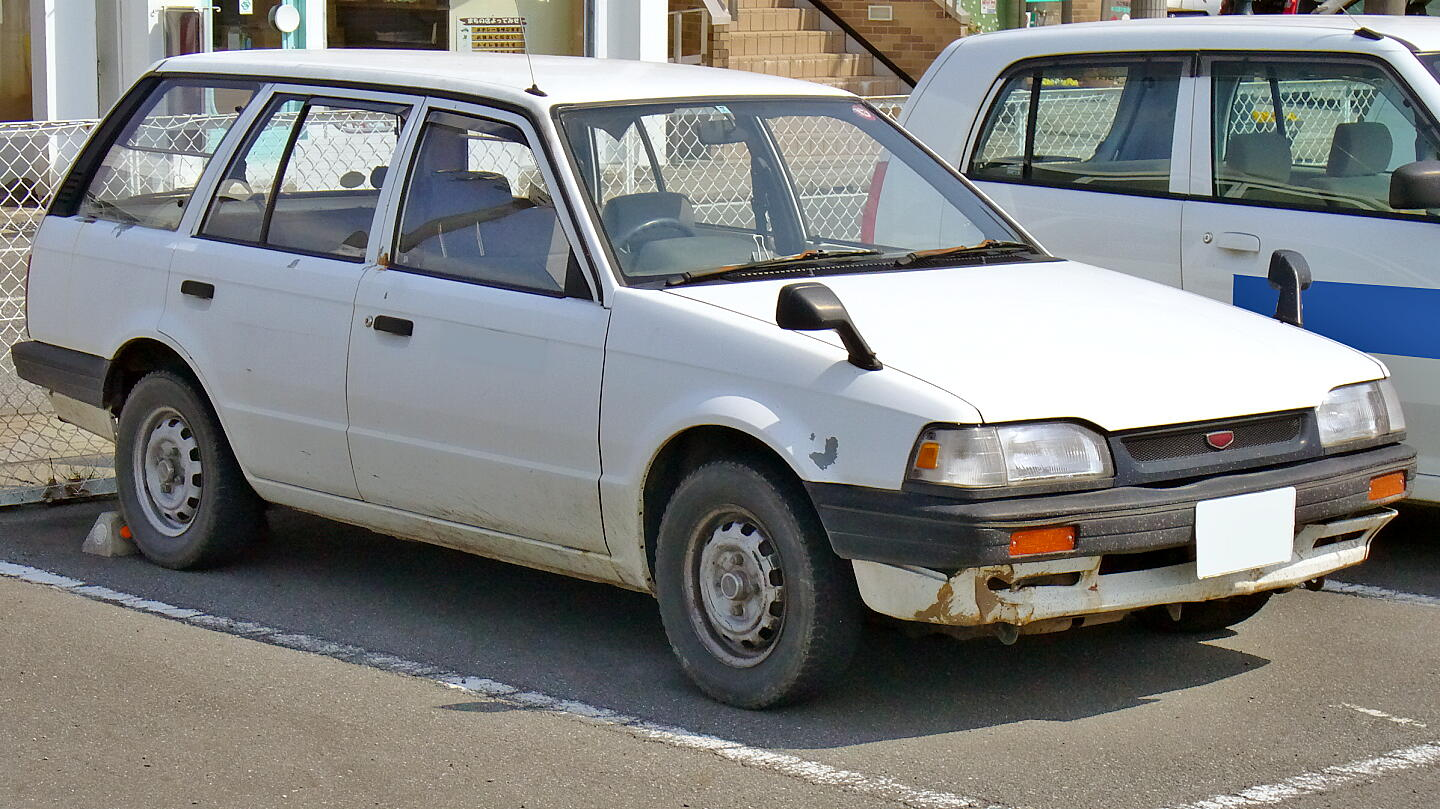
1989–1995 Familia van (Japan)

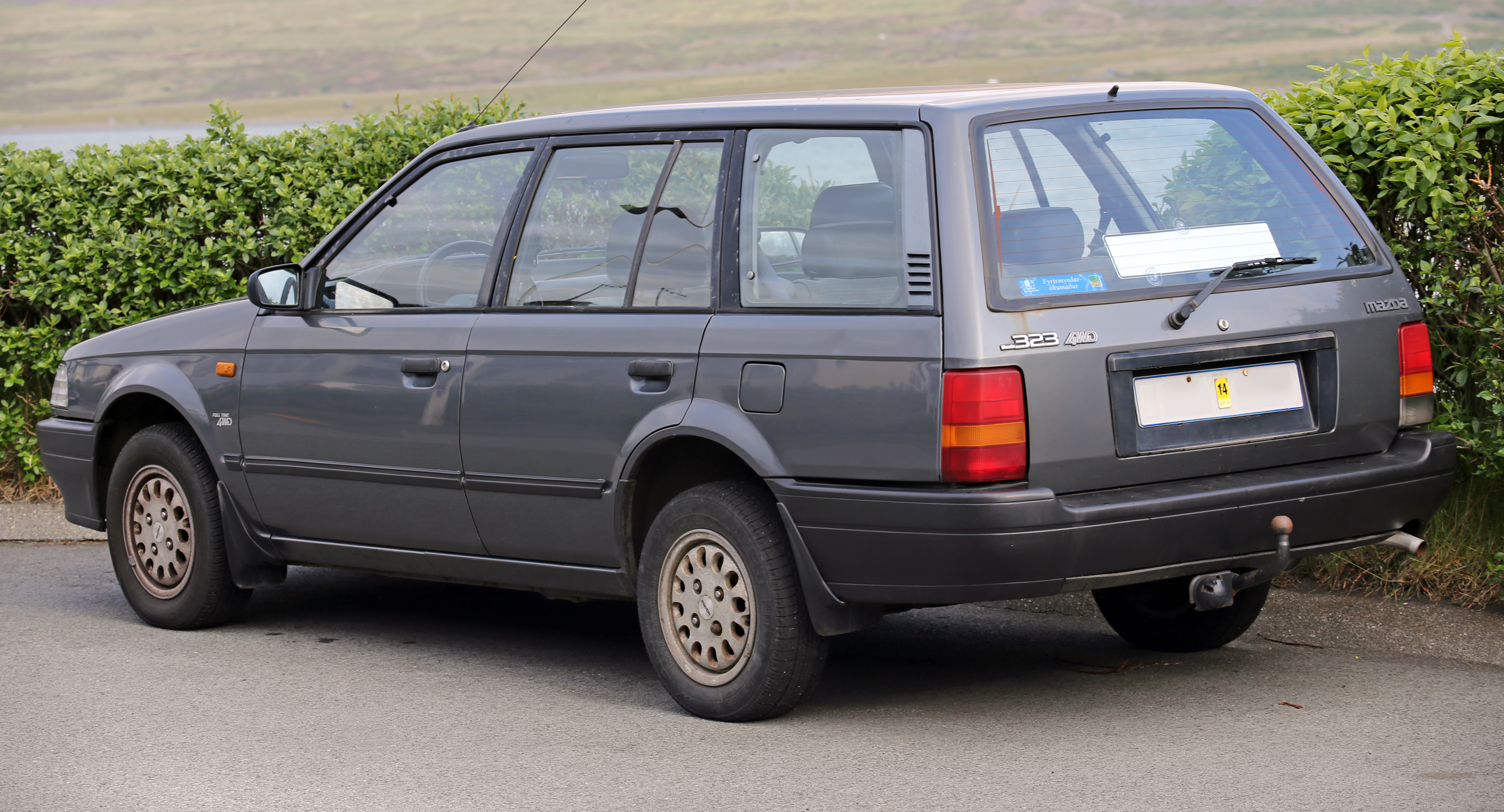
323 station wagon 4WD 1989–1995 (Europe)

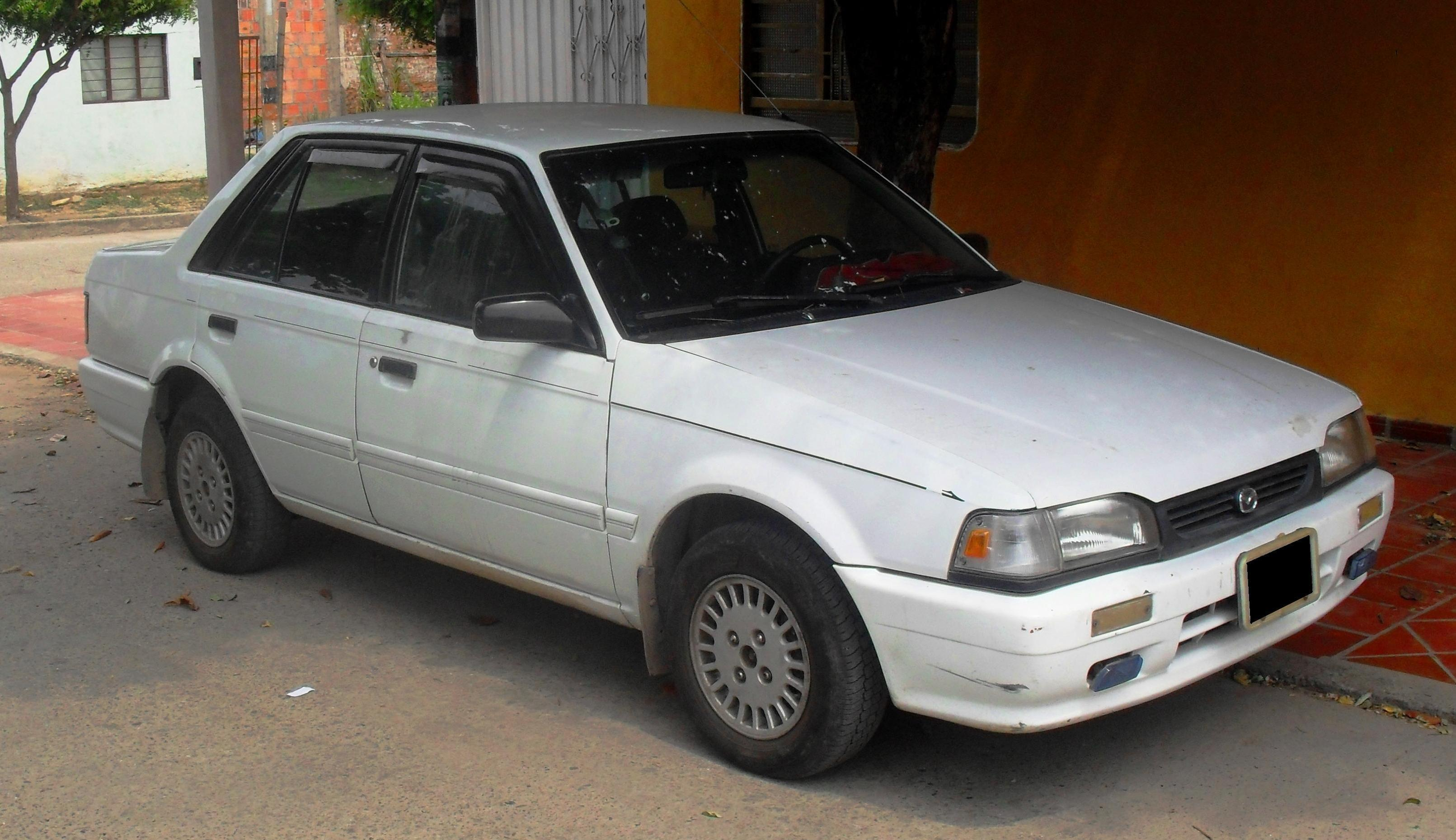
1993–2004 323 saloon (Colombia)

United States

The new 323 arrived in the United States for the 1986 model year and continued to be available through 1989. The naming practice was now aligned with most of Mazda's export markets, with the 323 badge replacing GLC. For 1987 the wagon version was added to the lineup, with the same mechanicals as the hatchbacks and saloons. In 1988, Mazda added a turbocharged option in the GT and GTX model as well as four-wheel drive in the GTX model. The GTX was the first four-wheel drive passenger car Mazda offered in the United States. The GT and GTX featured a turbocharged and intercooled 1.6 liter 16-valve DOHC 4-cylinder engine rated at 132 hp (98 kW) and only was available with a 5-speed manual transmission.

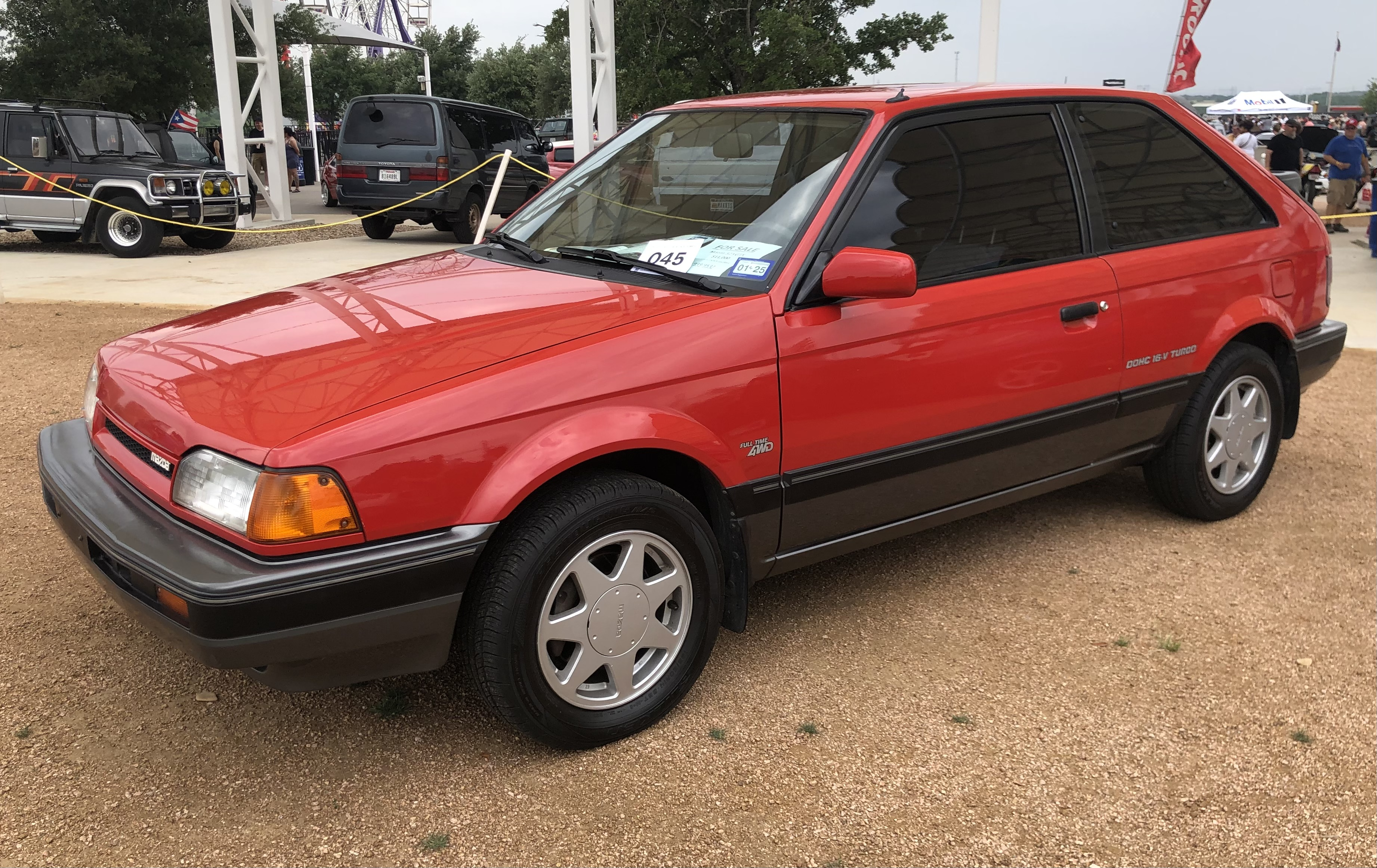
323 GTX Turbo hatchback

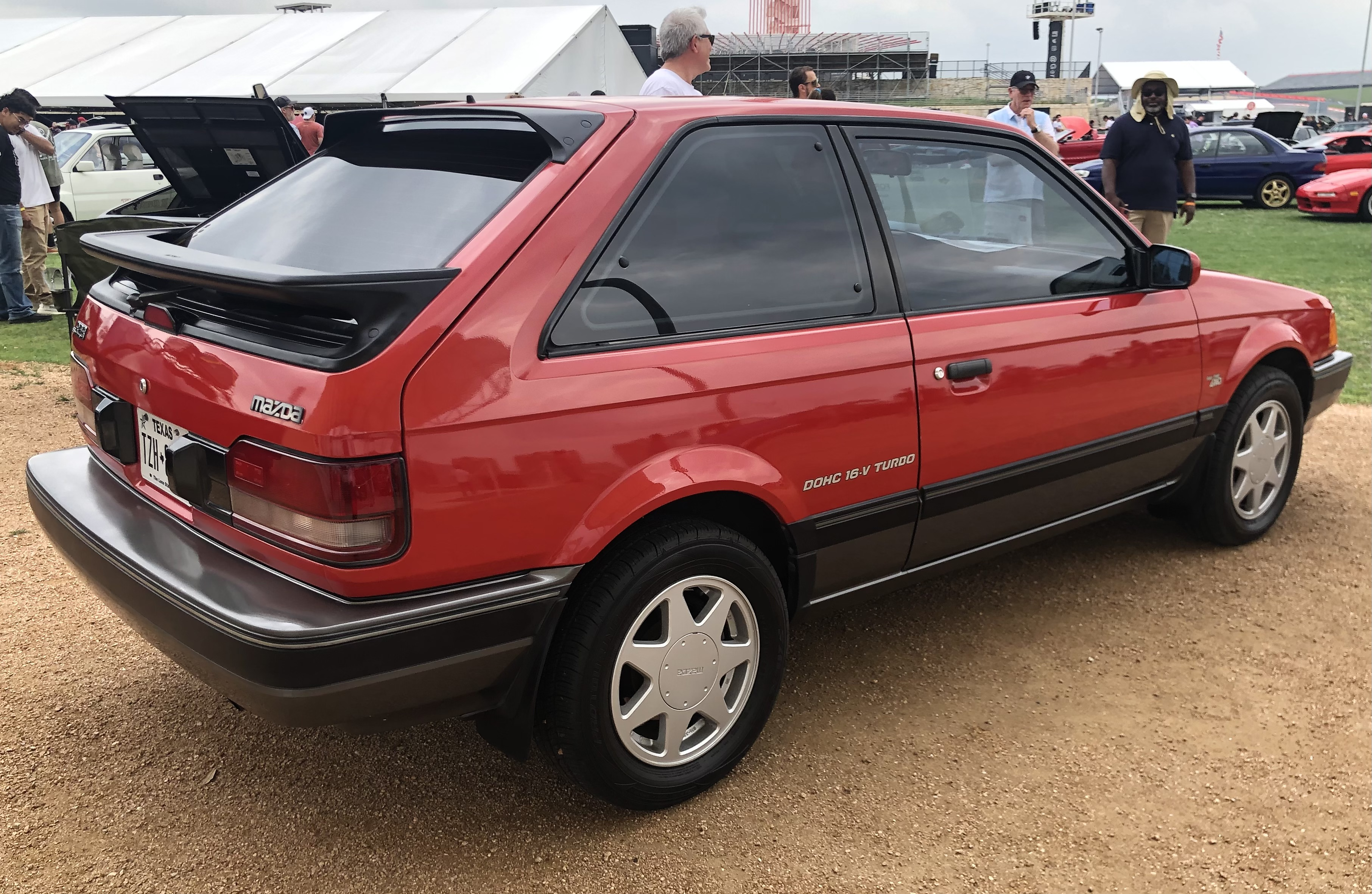
323 GTX Turbo hatchback

South Africa

The model remained in production in South Africa, as an entry-level model until 2003. It was also sold there as the "Midge", the "Sting", and as the "Ford Tonic". A locally designed pickup based on the Familia front end, called the Rustler was also produced, and sold as the "Ford Bantam". From 1991 to 1994 Samcor also produced and sold the 323 with the 2.0 L 16-valve DOHC FE engine from the Mazda 626 and badged it "200i". Along with the 2.0 L 16-valve DOHC engine there were upgrades to the suspension and braking system. Still, the 1.6-litre GT-Ae homologation car was more powerful.

This South African built model was also sold in Australia between 1989 and 1991 with minor changes, the most noticeable one being the front indicators having a clear color rather than the normal amber. These models were labeled BF as opposed to the next generation's BG.

=== Sao Penza ===
The South African-made model was exported to the United Kingdom between 1991 and 1993 as the "Sao Penza" and fitted with a 1.3-litre fuel-injected engine. The importer was Automotive Holdings, a subsidiary of Mazda Cars Ltd, the official Mazda UK importer. It was a rebadged version of the Mazda 323, imported from South Africa, where the 1985 model was still assembled by Samcor (now Ford Motor Company of South Africa), although it had ceased to be imported to the UK in 1989. Both four-door saloon and five-door hatchback versions were available, with fairly basic specifications.

It went on sale in the United Kingdom in June 1991, with around 1,200 vehicles expected to be sold within six months. Marketed as "Japanese technology you can afford", it was sold at just over £7,500 – around £2,000 cheaper than the equivalent version of the new Mazda 323. However, it struggled to compete in a segment of the market dominated by South Korean and Eastern European models. Its prices, which were reduced in early 1992, were not low enough to attract strong sales and it was withdrawn from sale in 1993. Just over 1,000 were sold and by 2019, DVLA records showed that there was just one example remaining in use (a blue 1.3L 5-door)

The car uses the 1.3 L (1,324 cc) Mazda B3 four-cylinder engine. Maximum power is 65 hp (48 kW) at 5500 rpm, providing a top speed of 150 km/h (93 mph).

== Seventh generation (BG; 1989) ==
Seventh generation (BG)
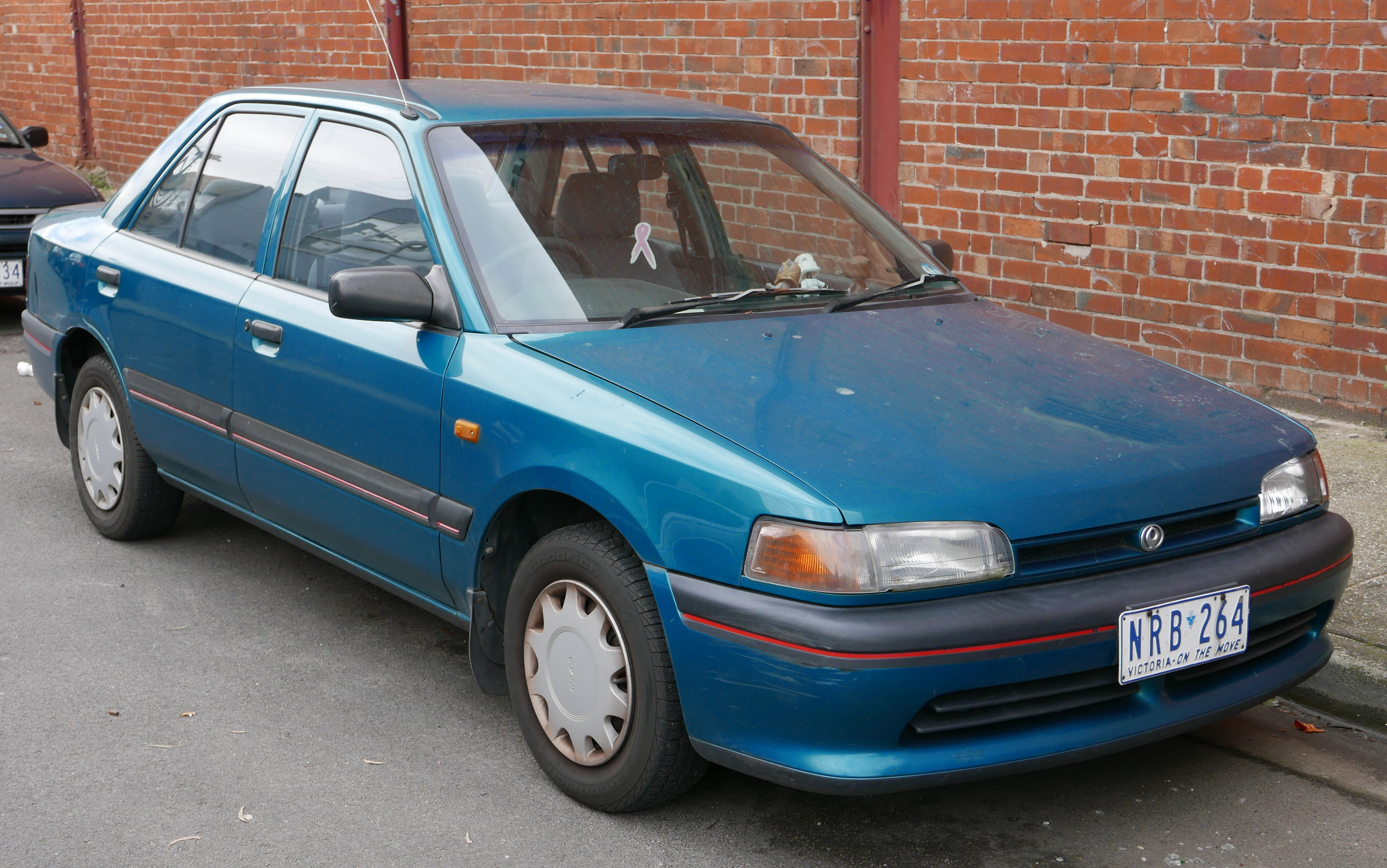
- 1991–1994 Mazda 323 saloon

Overview
- Model code: BG
- Also called: Mazda 323; Mazda Protegé; Eunos 100; Haima CA7130/CA7160; Haima HMC6430/HMC7130; Hainan Beihai GH7160
- Production: 1989–1996 (Japan); 1989–1997 (Indonesia); 1994–2004 (China)
- Assembly: Japan: Hōfu; Philippines: Parañaque (Columbian Autocar Corporation); Thailand: Rayong (AutoAlliance Thailand); China: Hainan and Beihai (Haima); Indonesia: Jakarta (PT National Motors); New Zealand: Wiri (Vehicle Assemblers of New Zealand); South Africa: Silverton, Pretoria (Samcor)
- Designer: Norihiko Kawaoka (1987)

Body and chassis
- Body style: 3-door hatchback; 4-door saloon; 5-door liftback
- Layout: Front-engine, front-wheel-drive; Front-engine, all-wheel-drive
- Platform: Mazda BG platform
- Related: Ford Laser; Ford Escort; Mercury Tracer

Powertrain
- Engine: Petrol: 1.3 L B3 SOHC I4; 1.3 L 8A-FE DOHC I4 (China); 1.5 L B5 DOHC/SOHC I4; 1.6 L B6 DOHC/SOHC I4; 1.8 L B8 SOHC I4; 1.8 L BP-ZE DOHC I4; 1.8 L BPT DOHC turbo I4 (GT-X); 1.8 L BPD DOHC turbo I4 (GT-R); Diesel: 1.7 L PN SOHC I4
- Transmission: 3-speed automatic; 4-speed automatic; 4-speed manual; 5-speed manual

Dimensions
- Wheelbase: Hatchback: 2,450 mm (96.5 in); Saloon/liftback: 2,500 mm (98.4 in)
- Length: Hatchback: 3,995 mm (157.3 in); 4,030 mm (158.7 in) (GT/GT-X); 4,075 mm (160.4 in) (GT-R); 4,155 mm (163.6 in) (North America); Liftback: 4,260 mm (167.7 in); Saloon: 4,215 mm (165.9 in); 4,250 mm (167.3 in) (GT/GT-X); 4,355 mm (171.5 in) (Supreme/Protegé)
- Width: 1,670–1,690 mm (65.7–66.5 in)
- Height: Hatchback: FWD: 1,380 mm (54.3 in); AWD: 1,390–1,405 mm (54.7–55.3 in); Liftback: 1,335 mm (52.6 in); Saloon: FWD: 1,375 mm (54.1 in); AWD: 1,400 mm (55.1 in)
- Curb weight: Hatchback: FWD: 910–1,045 kg (2,006.2–2,303.8 lb); AWD: 1,060–1,210 kg (2,336.9–2,667.6 lb); Liftback: 970–1,100 kg (2,138.5–2,425.1 lb); Saloon: FWD: 930–1,128 kg (2,050.3–2,486.8 lb); AWD: 1,080–1,200 kg (2,381.0–2,645.5 lb)

The seventh generation Familia (BG) included three-door hatchback, five-door liftback, and four-door saloon variants, none of which share any body panels. The new five-door liftback version was called the Familia Astina in Japan and was sold as the 323F or 323 Astina elsewhere. The BF wagon (originally introduced in 1985) was carried over in facelifted form, although Ford marketed a wagon on the new platform as part of the North American Escort line.

The BG Familia was available with front- or all-wheel drive and 1.3–1.8 L petrol engines or a 1.7 L diesel engine. Later, a turbocharged engine was added, especially developed for homologation purposes for the World Rally Championship (WRC), Group A category. The all-wheel drive models (including the turbocharged GT-X) were introduced in August 1989. In Japan, the 1.6 L SOHC was only available coupled to all-wheel drive. With a carburettor, it offered 91 PS (67 kW; 90 hp), the same as the lower-spec 1.5 L SOHC, but with a somewhat larger torque curve. In Europe, only the 1.8 L SOHC (in naturally aspirated, 106 PS (78 kW; 105 hp) form or either of the turbocharged variants) was offered with four-wheel-drive.

Trim lines in Japan included "Clair", "Pepper", "Interplay", "Supreme", "GT", "GT-X" and "GT-R". The Supreme model was only available in saloon form and features the larger bumpers and bootlid-mounted number plate recess of the American market Protegé. Carburetted models were mostly dropped in the 1991 facelift, replaced by single-point fuel injection.

In North America, the 323 saloon became the Protegé, while the 323 hatchback kept its name. There, and in the Philippines, base (SE/DX), 4WD and top-line LX models were available. The 1990 base model has the SE name and uses the B8 1.8 L SOHC engine that has 16 valves and hydraulic lifters. In 1991, the base model name was changed to "DX". 4WD models existed for the 1990 and 1991 model years, with the SOHC engine and rear disc brakes. The LX version of the Protegé included a 1.8 L DOHC 16-valve BP engine producing 125 hp (93 kW; 127 PS). LX models also have power windows and door locks and 14-inch wheels. Vented front and solid rear disc brakes, larger front brakes, larger clutch, equal-length driveshafts, dual outlet muffler, body-color door handles and mirrors, fold-down rear center armrest, driver's vanity mirror, and larger stabilizer bars. A sunroof and 14-inch aluminum alloy wheels were options on LX models. The Protegé nameplate was also applied for 323 saloon in Brazil, which was really similar to the Canadian market specification. However, only a fuel injected 1.8 L SOHC engine was offered there.

BG models that were assembled in New Zealand came with glass headlights instead of plastic, and a 240 km/h speedometer.

In Thailand, the 323 saloon was initially offered in a single unnamed trim with a carbureted 1.6 L SOHC engine as the sole option. The facelifted model was divided into two levels: the 1.3i and 1.6i LX, and the better-equipped 1.6i GLX. All engines featured fuel injection, and the latter came with a 4-speed automatic transmission as an option.

Production of the BG Familia mostly ended on 24 May 1994, although the 1.3 L hatchback was kept in production until October 1996 as there was originally no 1.3 L option in the following generation. In Australia and South America, the BG saloon continued to be sold until 1996 as a more affordable alternative to the newer BH model.

The Indonesian market 323 was assembled locally starting in 1989 and was available only as a saloon. It was sold in a single trim called Interplay, powered by a carbureted 1.6 L SOHC engine mated to a 5-speed manual or a rare 4-speed automatic transmission. Unique to this market, the 323 came standard with a digital speedometer from the Eunos 100, a feature that was optional in Japan. Around late 1994, a special edition called Interplay Executive was introduced featuring the facelifted bumpers and bigger 14-inch steel wheels with hubcaps, but it also loses the digital speedometer. Also a few months later in this year when the newer BH model was introduced, BG model production was extended until 1997, primarily for the taxi fleet market. This fleet version had its premium features removed and an optional 1.3 L engine.

In China, Haima—a joint venture between Hainan Auto Works and Mazda—began manufacturing the BG saloon on the island of Hainan in 1994. The saloon was initially marketed as the HMC6430, powered by a 1.3 L B3 engine. Another model, the GH7160, was released shortly thereafter with a 1.6 L SOHC B6 engine, manufactured at Haima's branch factory in Beihai, Guangxi. Following the buyout of Haima by FAW Group between 1997 and 1998, the saloon was renamed as the CA7130 and CA7160 in 1999. This buyout also helped Haima sell the saloon throughout the country, whereas sales had previously been limited to Hainan and Guangxi. In 2000, the Mazda 1.3–1.6 L B-series engines were replaced by a fuel injected 1.3 L DOHC 8A-FE engine sourced from FAW Toyota. Production ended in 2004 when it was replaced by the BJ Familia-based Haima Family, which had been introduced a year earlier.

=== Familia Infini ===
The Japan only special model Familia Infini was introduced in February 1990 to celebrate Mazda's 70th anniversary. Based on the GT saloon, the 1.6 L DOHC B6-ZE engine was swapped to a bigger 1.8 L DOHC BP-ZE engine from the Protegé LX and international market 323 GT (it later became the standard engine for Familia GT in 1991), and teamed with a close ratio LSD 5-speed manual transmission. The Infini was upgraded with a viscous limited-slip differential, stiffer suspension package, and bonnet/headlight from the 323 hatchbacks (in 1991, these were adopted on all Familia saloon models). The Infini came only in dark green color with unique Infini aerodynamic grille, rear spoiler with third stop lamp, "lightweight" carpet, without sound deadener, and with Infini (∞) logos on horn button, front grille, wheel caps, and bootlid. There were also unique factory front clear indicators, a Momo Cobra II steering wheel, BBS 15-inch rims, faux suede interior with GT-X style seat trim, leather gearknob and shift boot, front and rear strut braces, 22-mm sway bars front and rear, rear tie bar, a quick-ratio steering and a 7,250 rpm redline tachometer, as well as 250 mm (9.8 in) four-wheel disc brakes. Around 1,000 Infinis were produced, and preceded Mazda's ɛ̃fini Japanese dealership network.

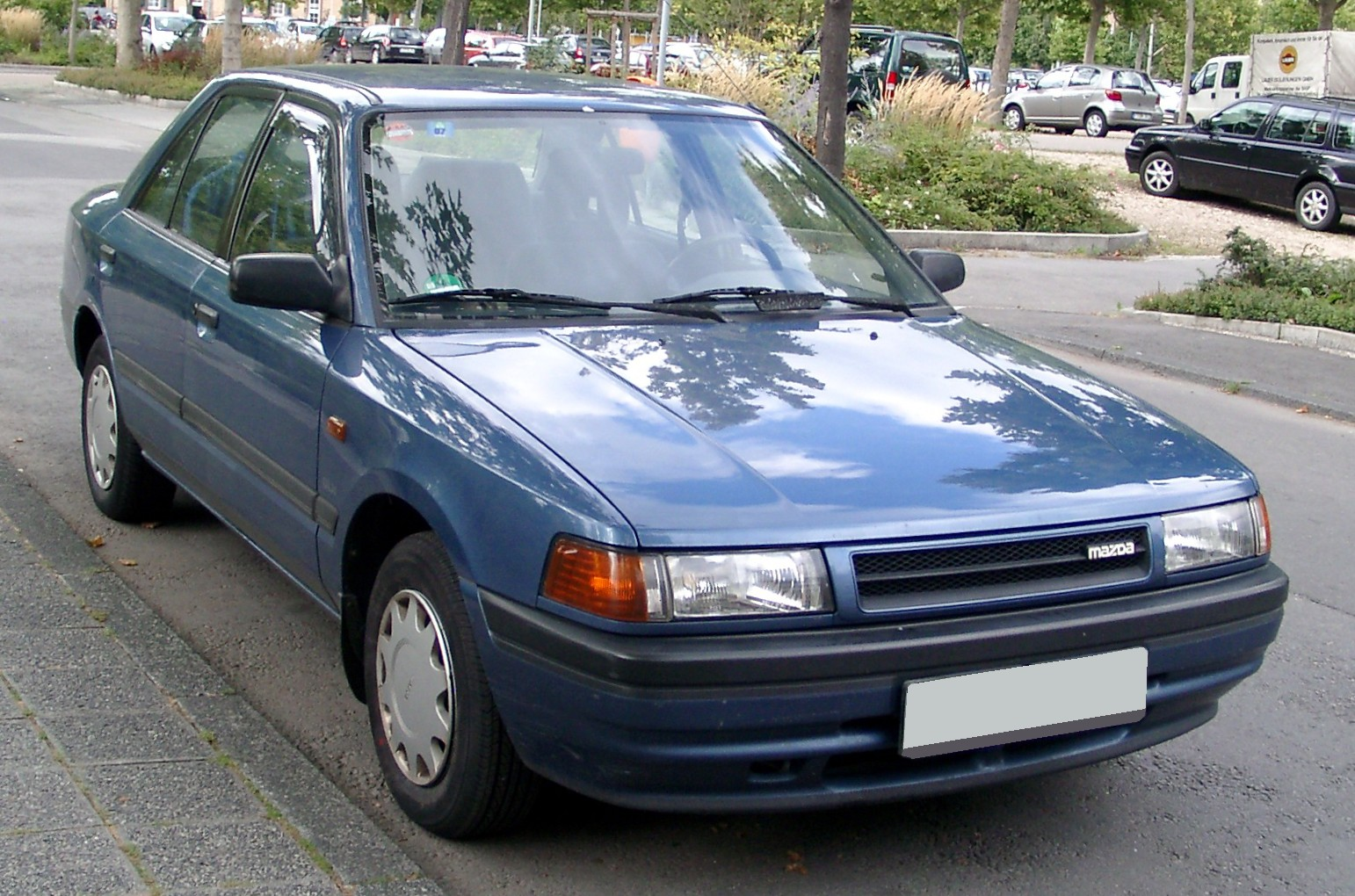
1989–1991 Mazda 323 saloon (Europe)

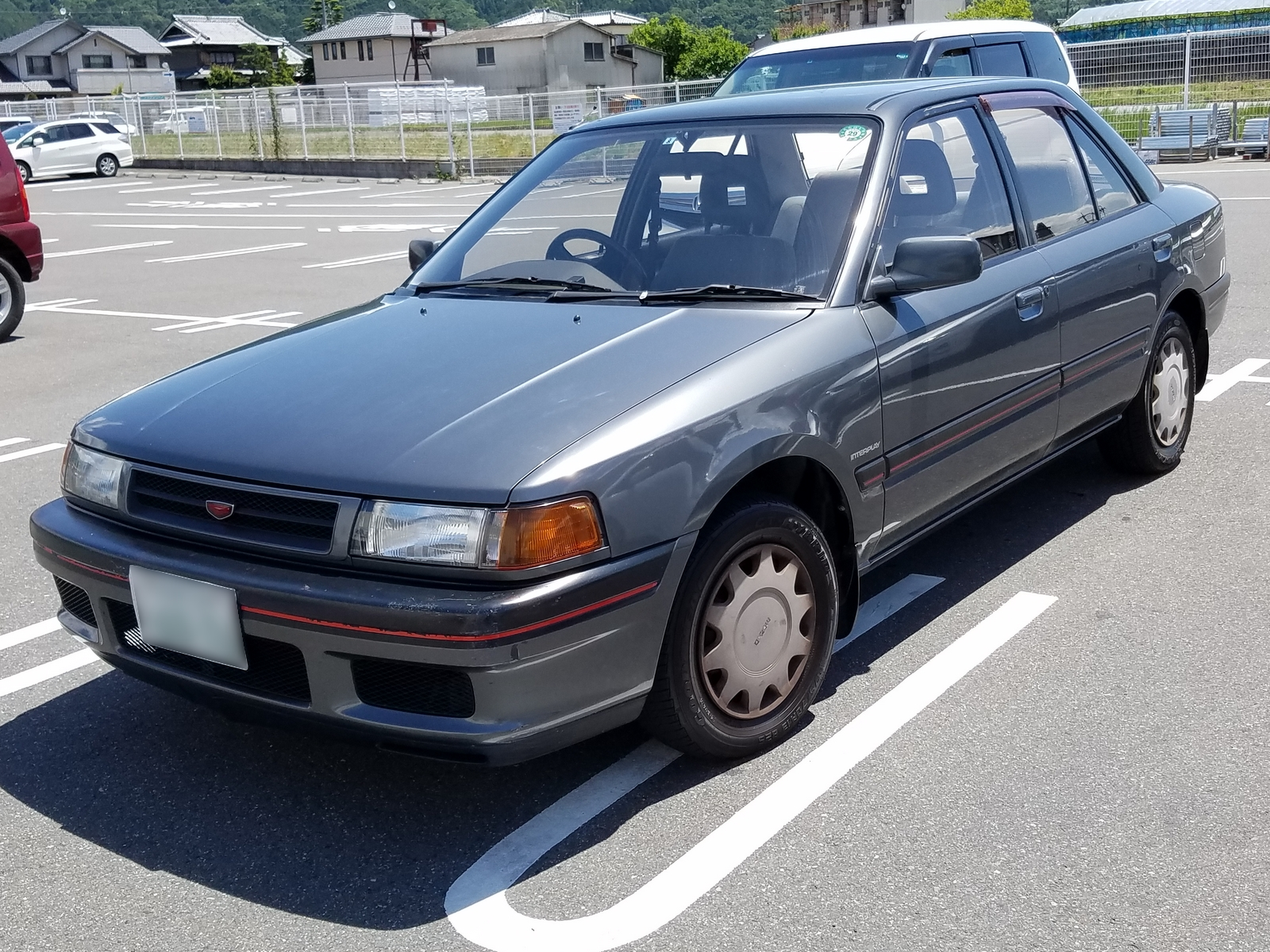
1989–1991 Mazda Familia Interplay saloon (Japan)

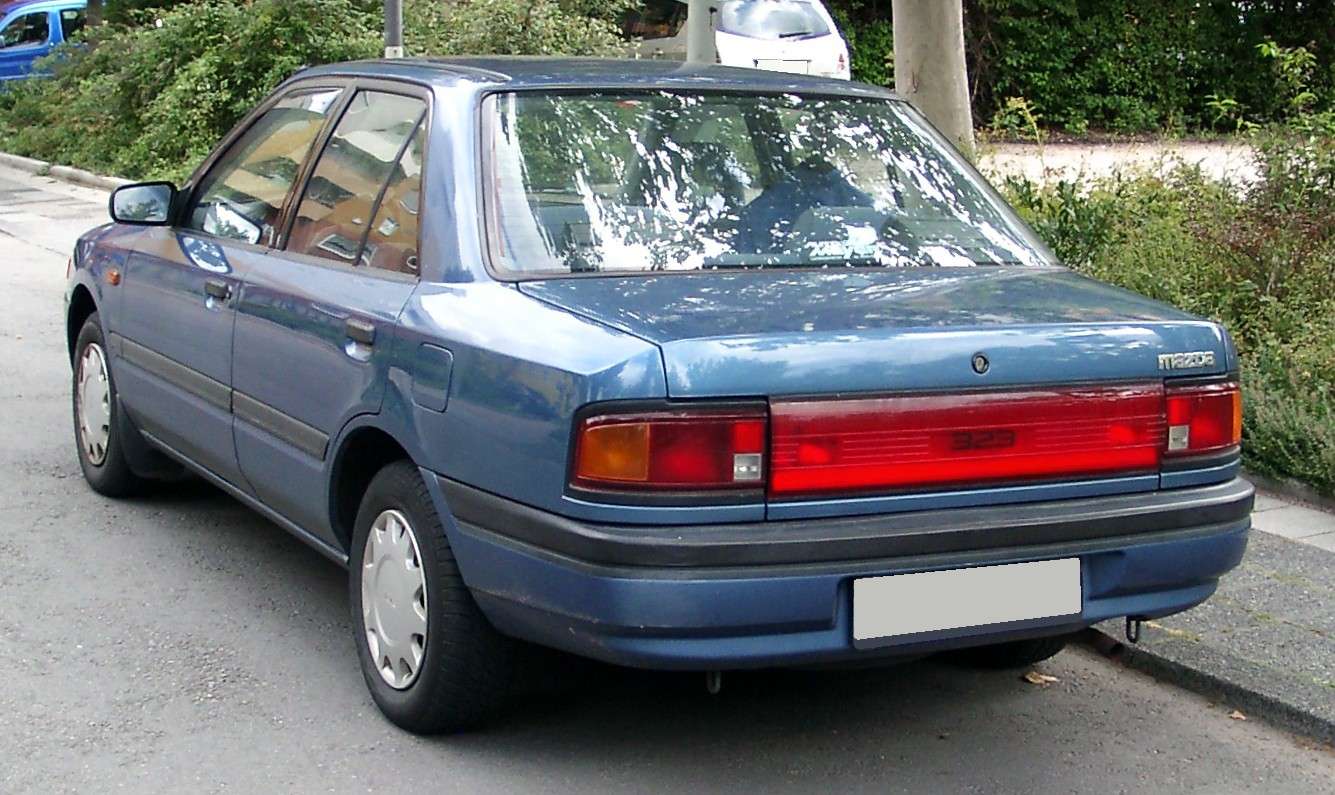
1989–1991 Mazda 323 saloon (Europe)

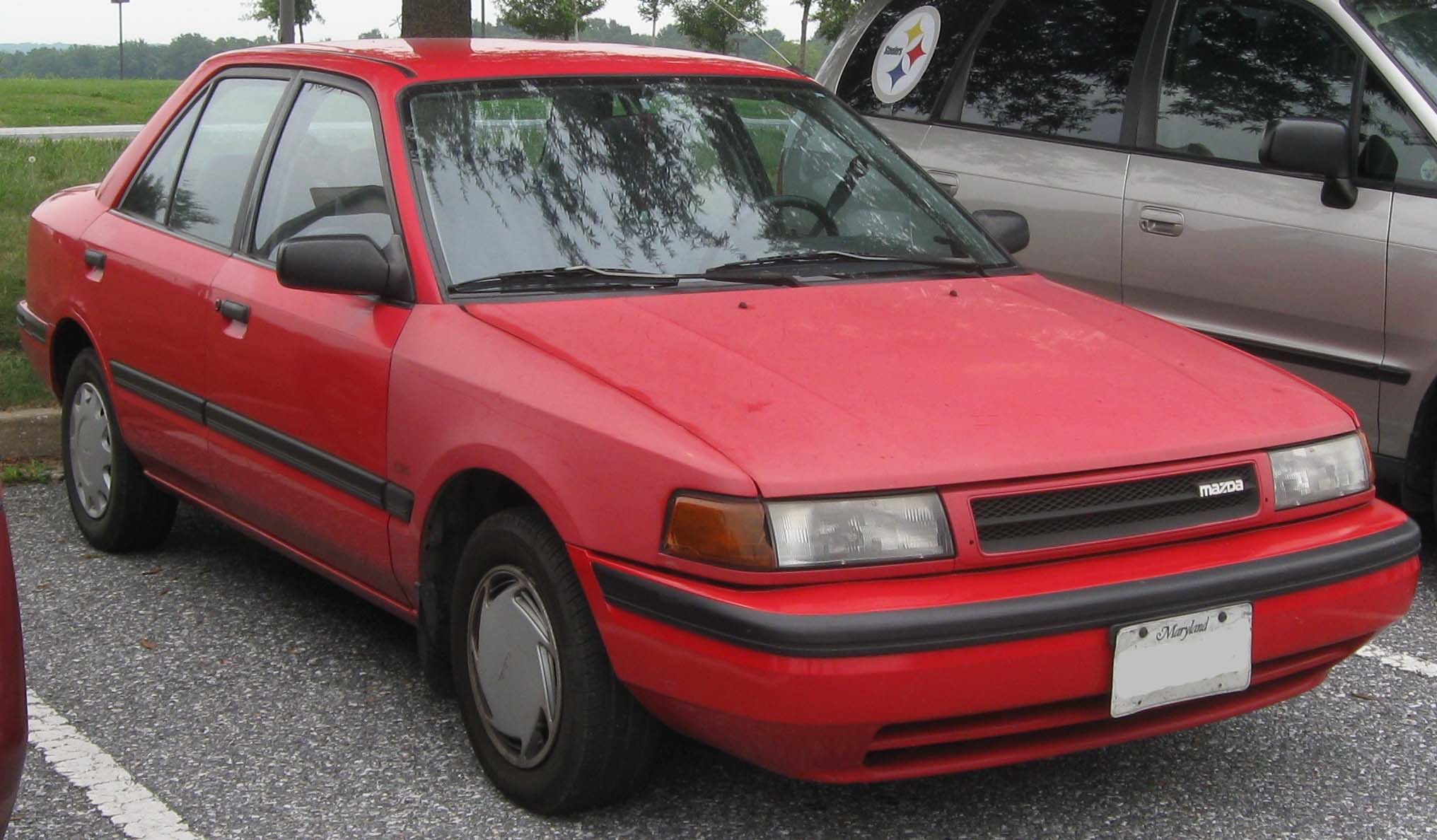
1990–1992 Mazda Protegé (US)

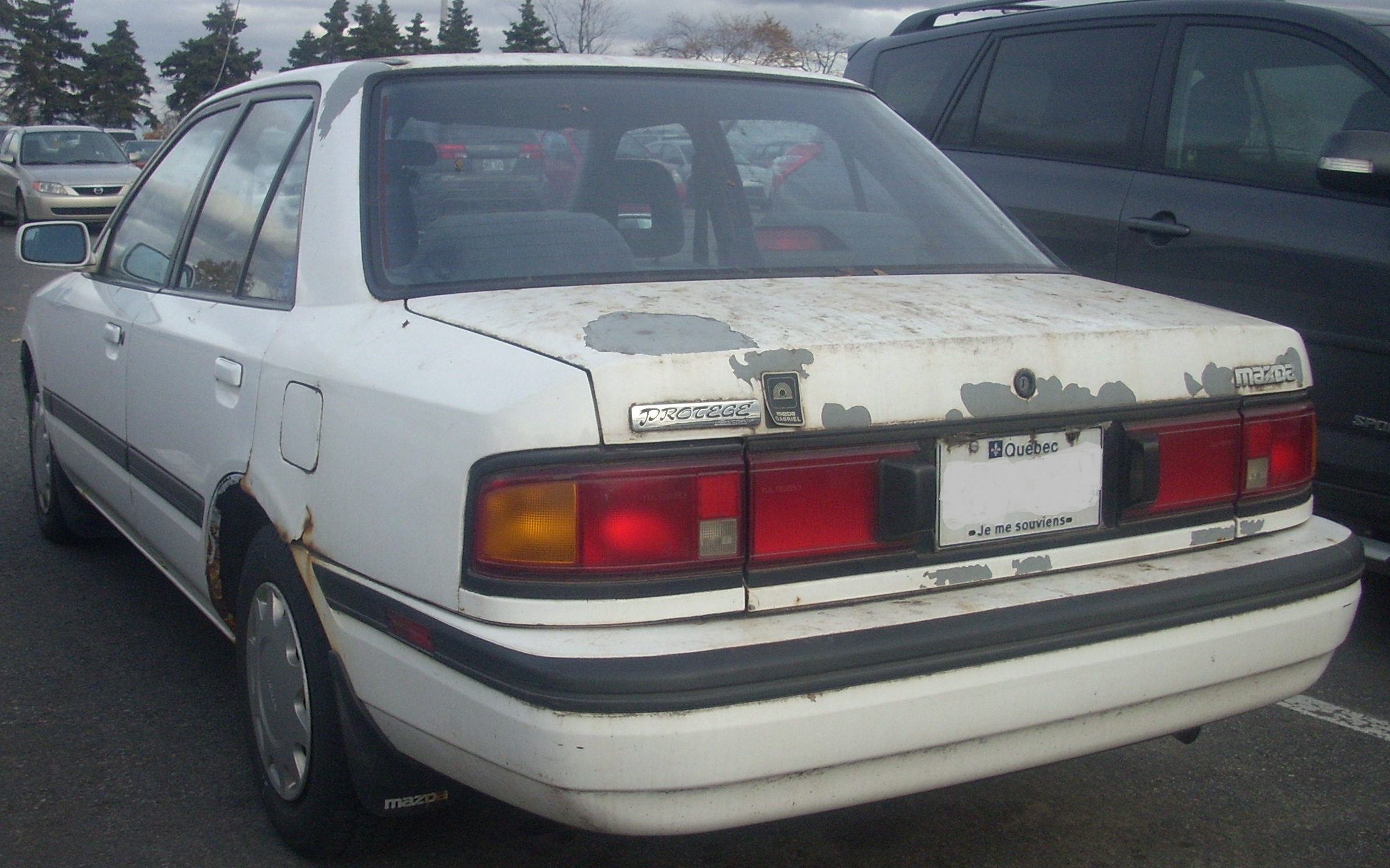
1990–1992 Mazda Protegé (Canada)

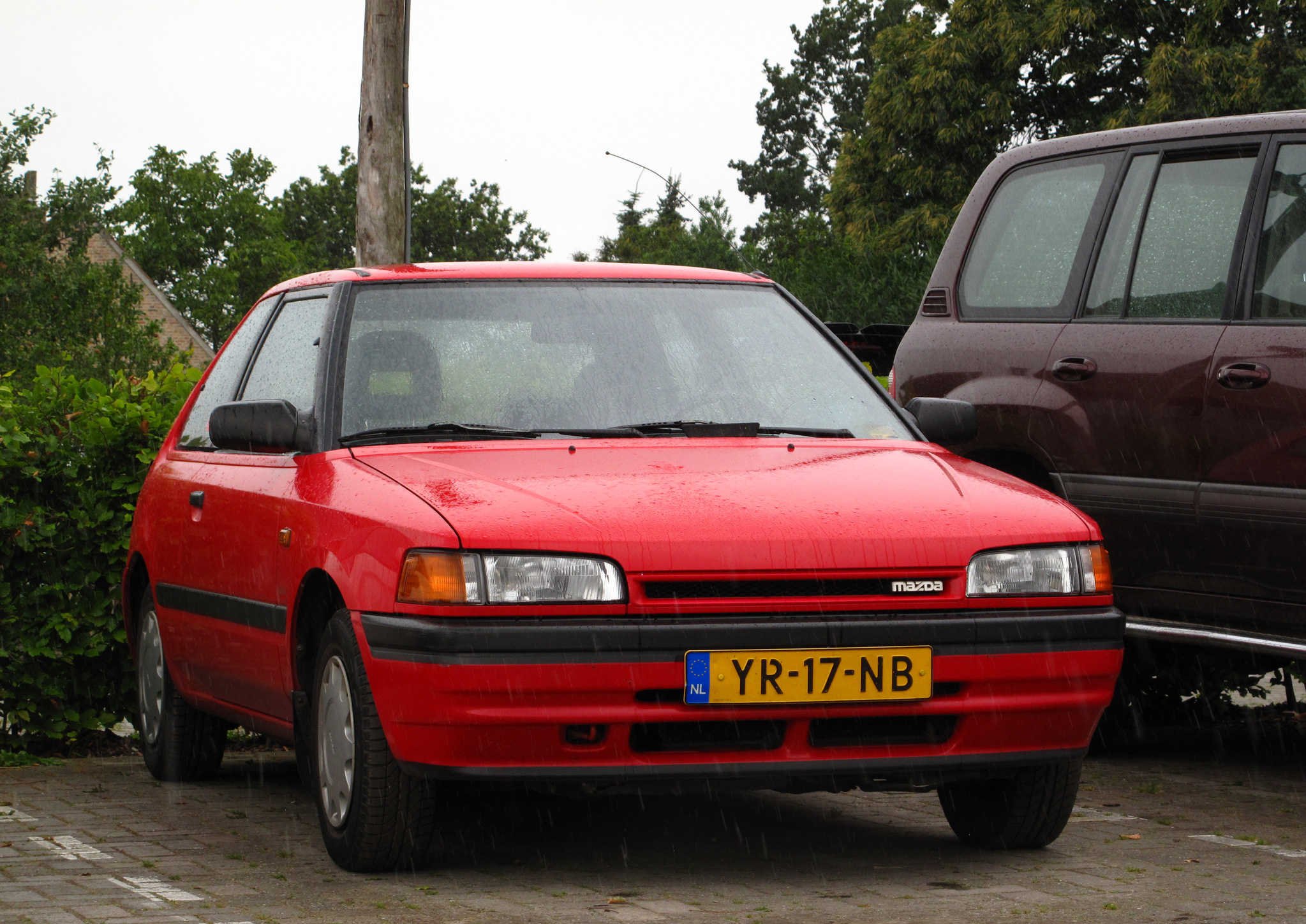
1989–1991 Mazda 323 hatchback (Europe)

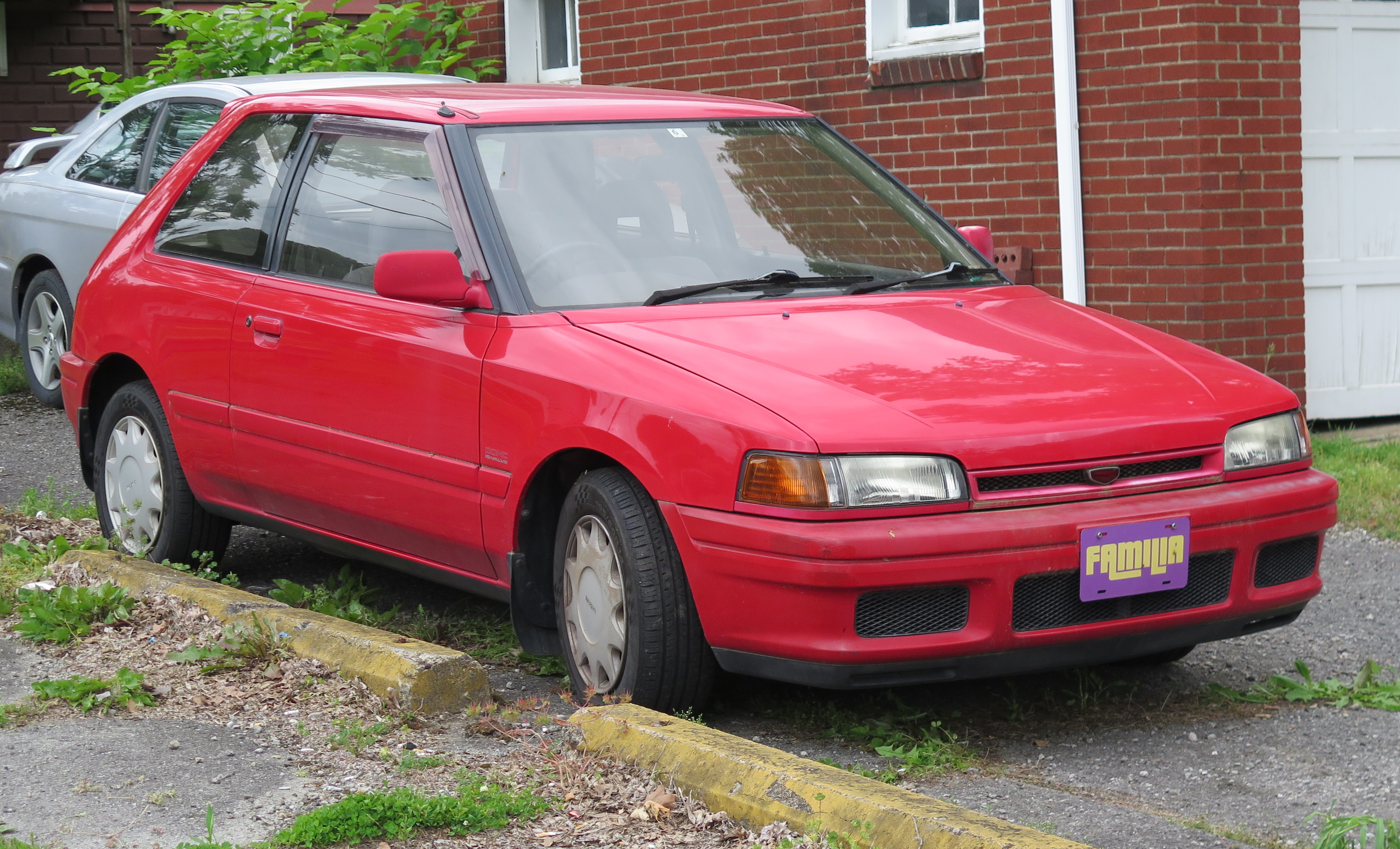
1989–1991 Mazda Familia GT hatchback (Japan)

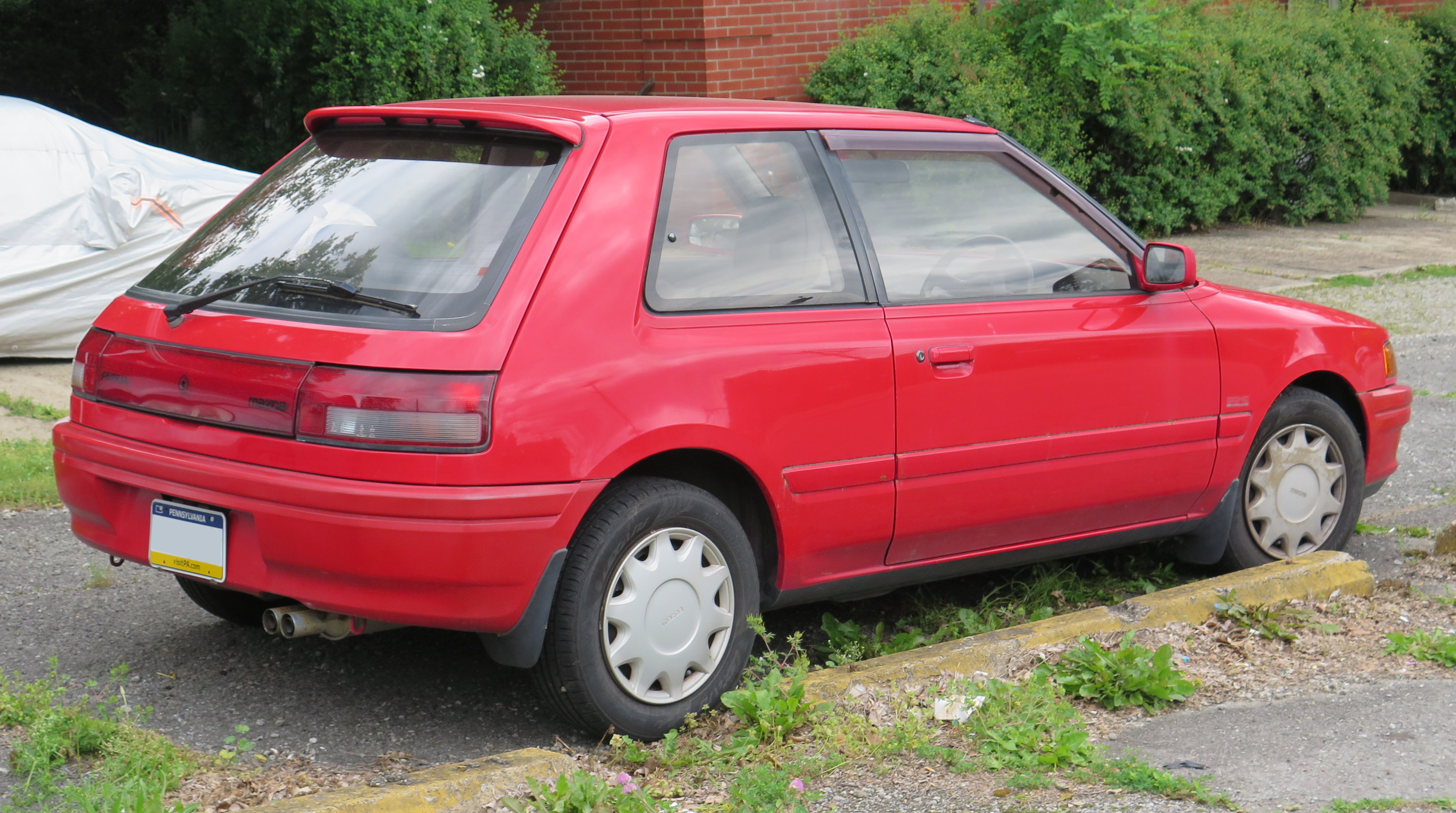
1989–1991 Mazda Familia hatchback (Japan)

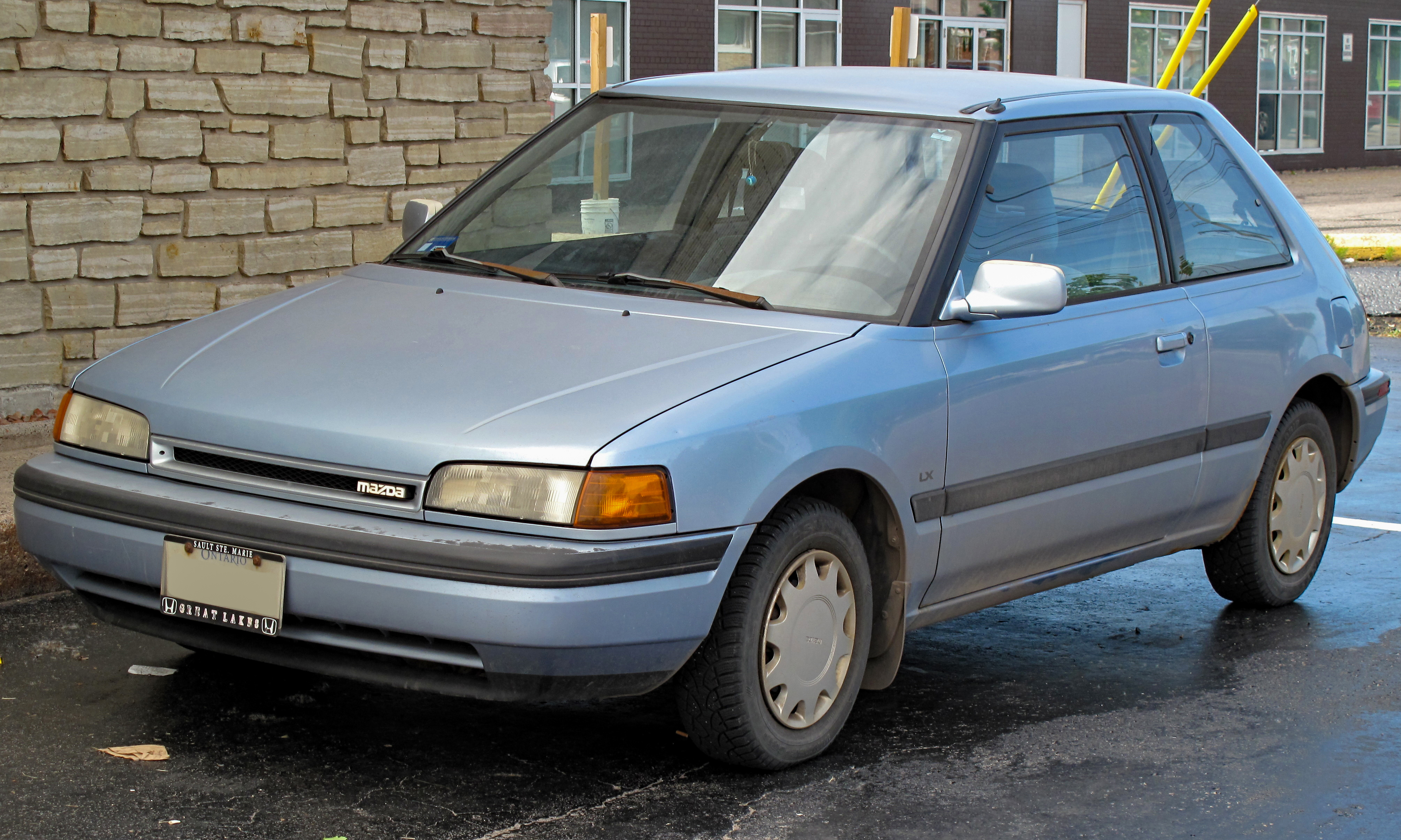
1990–1992 Mazda 323 hatchback (Canada)

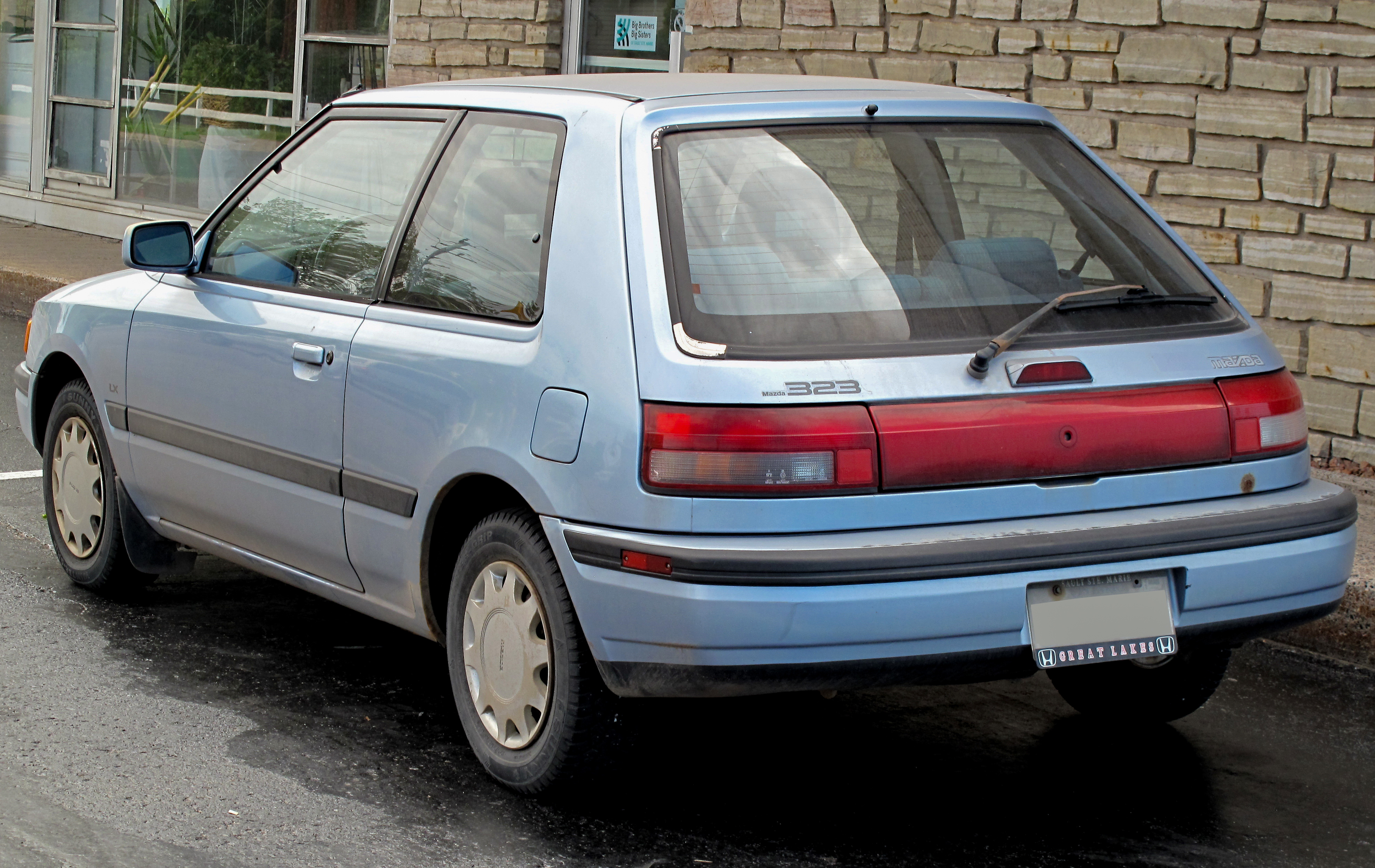
1990–1992 Mazda 323 hatchback (Canada)

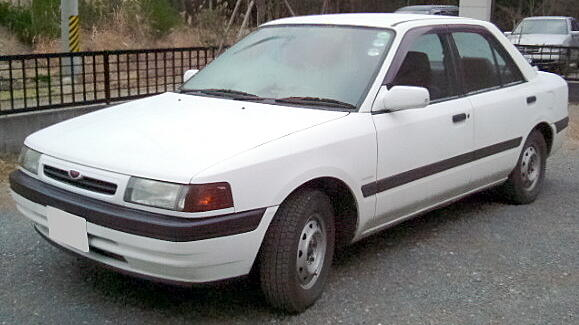
1991–1994 Mazda Familia Clair saloon (Japan)

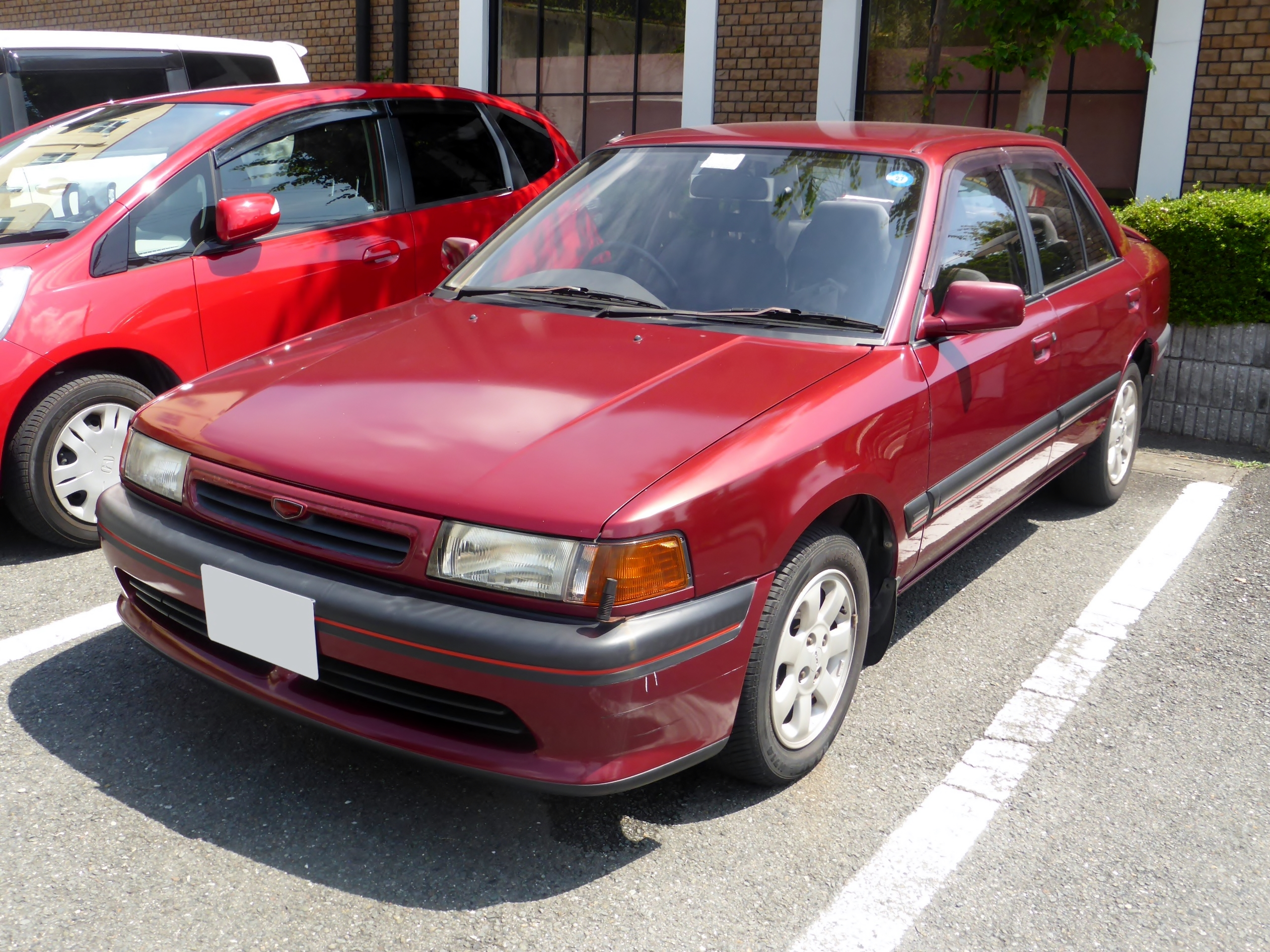
1991–1994 Mazda Familia Interplay saloon (Japan)

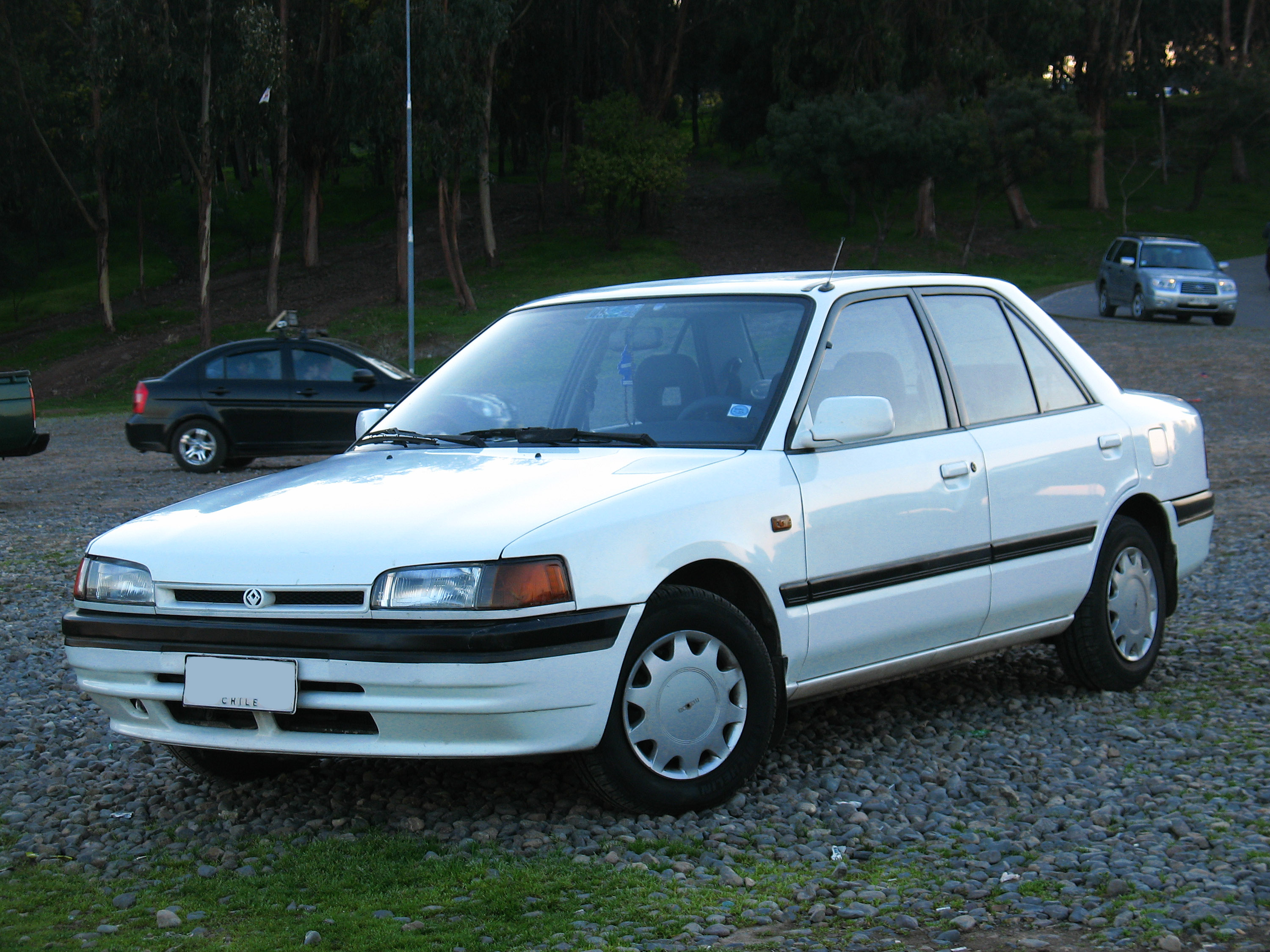
1991–1994 Mazda 323 saloon (Chile)

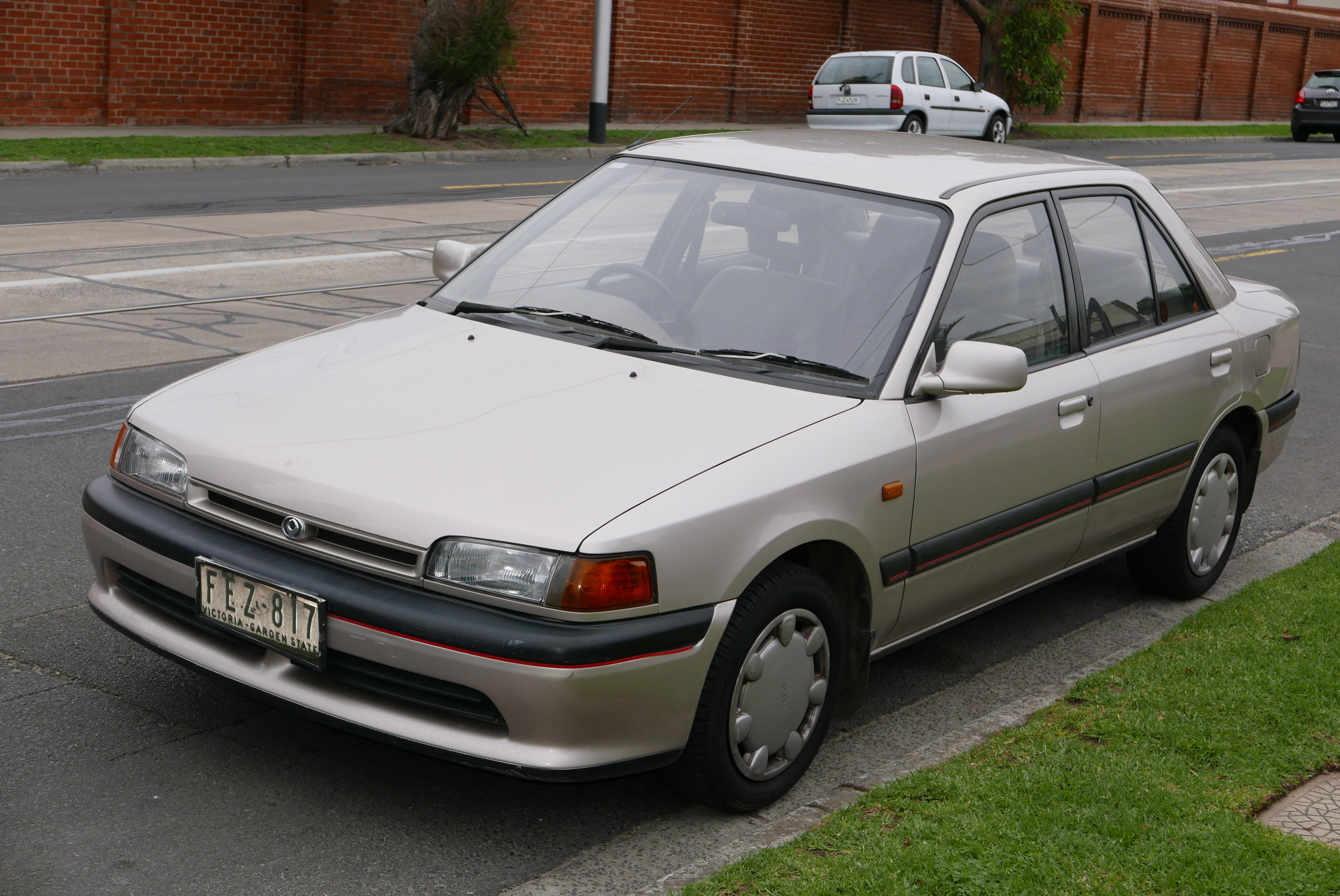
1991–1994 Mazda 323 saloon (Australia)

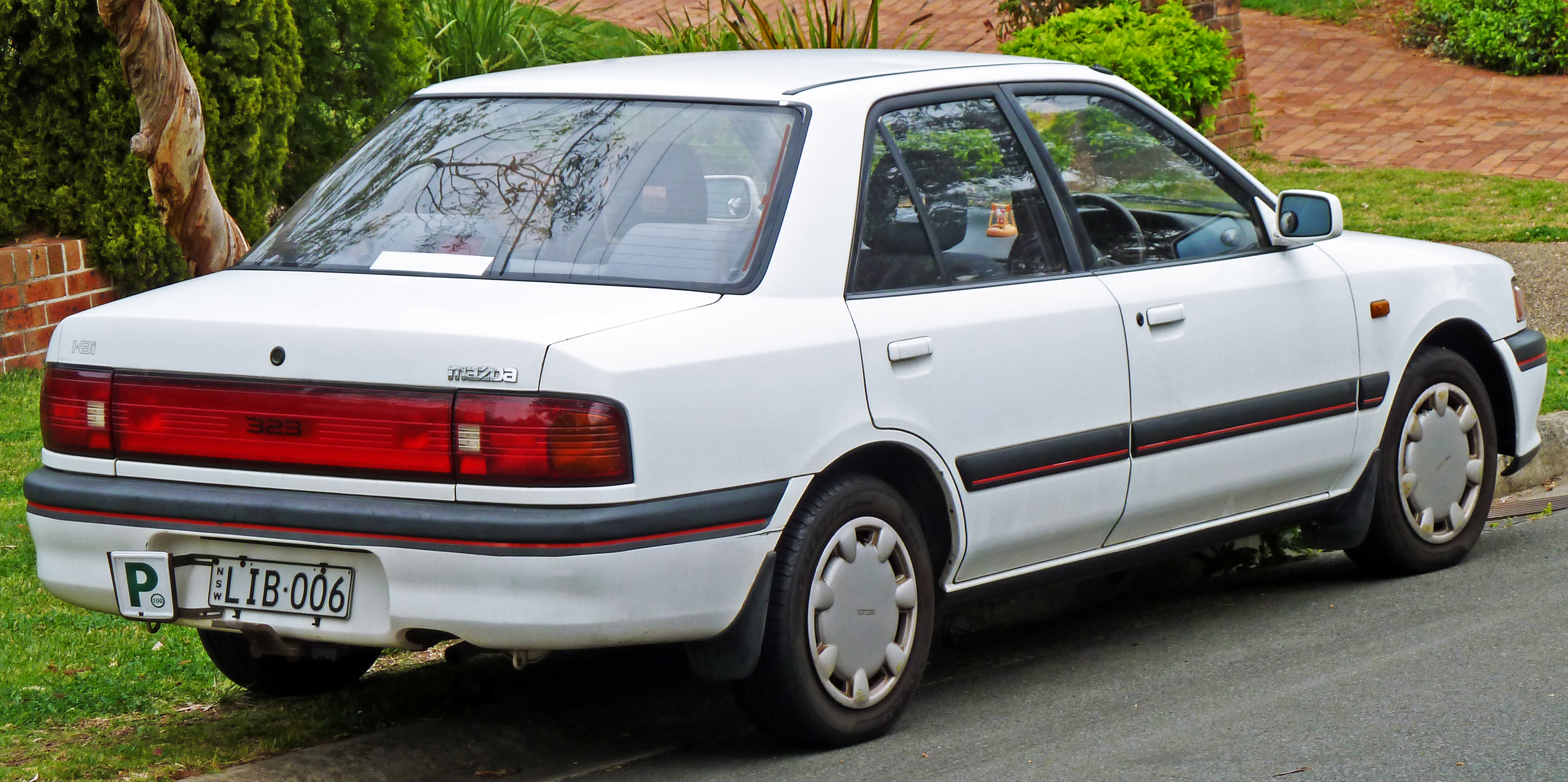
1991–1994 Mazda 323 saloon (Australia)

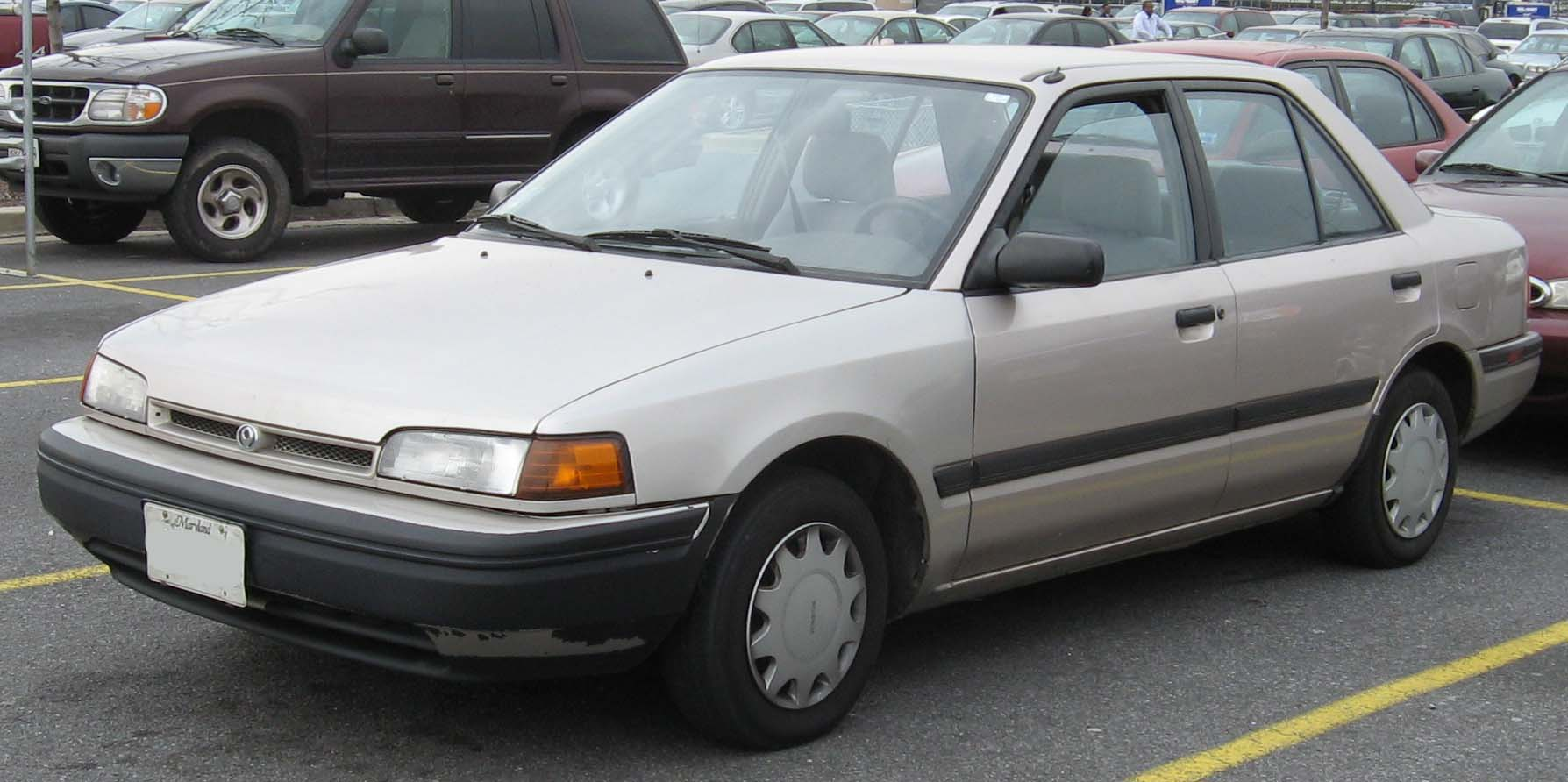
1992–1994 Mazda Protegé (US)

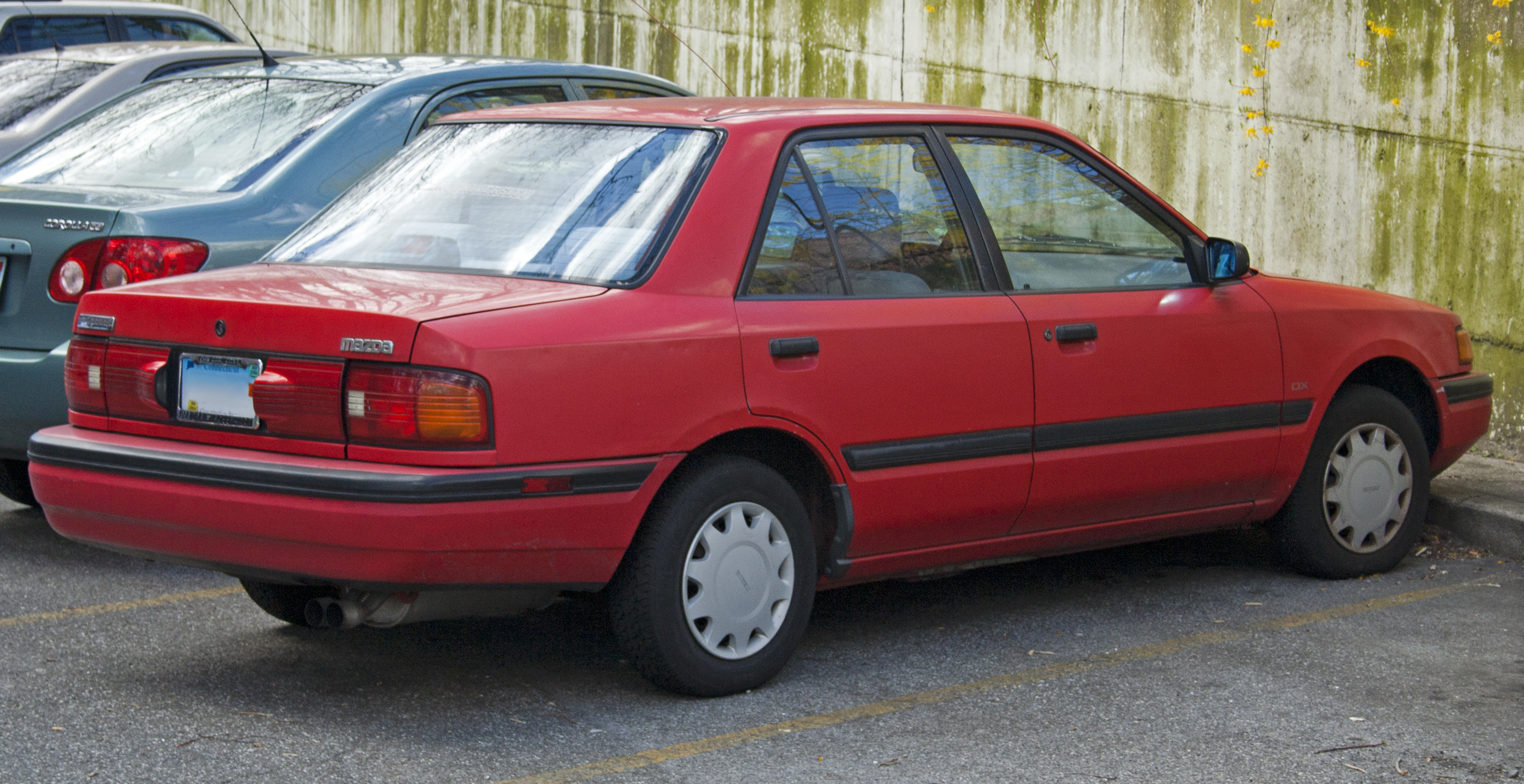
1992–1994 Mazda Protegé (US)

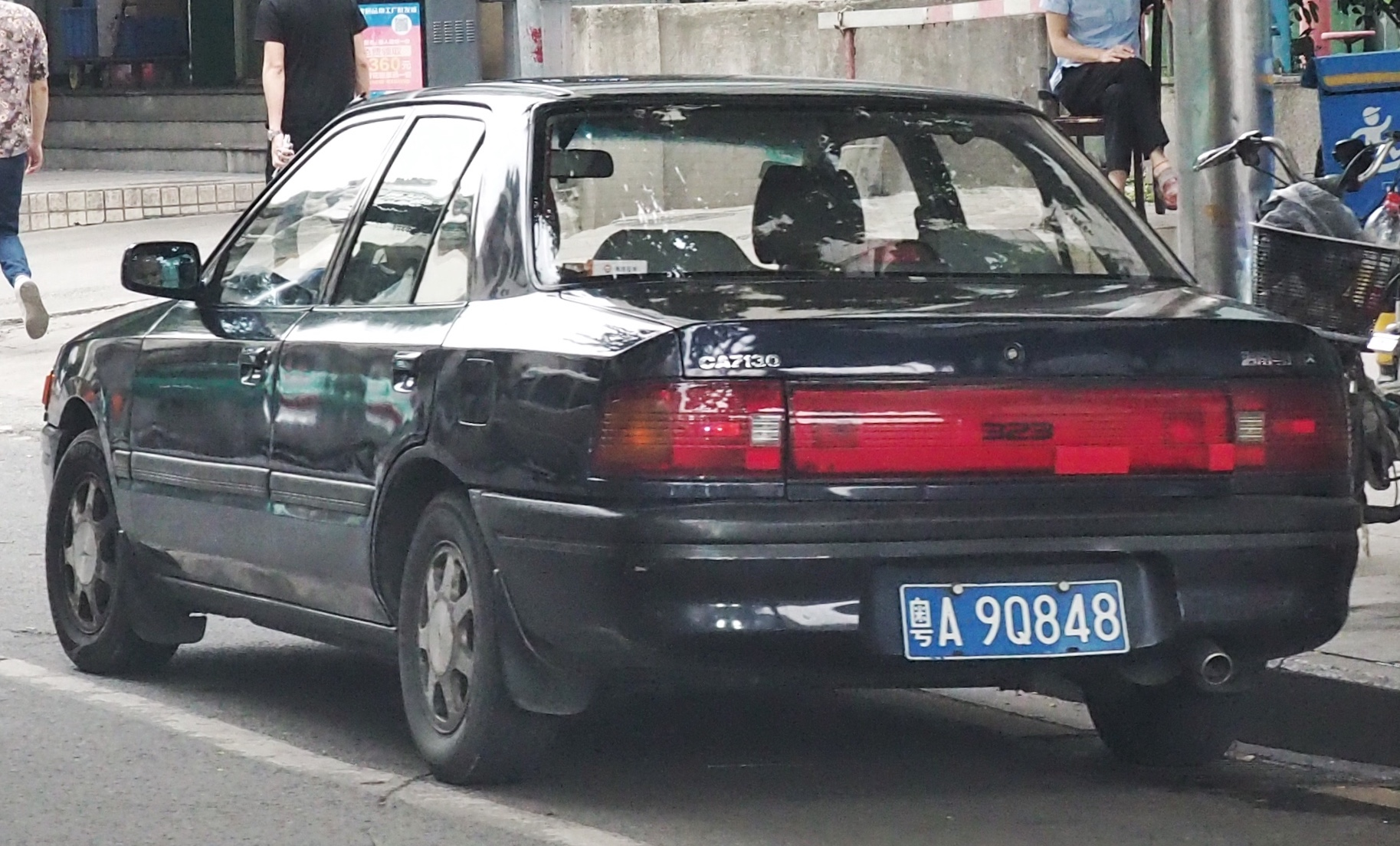
1999–2004 Haima CA7130 (China)

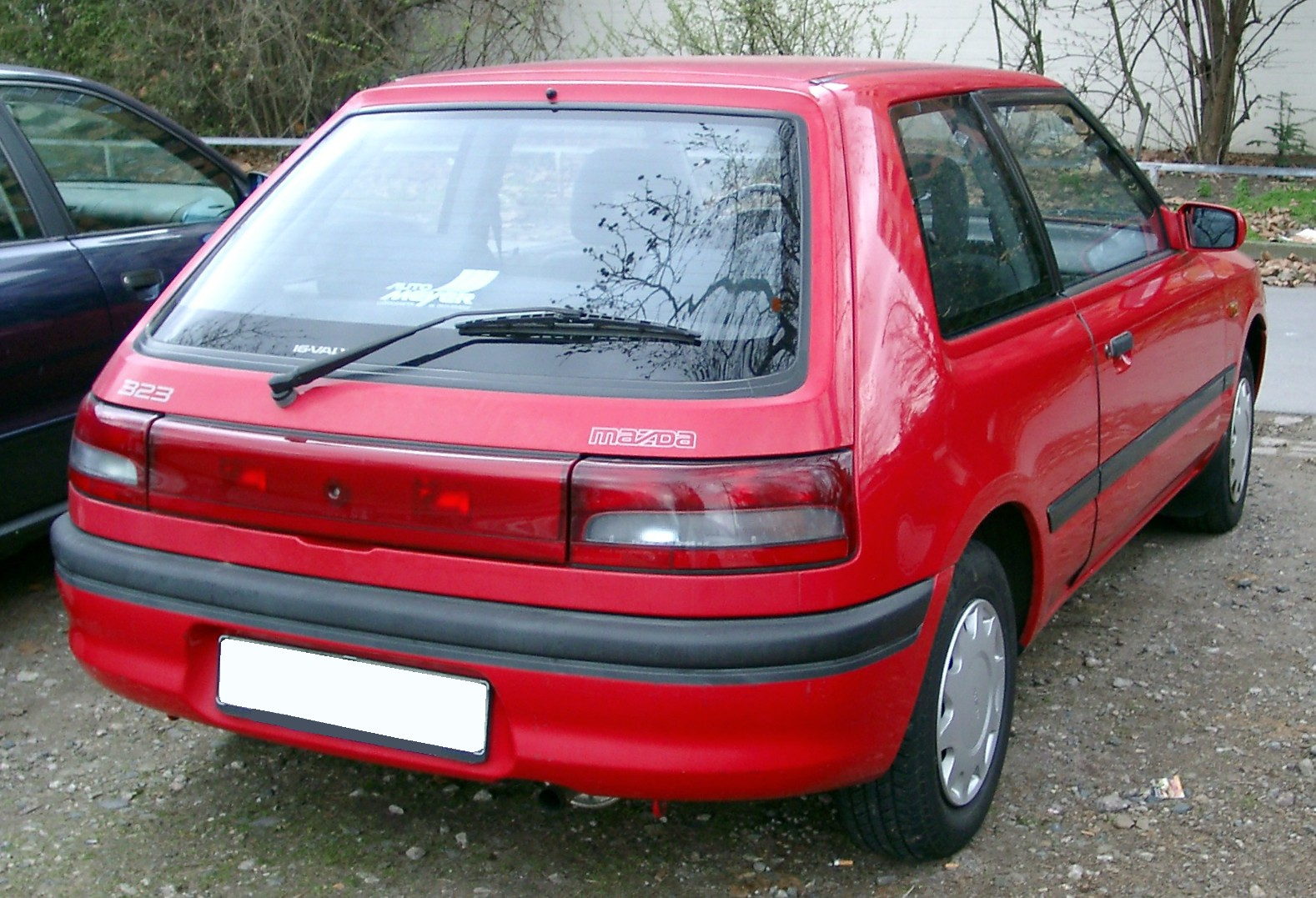
1991–1994 Mazda 323 hatchback (Europe)

=== Familia GT-X, GT-A, GT-R, GT-Ae ===
For Group A rallying, Mazda made two main homologation models. The JDM GT-X model was released in 1990 and featured four-wheel drive, viscous limited-slip differentials and a turbocharged 1.8 L BPT engine which produced 185 PS (136 kW; 182 hp). Mazda also Produced 300 GT-A variants to celebrate the launch of the BG Familia GT-X and its rally debut. These were stripped of most luxuries and delivered with Mazdaspeed Torsen rear differential, short ratio gearbox, roll cage, harnesses, grille mounted fog lights. A graphics pack was also available. In Europe, the engine of the GT-X model was detuned to produce 166 PS (122 kW; 164 hp).

The GT-R model was released in 1992, produced for around 5,000 units. The GT-R featuring a number of enhancements over the GT-X model: an aggressive front bumper, grille and bonnet vents, updated rear bumper, wheel flares, stiffer suspension and anti-roll bars with thicker cross members, and homologated five-stud wheel hubs with larger brakes. The interior was fitted with leather and faux suede seats, and had the option of replacing the cupholder with a 3-gauge cluster. In addition, the GT-R has stronger connecting rods and pistons, larger oil squirters, larger nose crank, larger oil cooler, sodium filled valves, a baffled inlet manifold, larger injectors, removed boost cut, front-mounted intercooler, and an IHI VJ-23 ball bearing water-cooled turbocharger. Power was increased to 210 PS (154 kW; 207 hp). Just like the GT-X, the engine power of the European market GT-R was also lowered to produce 185 PS (136 kW; 182 hp).

As per the first GT-X, 300 units special version of GT-R were produced known as GT-Ae. These shared the power output of the GT-R, but were 30 kg (66 lb) lighter, fitted with closer ratio gearboxes, and featured a larger top spoiler with a gap between the hatch and the spoiler to direct air to the new lower spoiler. The wiring for ABS, air conditioning, power mirrors, power windows, power locks, and sunroof was removed. Instead of using the GT-R's leather interior, the lighter cloth interior of the GT-X was used.

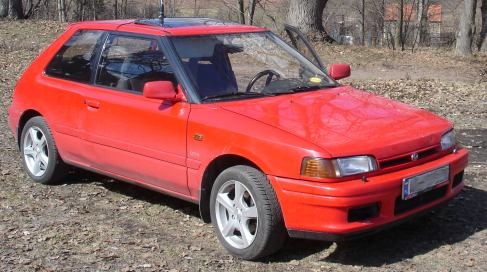
1989–1991 Mazda 323 GT-X (Europe)

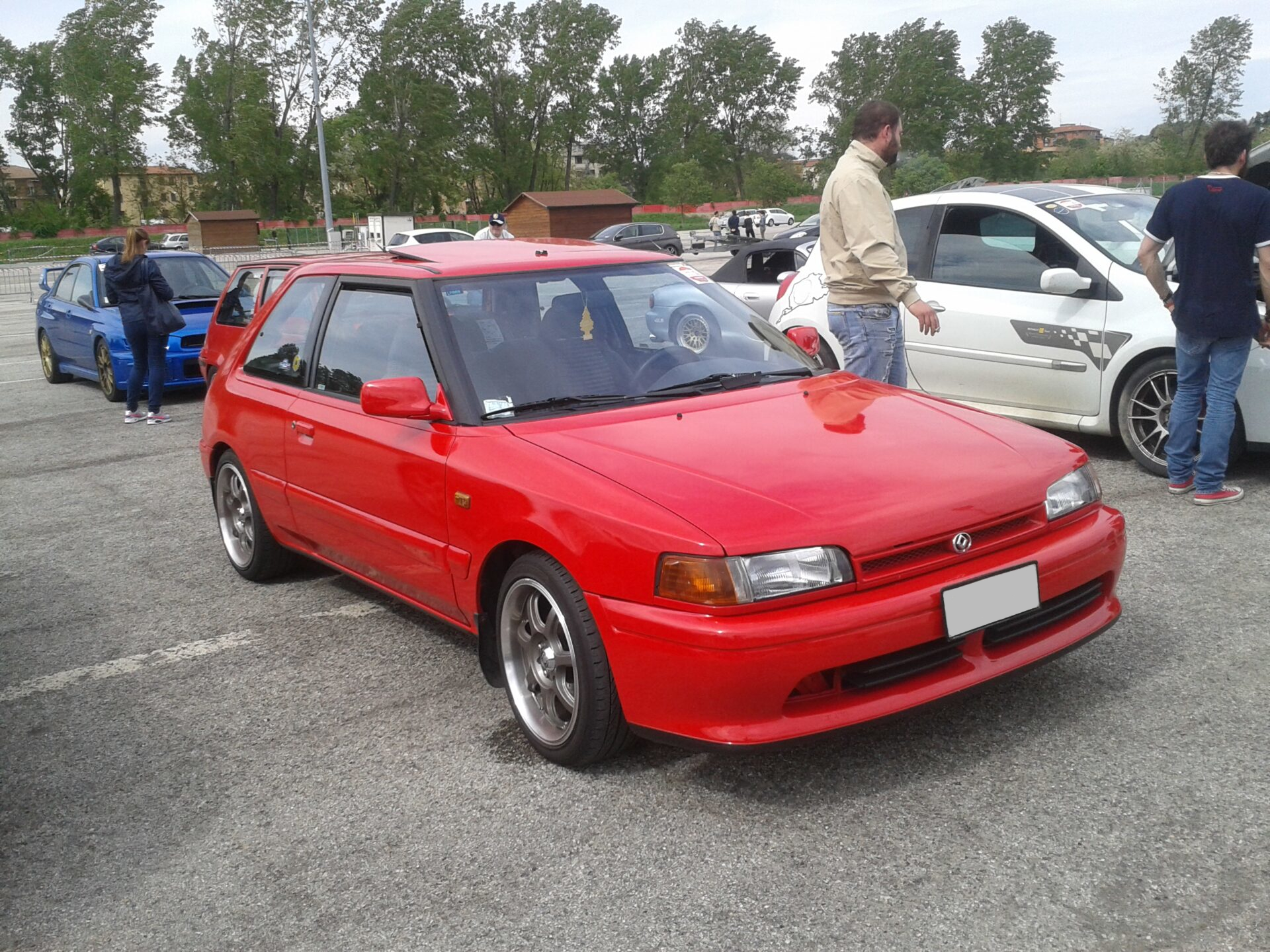
1991–1994 Mazda 323 GT-X hatchback (Europe)

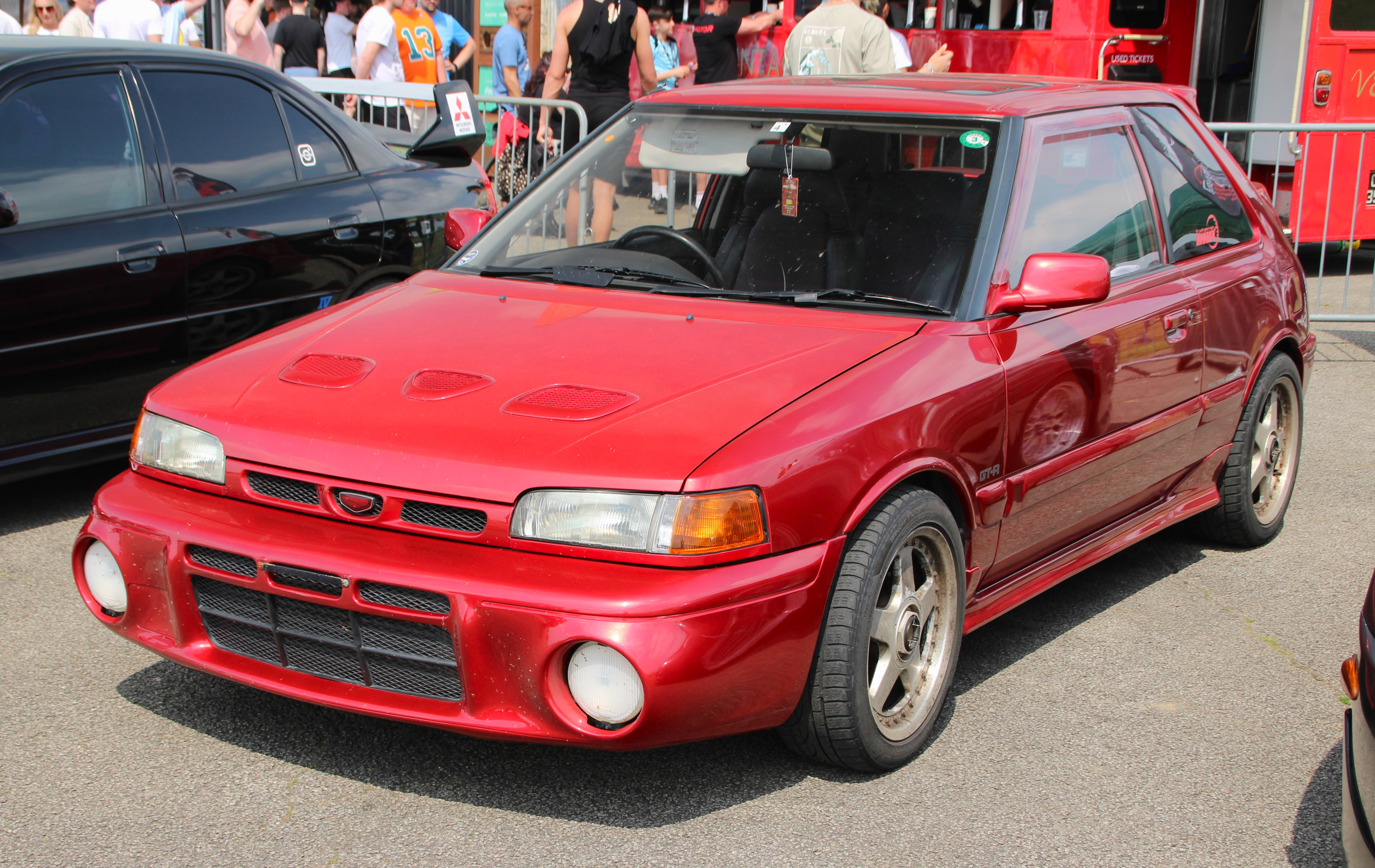
Mazda Familia GT-R (Japan)

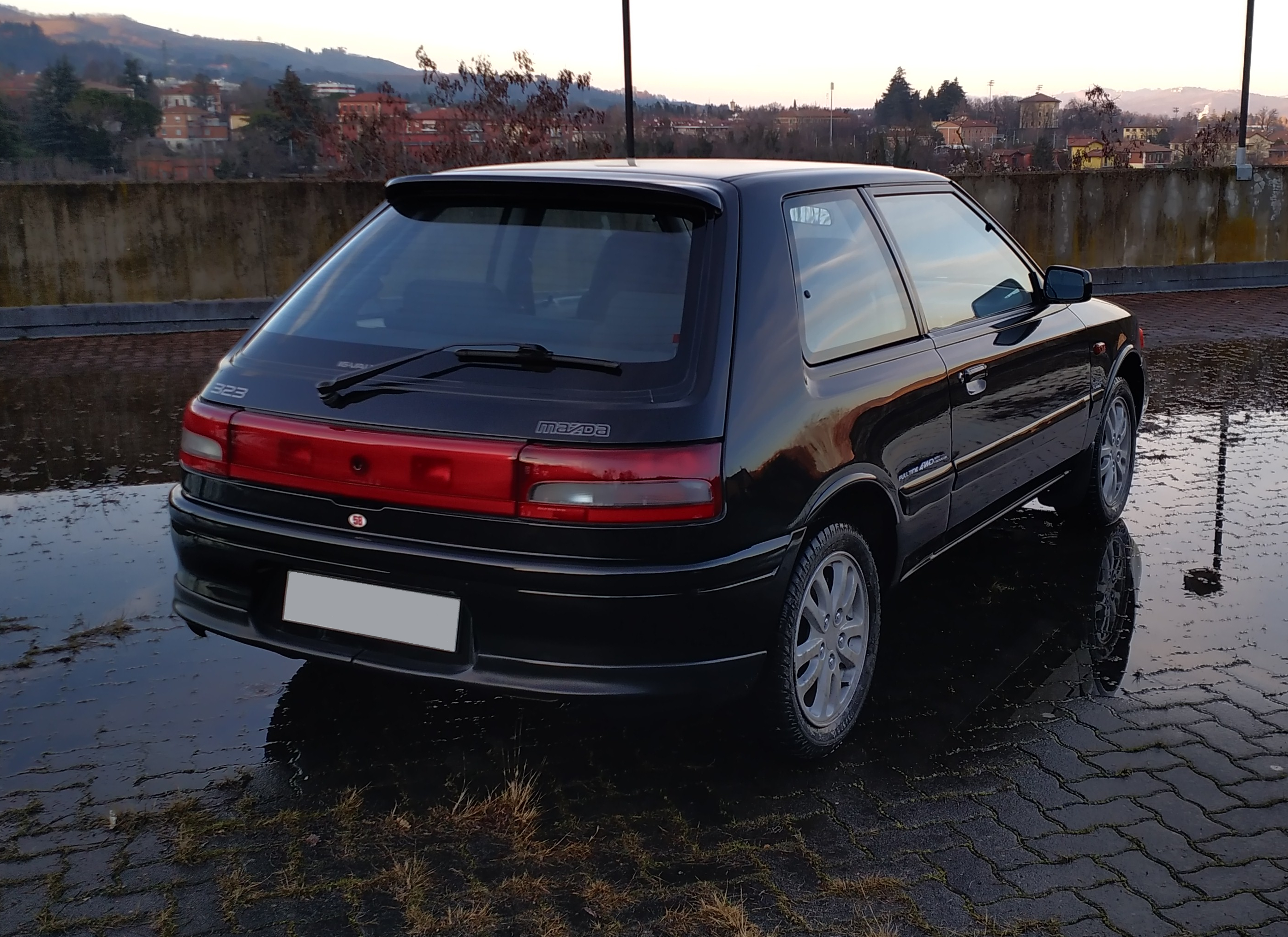
Mazda 323 GT-R (Europe)

=== Astina/323F ===
A sporty, five-door liftback version was called the Familia Astina in Japan. In other markets, it was called 323F and 323 Astina. A luxury version was also sold in Japan as the Eunos 100. The car was produced from 1989 until 1994 before being replaced by the Lantis. A key feature of the Astina/323F is the front end with its pop-up headlights. Depending on the market, there were carbureted or fuel injected SOHC/DOHC versions available of the 1.5, 1.6 and 1.8 L petrol engines. Unlike the standard Familia saloons and three-door hatchback, the Astina never came from the factory with a turbo, diesel or all-wheel drive option.

Taillight arrangement varies from market to market, the main difference being the third brake light in the spoiler and two brake lights per cluster (Japanese spec), rather than one. Compared to the Eunos 100, the Familia Astina has some differences, such as a different trunk garnish, a shorter spoiler, available with SOHC engine options, and lacked the optional digital speedometer.

In the UK the 323F was launched with 1.6 L 16-valve in either LX, GLX or GLXi trim or as 1.8i 16v GT. In Indonesia it is called Astina GT and RX3 (a special model featured aero kits), it came standard with a 1.8 L DOHC BP engine and a digital speedometer from the JDM Eunos 100.

The 323 Astina GLX was sold in South America as well, specifically in Colombia, Chile and Argentina, with 1.6 L SOHC engine, in carbureted version.

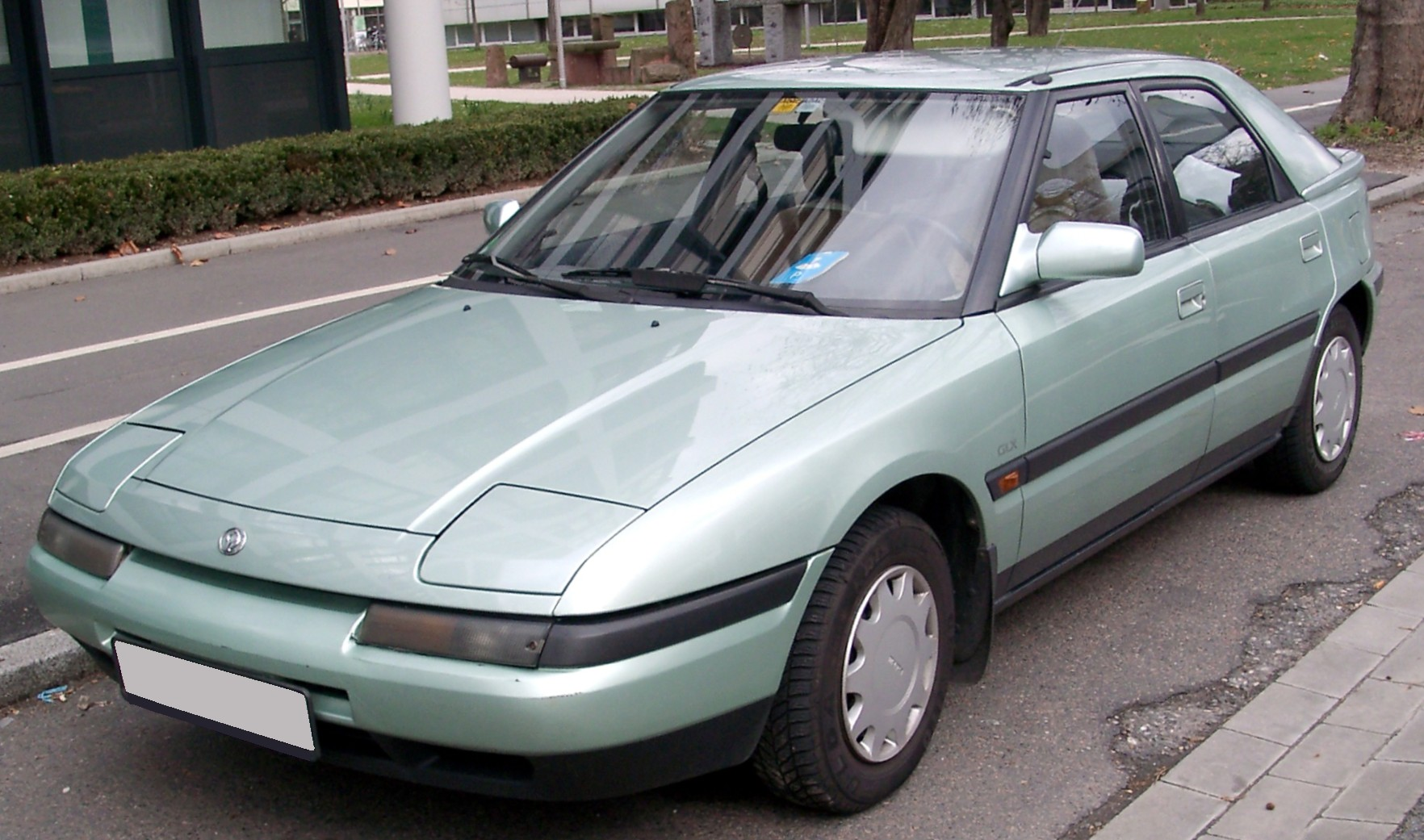
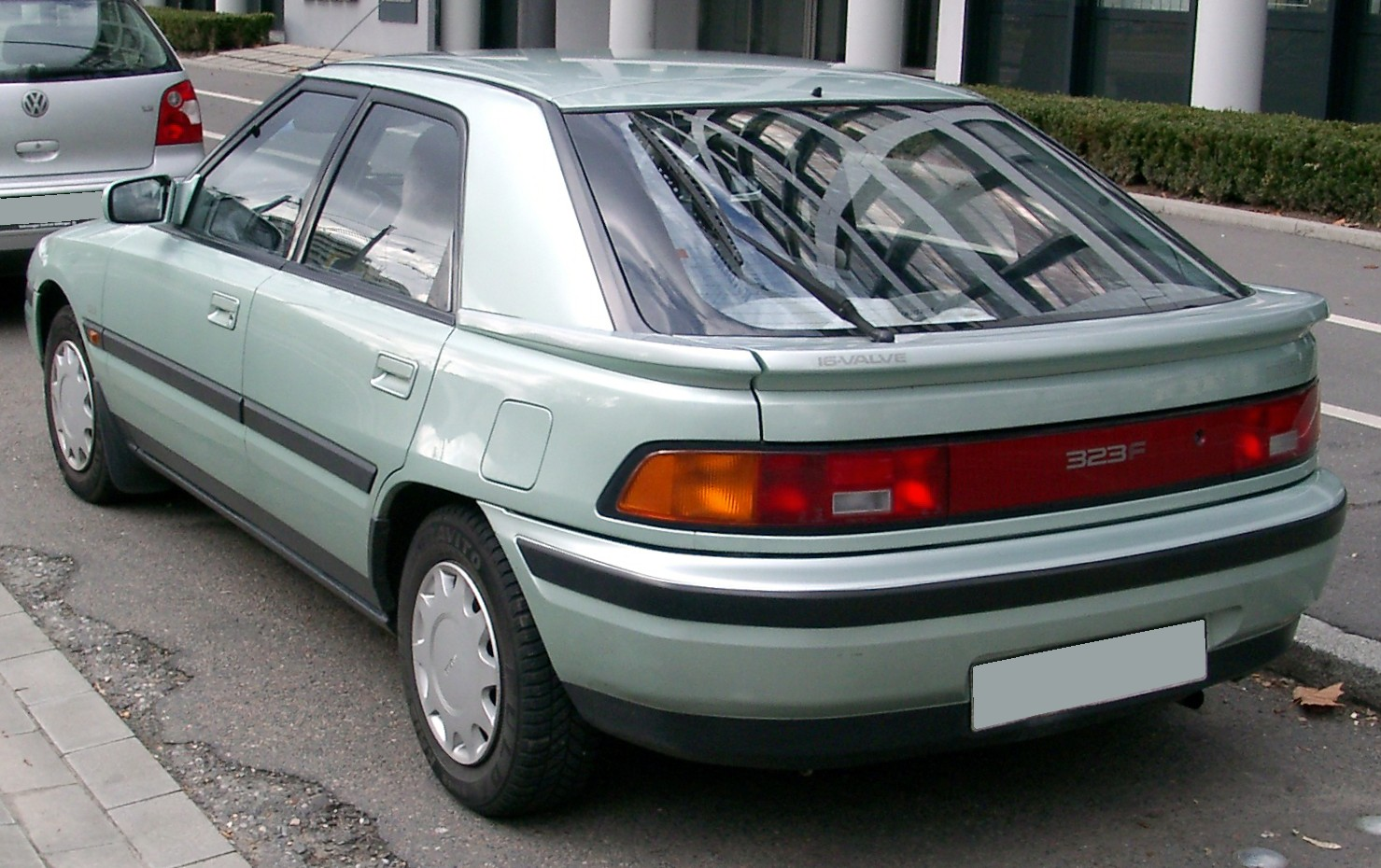
1989–1994 Mazda 323F (Europe)

Engines

- 1989–1991 – 1.3 L (1,323 cc) B3, 1 barrel, 8-valve, 76 PS (56 kW) / 101 N⋅m (74 lb⋅ft)
- 1991–1994 – 1.3 L (1,323 cc) B3, EGI-S, 8-valve, 79 PS (58 kW) / 103 N⋅m (76 lb⋅ft)
- 1989–1991 – 1.5 L (1,498 cc) B5-M, carburetor, 16-valve, 91 PS (67 kW) / 122 N⋅m (90 lb⋅ft)
- 1990–1994 – 1.5 L (1,498 cc) B5-MI, EGI-S, 16-valve 94 PS (69 kW) / 123 N⋅m (91 lb⋅ft)
- 1989–1991 – 1.5 L (1,498 cc) B5-DE, EFi, 16-valve DOHC, 110 PS (81 kW) / 127 N⋅m (94 lb⋅ft)
- 1991–1994 – 1.5 L (1,498 cc) B5-DE, EFi, 16-valve DOHC, 115–120 PS (85–88 kW) / 132 N⋅m (97 lb⋅ft) (lower power for AT cars)
- 1989–1991 – 1.6 L (1,597 cc) B6, 1 barrel, 8-valve, 85 hp (63 kW; 86 PS) / 92 lb⋅ft (125 N⋅m)
- 1989–1994 – 1.6 L (1,597 cc) B6, carburetor, 16-valve, SOHC, 103 hp (77 kW; 104 PS) / 108 lb⋅ft (146 N⋅m)
- 1989–1994 – 1.8 L (1,839 cc) BP, FI, 16-valve DOHC, 140 hp (104 kW; 142 PS) / 118 lb⋅ft (160 N⋅m)
- 1989–1994 – 1.8 L (1,839 cc) BPT, FI, 16-valve DOHC, turbo, 180 PS (132 kW) / 237 N⋅m (175 lb⋅ft) (Familia GT-X)
- 1991–1994 – 1.8 L (1,839 cc) B8, FI, 16-valve SOHC, 103 hp (77 kW)
- 1992–1993 – 1.8 L (1,839 cc) BPD, FI, 16-valve DOHC, turbo, 210 PS (154 kW) / 255 N⋅m (188 lb⋅ft) (Familia GT-R & GT-Ae)
- 1989–1994 – 1.7 L (1,720 cc) PN, Diesel, 8-valve, 57 PS (42 kW) / 112 N⋅m (83 lb⋅ft) (European specs)

== Eighth generation (BH/BA; 1994) ==
Eighth generation (BH/BA)
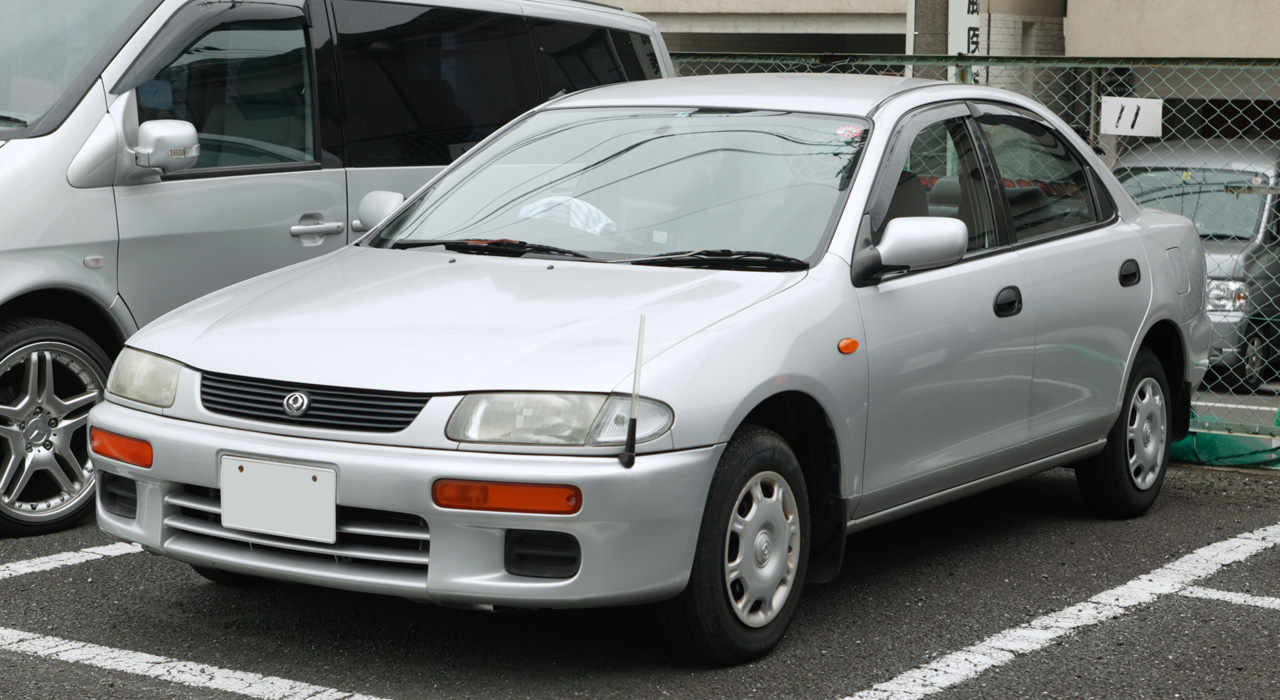
- 1994–1996 Mazda Familia saloon (Japan)

Overview
- Also called: Mazda 323; Mazda Allegro; Mazda Artis; Mazda Lantis; Mazda Protegé; Mazda Étude
- Production: 1994–1998; 1995–1999 (Colombia); 1995–2000 (Indonesia); 1996–2000 (Philippines)
- Assembly: Japan: Hōfu (Nishinoura H1 plant); Colombia: Bogotá (CCA); South Africa: Pretoria (Samcor); Philippines: Parañaque (Columbian Autocar Corporation); Thailand: Rayong; Indonesia: Bekasi; New Zealand: Wiri; Zimbabwe: Willowvale (WMMI)
- Designer: Yujiro Daikoku (1992)

Body and chassis
- Body style: 3-door coupé hatchback; 3-door hatchback; 4-door saloon
- Layout: Front-engine, front-wheel-drive; Front-engine, all-wheel-drive (Japan)
- Platform: Mazda BH platform
- Related: Mazda 323F/Lantis/Allegro; Ford Laser; Ford Escort; Mercury Tracer

Powertrain
- Engine: petrol: 1.3 L B3-ME I4; 1.5 L Z5-DE/DEL I4; 1.5 L B5-ZE; 1.6 L B6D I4; 1.8 L BP-ZE I4; Diesel: 1.7 L 4EE1 turbo I4; 2.0 L RF I4
- Transmission: 3-speed F3A automatic transmission; 4-speed F4A-EL automatic transmission; 5-speed manual transmission

Dimensions
- Wheelbase: Coupé/Hatchback: 2,505 mm (99 in); Saloon: 2,605 mm (103 in)
- Length: Coupé: 4,030 mm (159 in); Hatchback: 4,040 mm (159 in); Saloon: 4,335 mm (171 in); Saloon: 4,440 mm (175 in) (AWD/North America)
- Width: 1,710 mm (67 in) (International); 1,695 mm (67 in) (Japan)
- Height: Coupé/Hatchback: 1,405–1,420 mm (55–56 in); Saloon: 1,420–1,440 mm (56–57 in)
- Curb weight: Hatchback: 980–1,105 kg (2,161–2,436 lb); Coupé: 1,010–1,030 kg (2,227–2,271 lb); Saloon: 1,040–1,270 kg (2,293–2,800 lb)

The eighth generation was released for the Japanese domestic market in June 1994 with front-wheel drive. The saloon version was again sold as the "Mazda Protegé" in North America, as the Mazda Artis in some South American markets, as the "Mazda Étude" in South Africa and as Mazda Allegro in Colombia. Originally there was a three-door coupé (323C/Familia Neo) available, but after sluggish sales, a hatchback version based on the facelifted Familia saloon replaced it.

This generation grew considerably, with the four-door saloon's wheelbase only 5 millimetres short of the then-current Mazda 626, a mid-size car. The car was not originally offered with a 1.3-litre engine in Japan, with the lineup beginning with the bigger 1.5-litre. To close this gap in the lineup, the BG hatchback with the 1.3-litre engine was kept available until October 1996, when the new hatchback model was introduced (323P) and the smaller engine was made available.

An unusual JDM station wagon model appeared in September 1994, with the discontinuation of the 1985-generation station wagon. The Mazda Familia Van offered after this year was a rebadged Nissan AD/Wingroad/Sunny California, which was essentially the station wagon version of the Nissan Sunny/Sentra/Pulsar (N14). A new model appeared in the same month, when a lean-burn version called the GS-L arrived: its Z5-DEL engine produces 94 PS (69 kW), three down on the regular Z5-DE, but gas mileage improved by ten to fifteen percent. Another loan was the 1.7-litre intercooled turbo-diesel engine purchased from Isuzu for use in saloons since October 1994. These models have a prominent bonnet scoop. At about the same time a all-wheel-drive model was introduced in Japan, either with a 1.6-litre petrol or the Isuzu turbo-diesel. The 4WD cars can be easily identified by having been equipped with the federalized front (but not rear) bumper, including side marker lights.

The rare North American ES model came with the Miata (NA)'s 1.8-litre twin-cam engine (though the internals were not entirely the same), all-wheel disc brakes, and dual stabilizer bars. The same car went on sale in Australia in the second half of 1994 with a fully featured BP-ZE engine. The Protegé became classified as a "compact car" for the 1995 model year in North America.

A version with Mazdaspeed accessories was released in Japan and Philippines. It came equipped with Mazdaspeed wrap around bodykit, Mazdaspeed rear spoiler, Momo steering wheel, 15-inch Rota Astral wheels wrapped in 195/55R15 Bridgestone Potenza RE01 tires, Mazdaspeed strut tower bar, Eibach springs, gas-charged shock absorbers, swaybars and Mazdaspeed exhaust made by Yumex.

The Familia/Protegé/323 was facelifted in October 1996, with a newer somewhat calmer style. This generation was discontinued in 1998 in most markets, but continued to be available in some markets until 1999 or 2000. For example, the 3-door hatchback was available in Europe until October 2000.

Models

- Four-door saloon (called the Protegé in North America, 323S in Europe, 323 Protegé in Australia, 323 Lantis/Familia in Indonesia, Allegro in Colombia, Artis in Chile and Étude in South Africa)
- Three-door coupé hatchback (Familia Neo in Japan, 323C in Europe and 323 in Canada)
- Three-door hatchback (called the 323P in Europe)
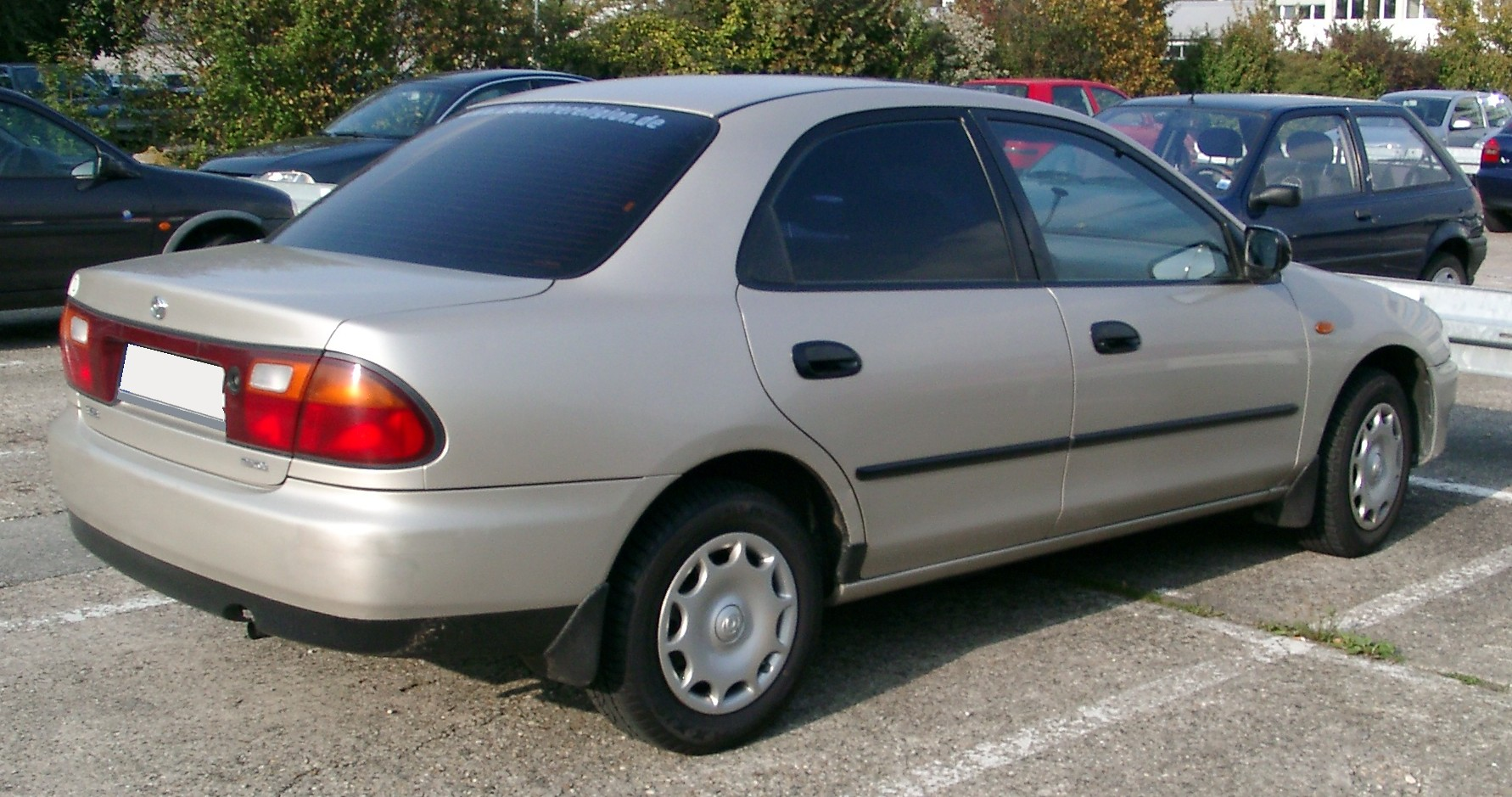
1994–1996 Mazda 323S saloon (Europe)

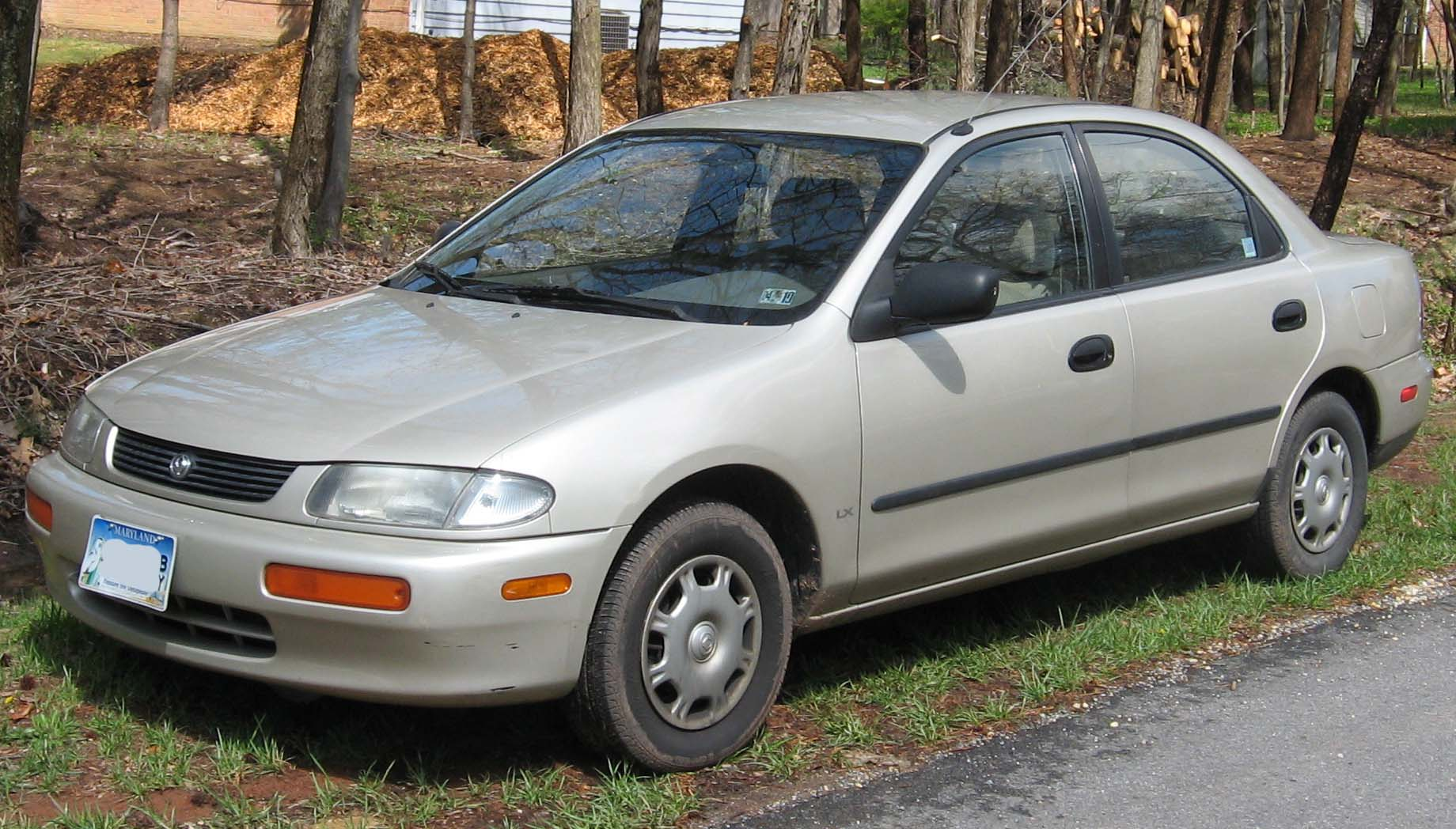
1995–1996 Mazda Protegé saloon (US)

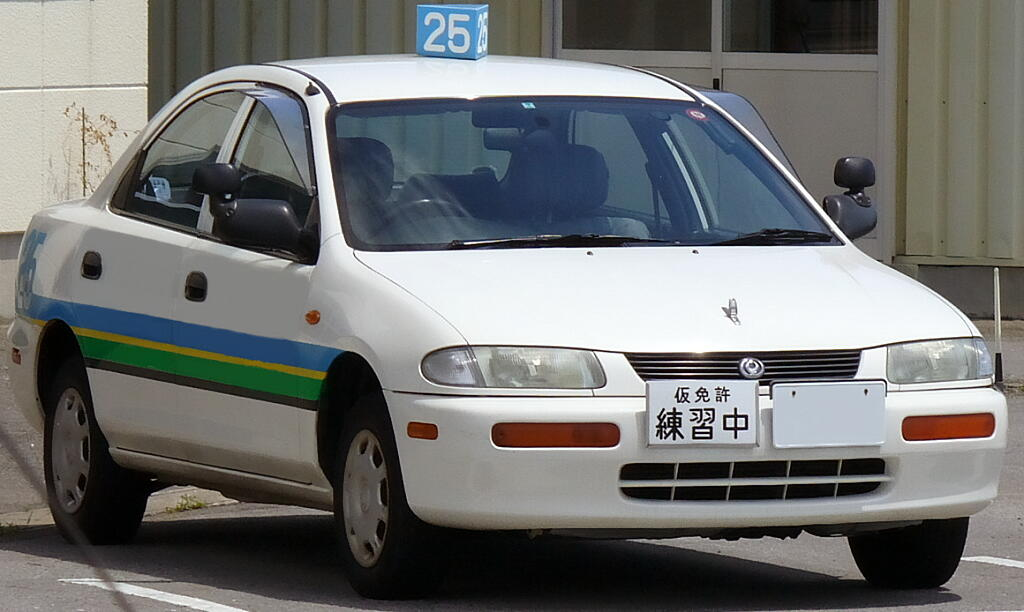
1995–1996 Mazda Familia saloon AWD (Japan) with North American market front bumper

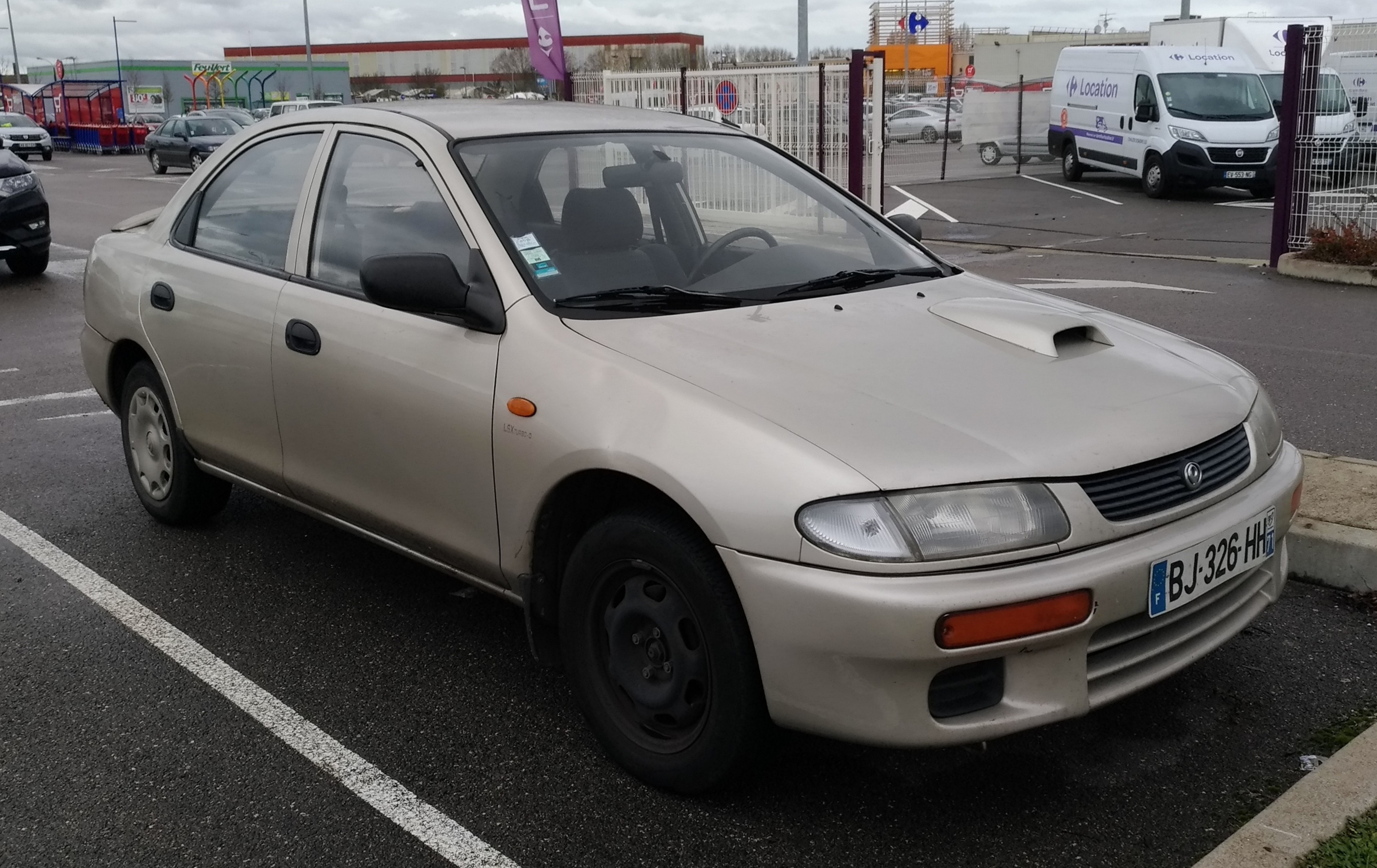
1994–1996 Mazda 323S saloon (Europe) with 1.7-litre turbo-diesel engine

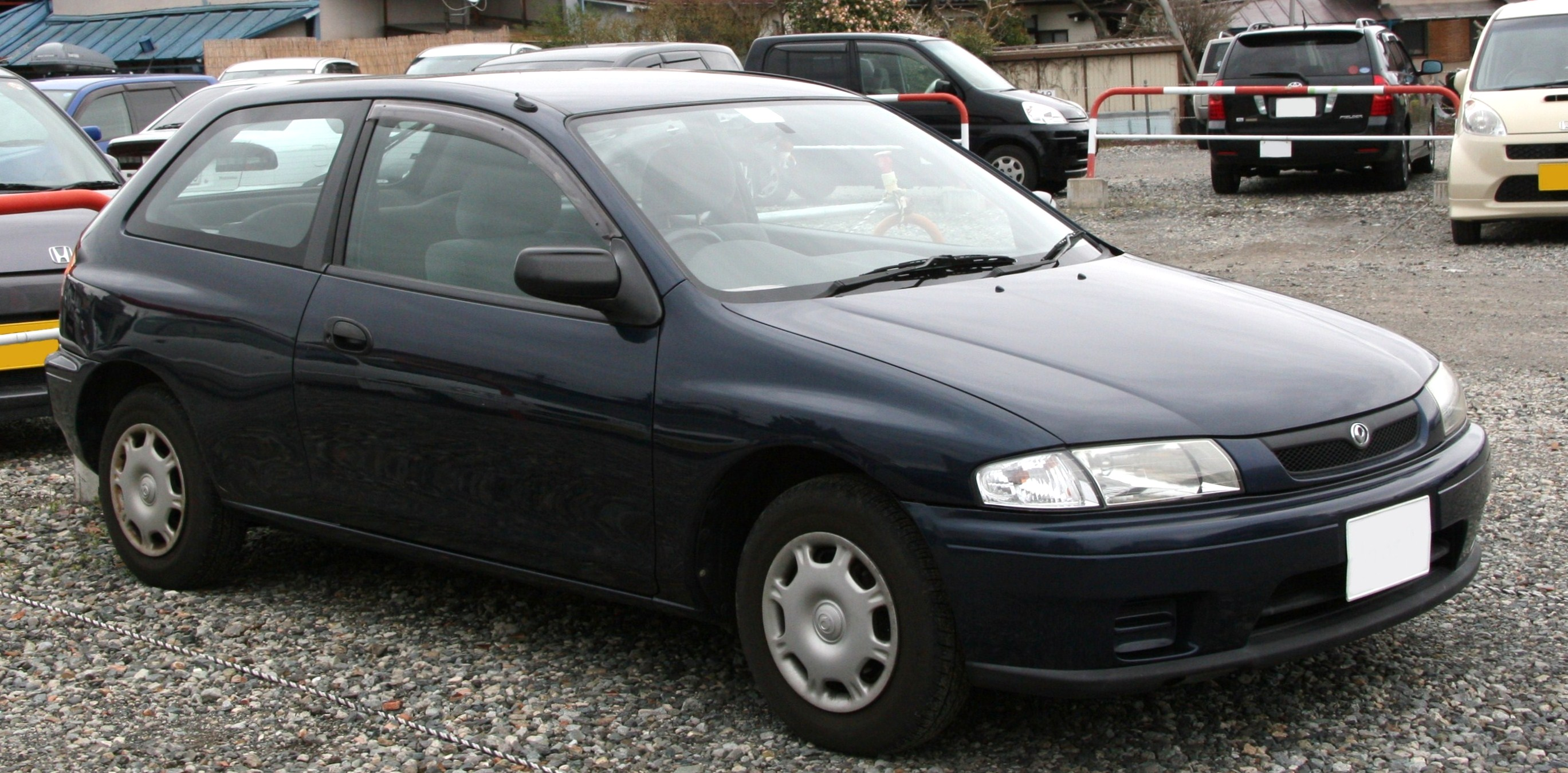
1996–1997 Mazda Familia hatchback (Japan)

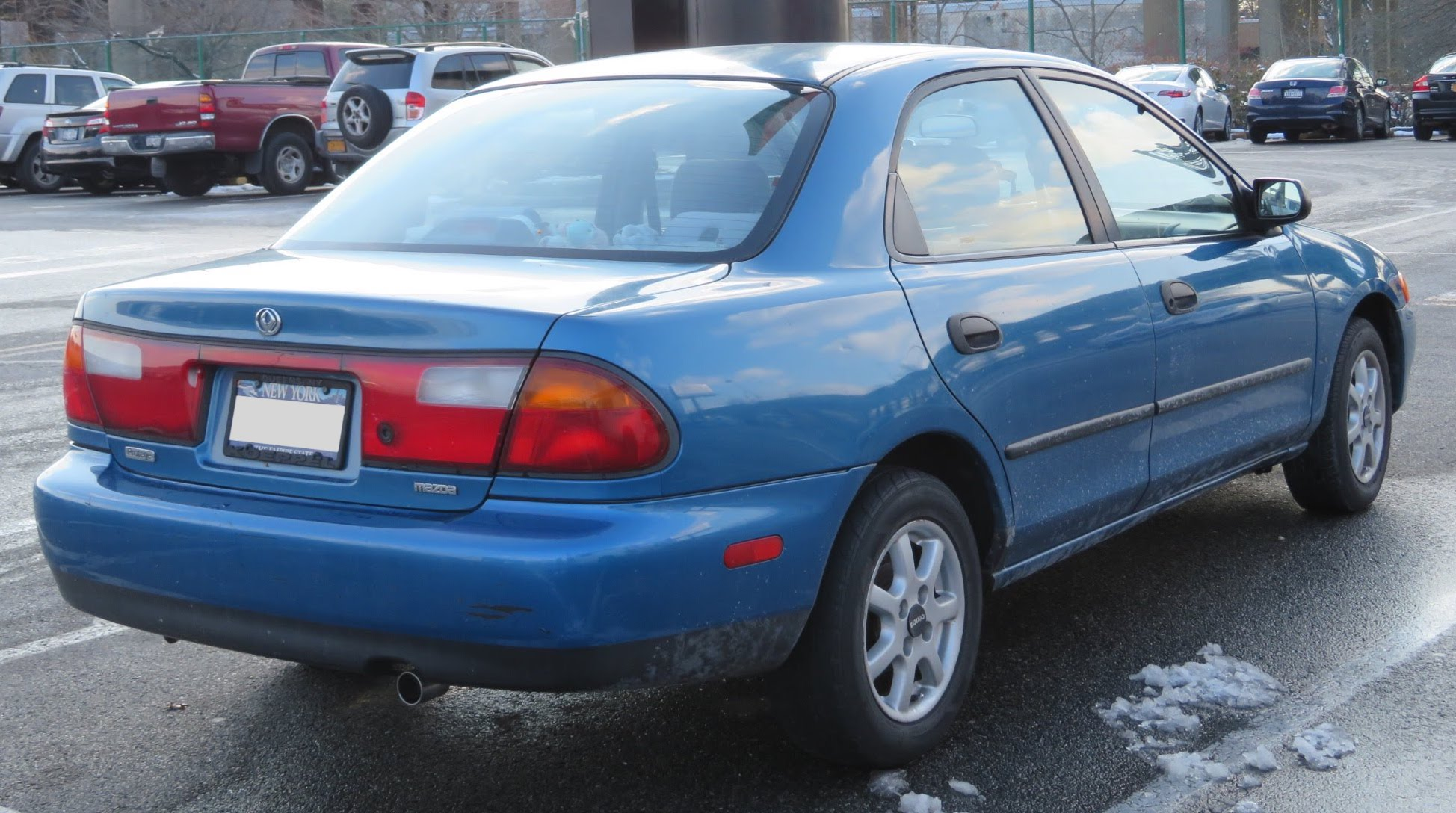
1996–1997 Mazda Protegé saloon (US)

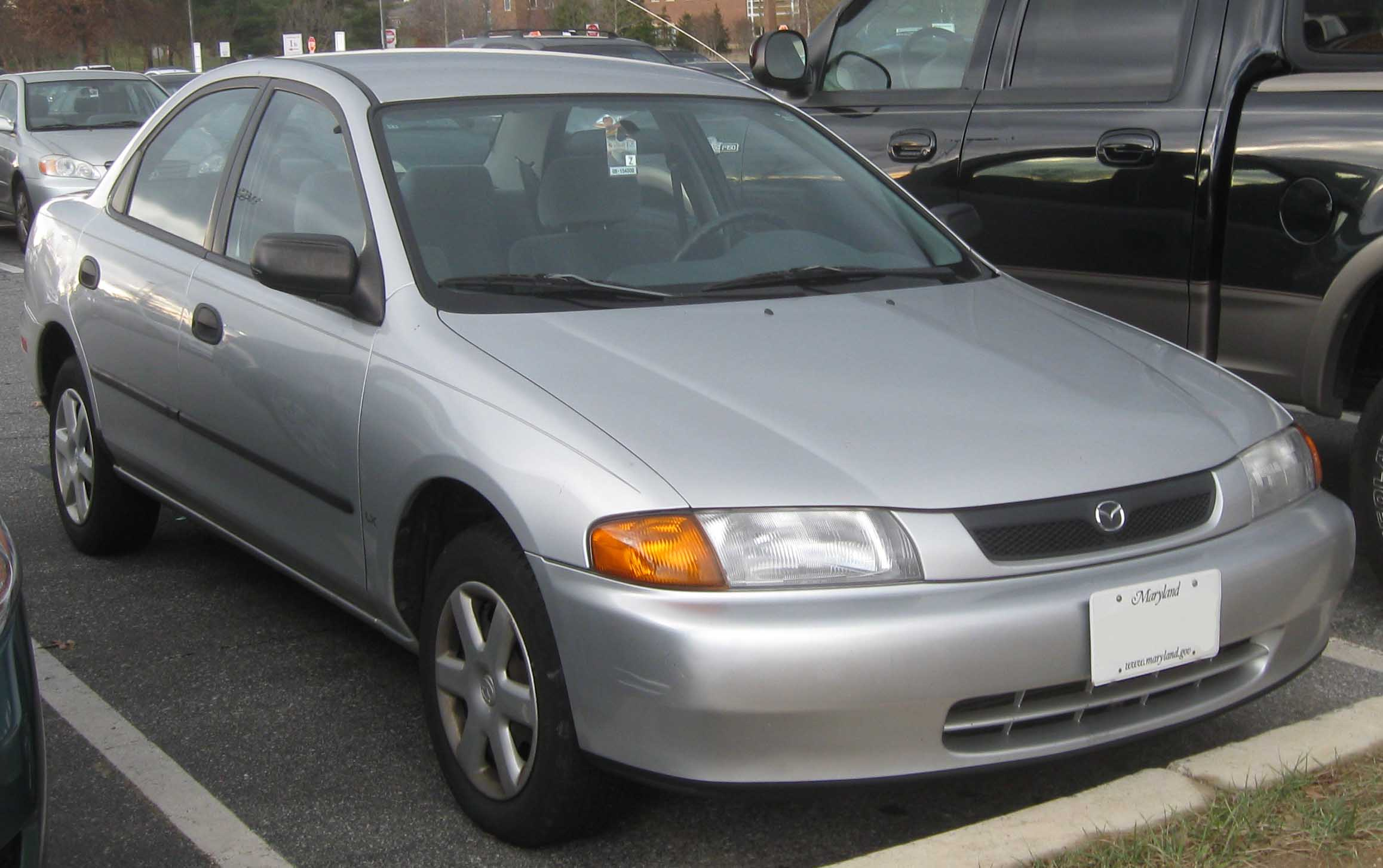
1997–1998 Mazda Protegé sedan (US) with 1997 Mazda's logo

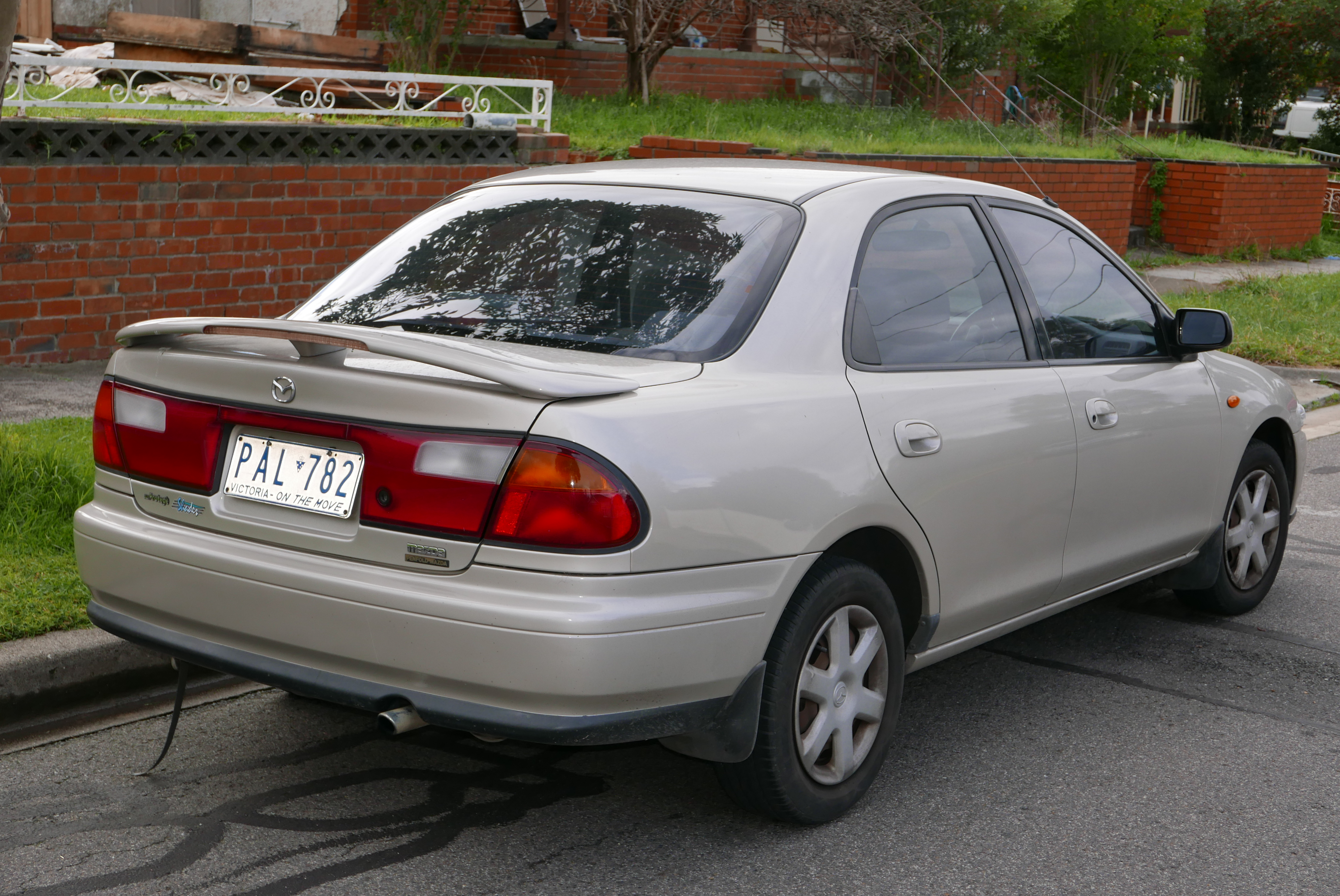
1997–1998 Mazda 323 Protegé saloon (Australia) with brighter rear garnish and 1997 Mazda's logo

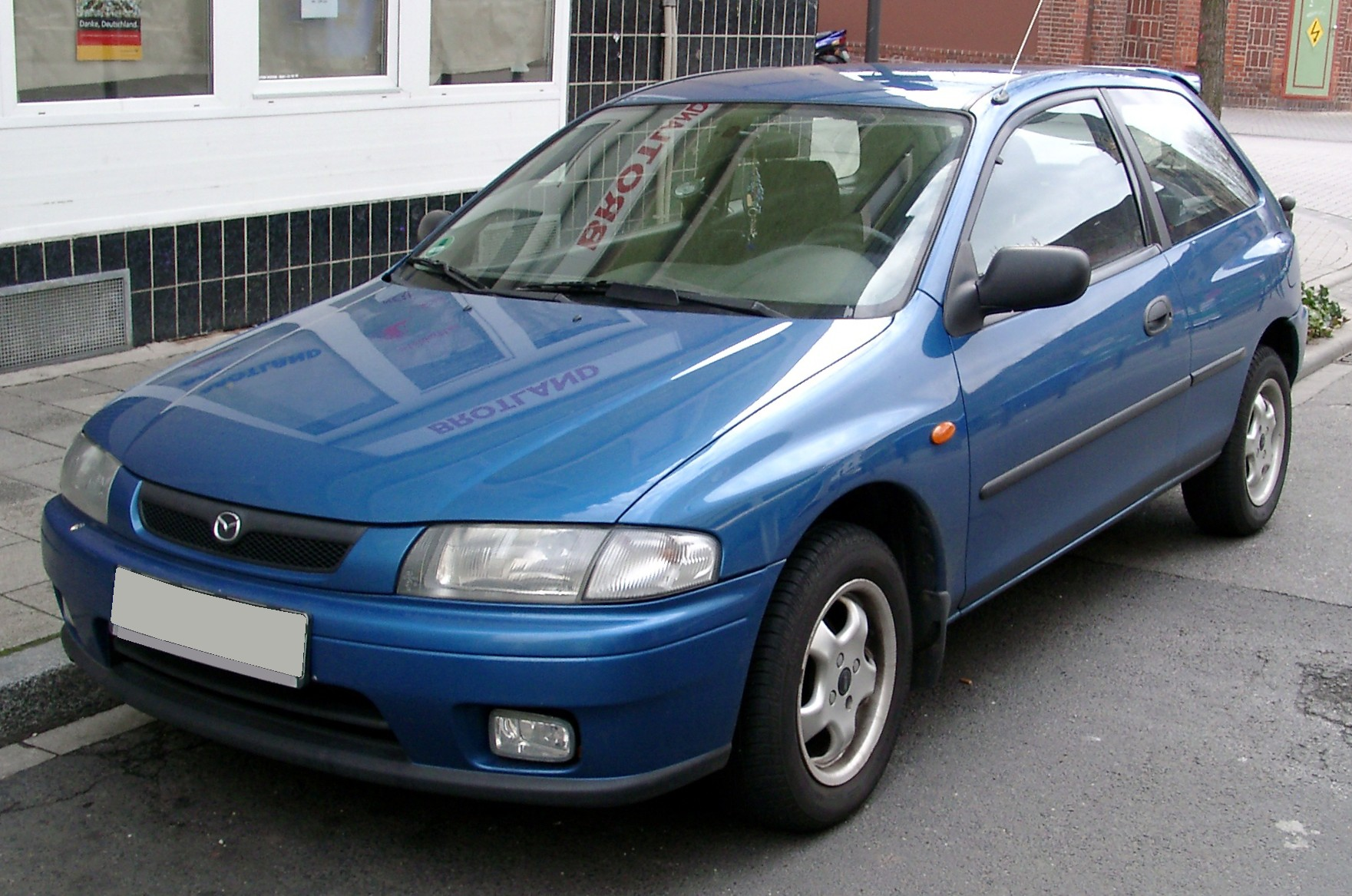
1997–1998 Mazda 323P hatchback (Europe) with 1997 Mazda's logo

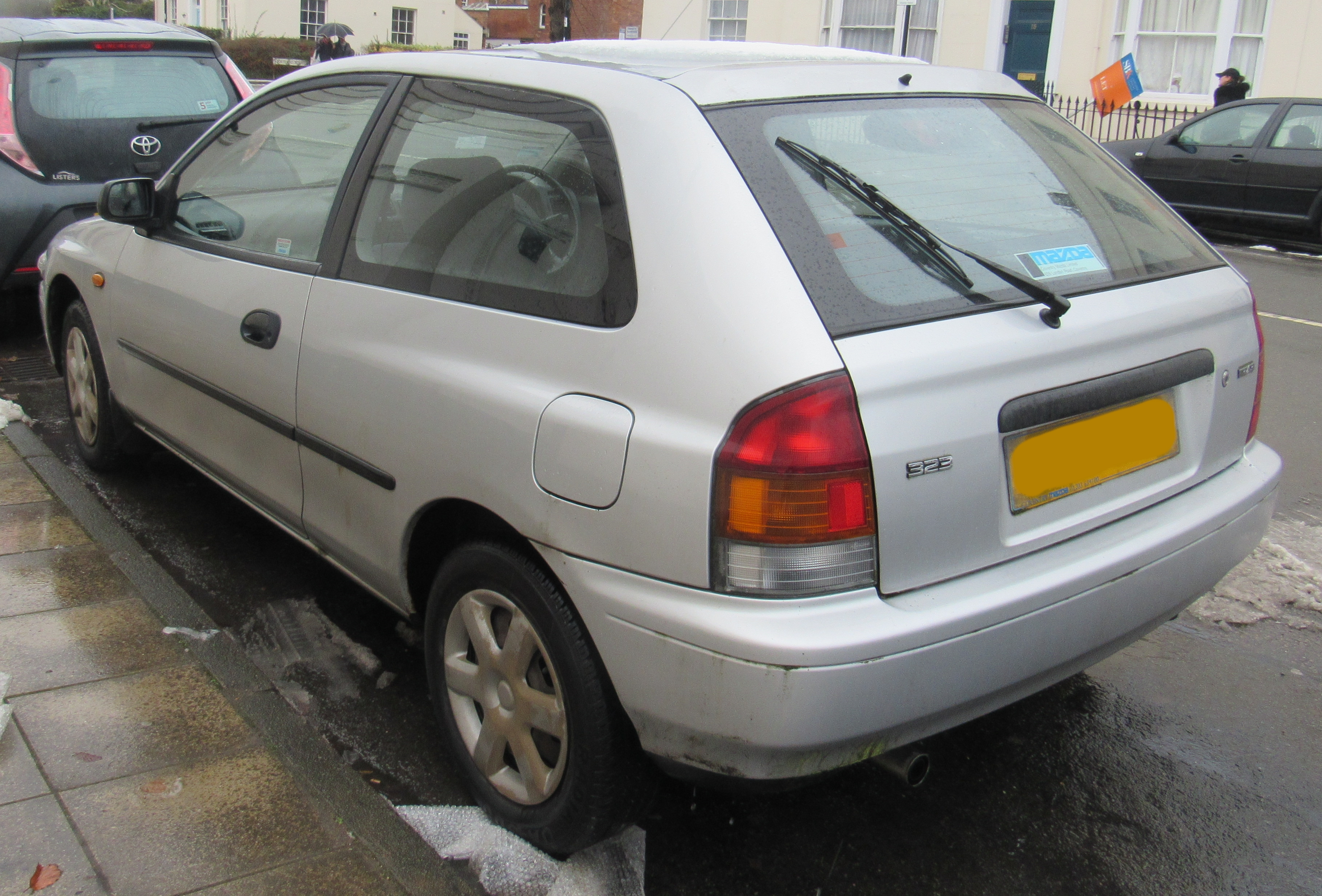
Mazda 323P hatchback (UK)

=== Familia Neo/323C/323 Neo ===
The Familia Neo started production for the Japanese domestic market in 1994 (axed in 1996), and was also sold as the 323C in Europe and the 323 in Canada. Ford released a rebadged version which was mechanically the same although different bumpers, headlights and bonnet were fitted, badged as the Ford Laser Lynx in Japan and Australia, and the Ford Aztec in Taiwan. This model was only available as the Ford Laser Lynx in the Australian market, as Mazda already had the 323 Astina Hatch filling the gap for a hatchback in the Mazda range. To contradict this, Mazda Australia also offered two 323 saloons, the Astina/Lantis hardtop and the 323 Protegé until production of both models ceased in 1998.

It featured a rear hatch with a divided glass, much like the Honda CR-X. Aesthetically the Familia Neo was very close in looks to a Mazda Lantis/323F and equated to a three-door version and also shared the Lantis suspension. The top specced Familia Neo was fitted with a DOHC 1839 cc BP-ZE engine which produced around 114–135 PS (84–99 kW) (depending on the market), and this was the same engine fitted to the base model Mazda Lantis. It was also sold for a single year (1995) in Canada as 323 GS. In Europe it was named Mazda 323C (for coupé), available for sale until September 1998 and it was equipped with 1.3 L SOHC, 1.5 L DOHC 16V, and 1.8 L DOHC 16V engine.

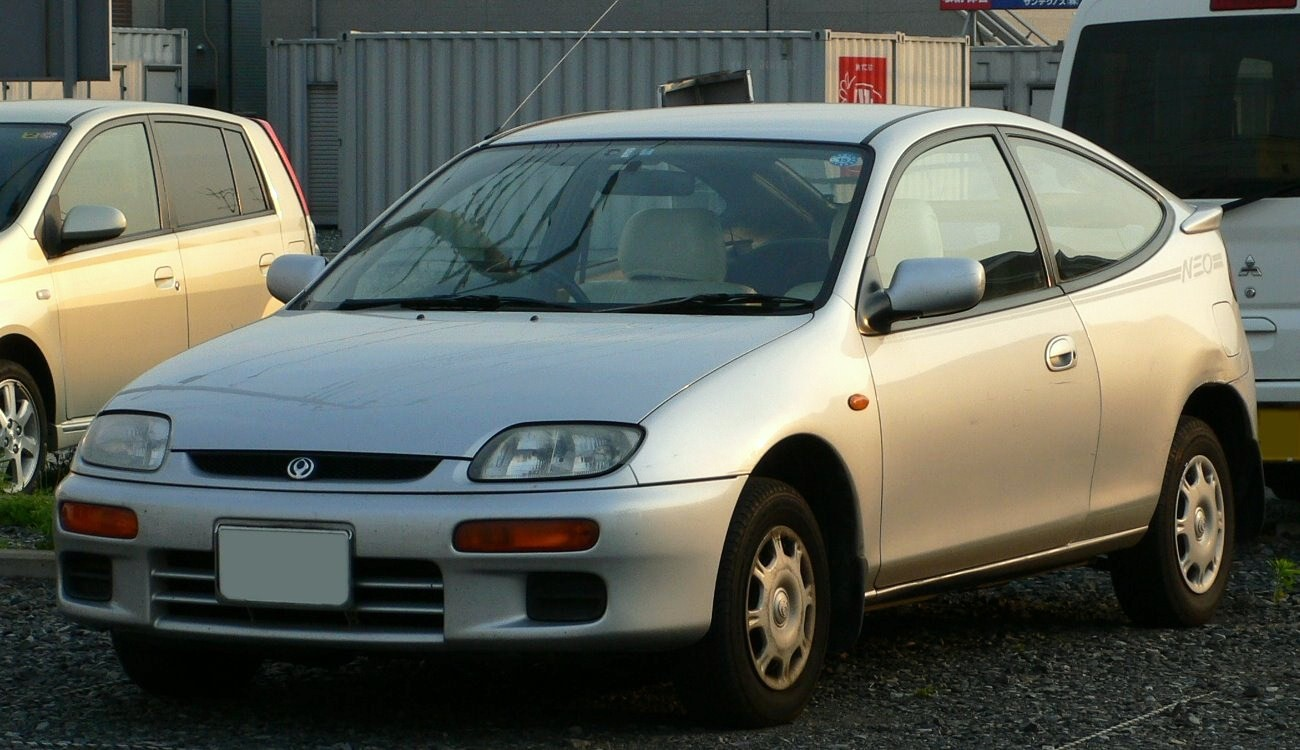
Mazda Familia Neo coupé (Japan)

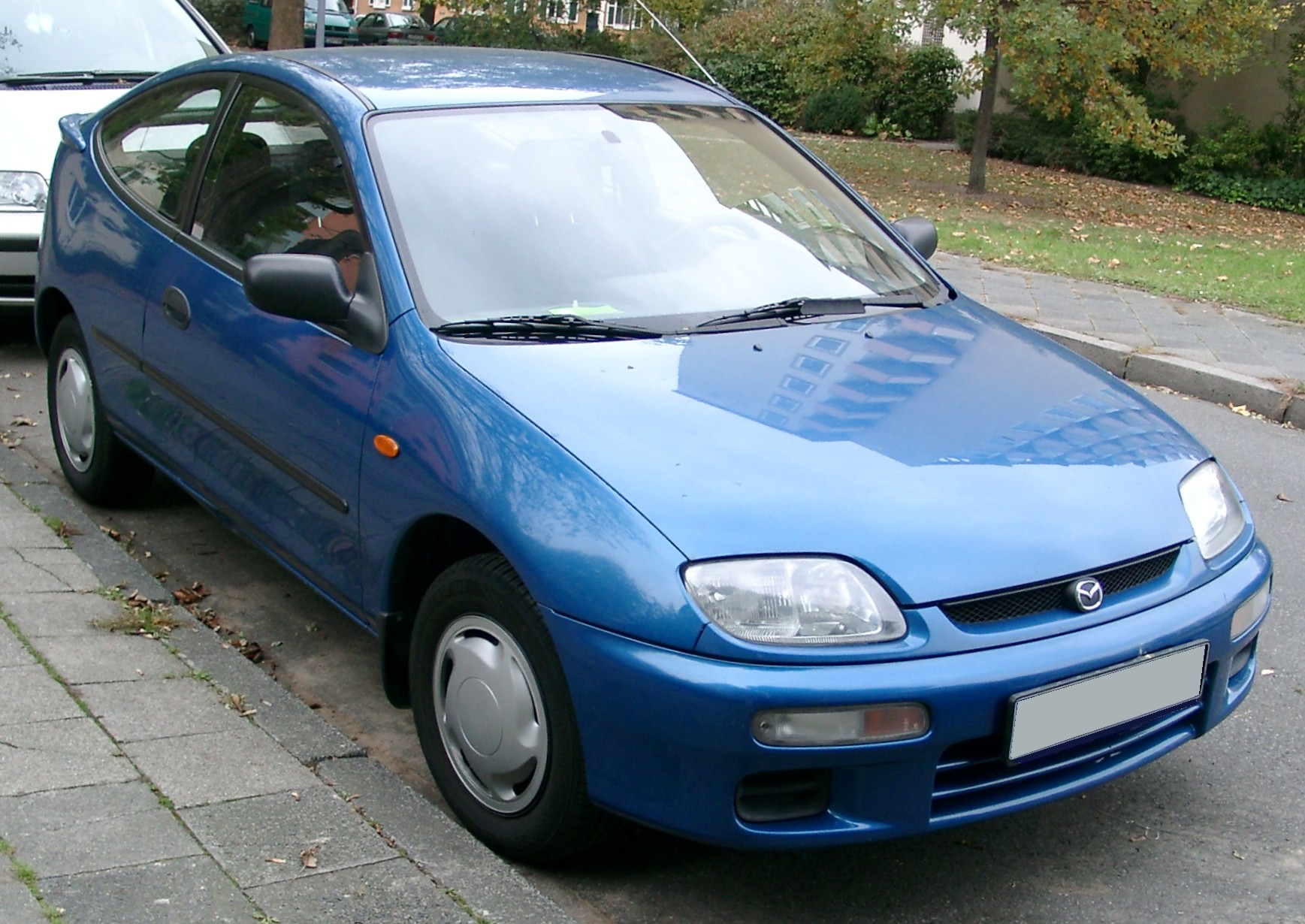
Mazda 323C coupé (Europe)

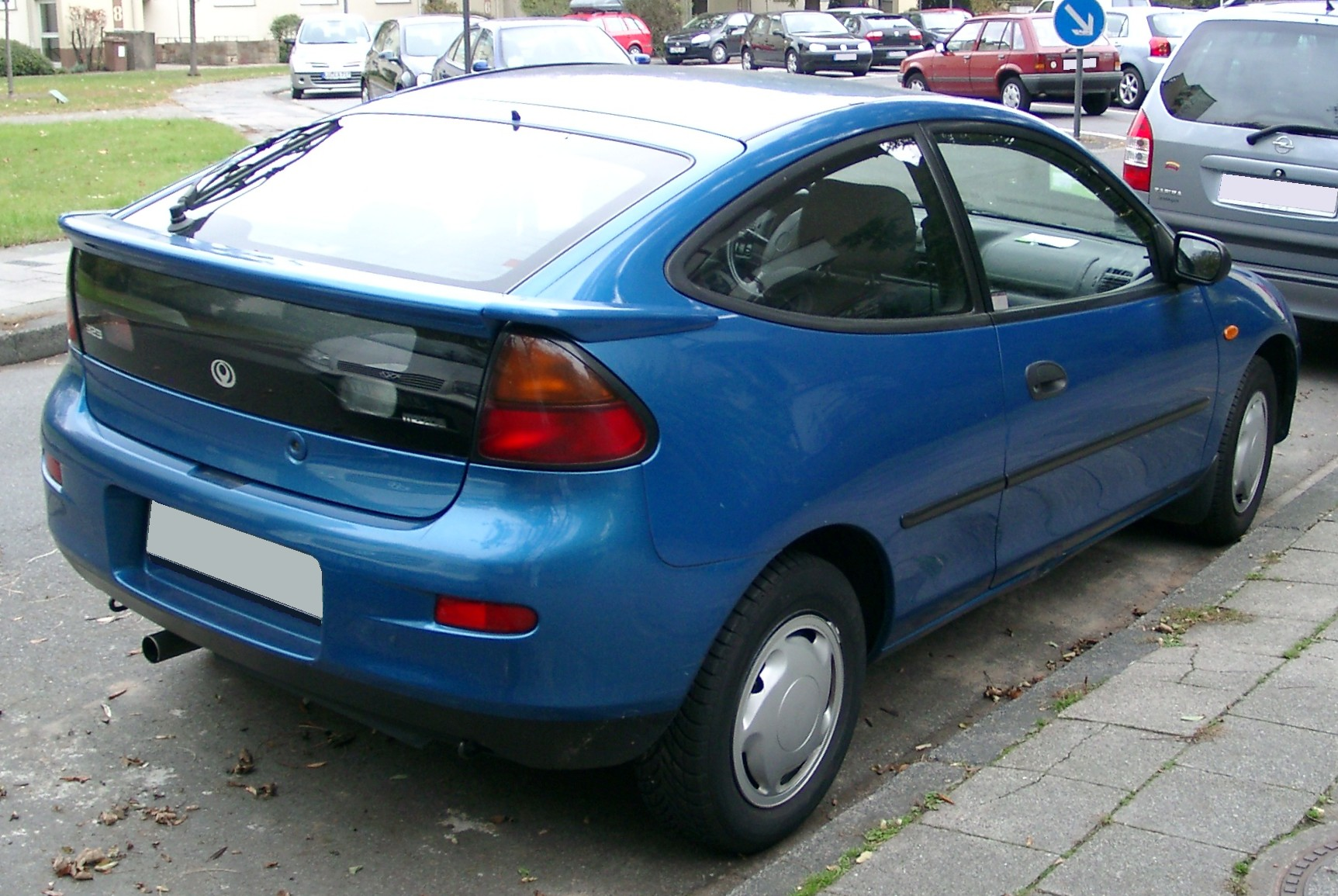
Mazda 323C coupé (Europe)

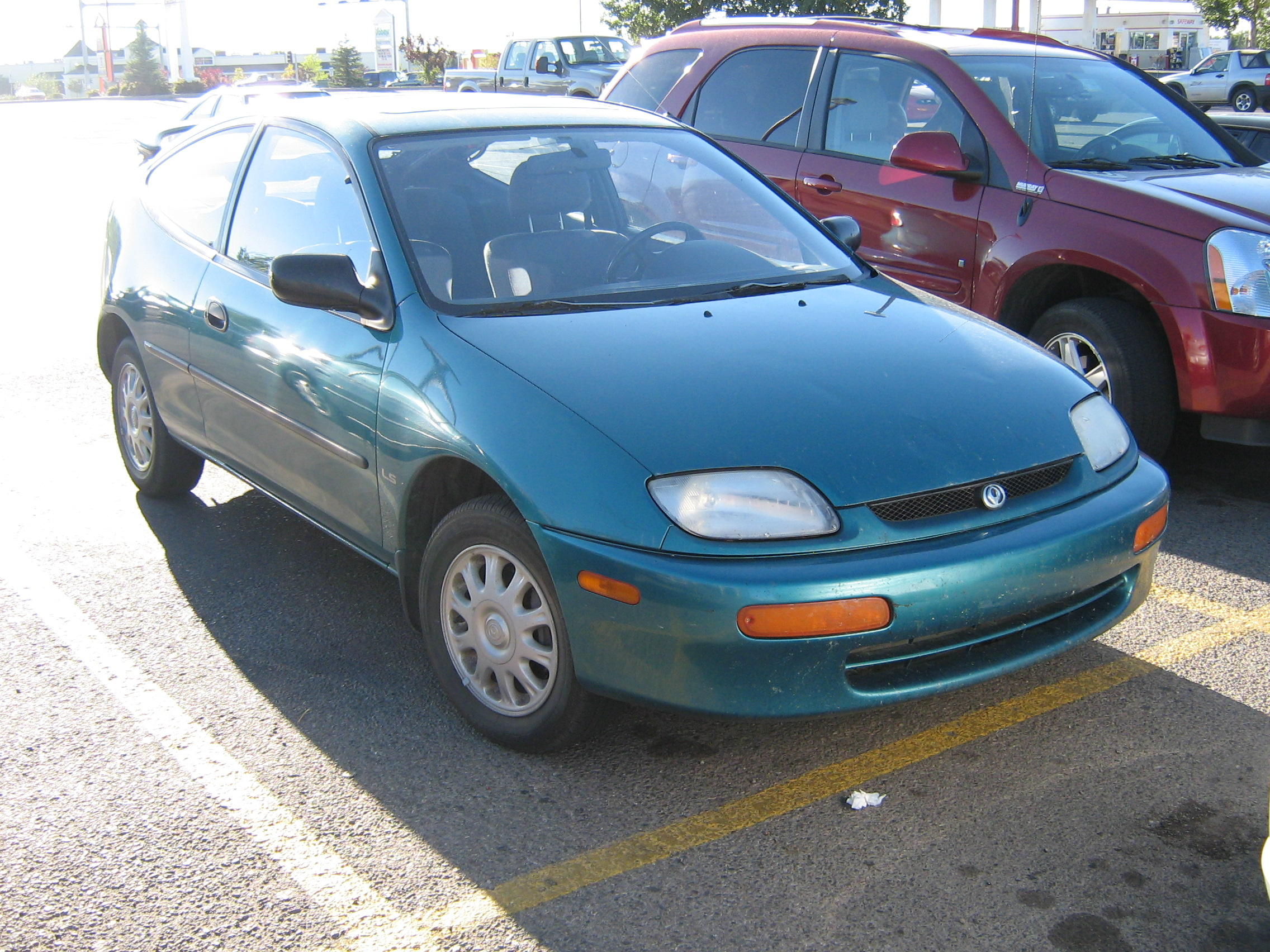
Mazda 323 (Canada)

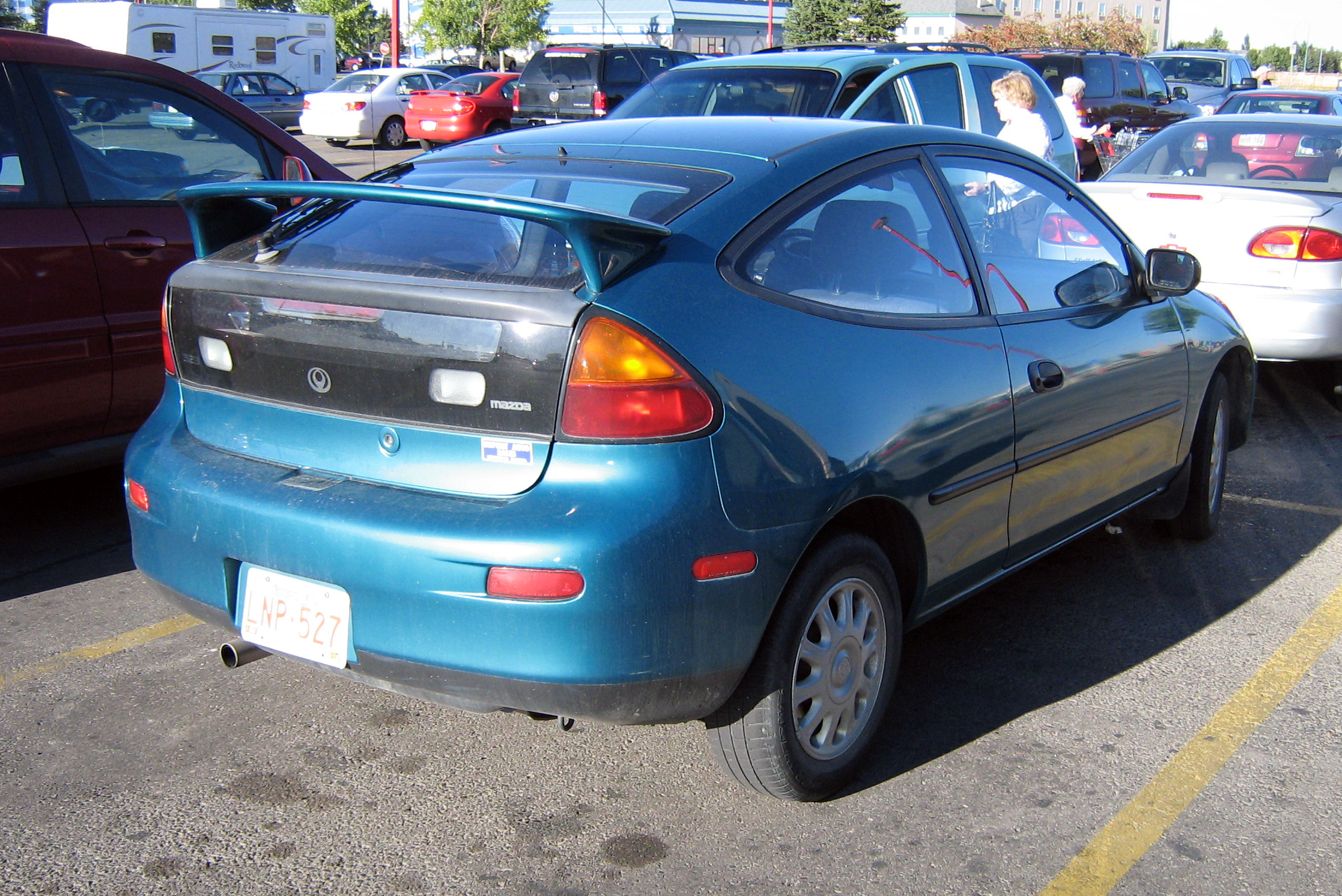
Mazda 323 (Canada)

Engines

Petrol:

- 1.3 L (1,323 cc) B3-ME, I4 16-valve SOHC, FI, 73–84 PS (54–62 kW; 72–83 hp) / 104–110 N⋅m (77–81 lb⋅ft) (1994–2000)
- 1.5 L (1,489 cc) Z5-DE, I4 16-valve DOHC, FI, 88–110 PS (65–81 kW; 87–108 hp) / 130–137 N⋅m (96–101 lb⋅ft) (1994–2000)
- 1.5 L (1,489 cc) Z5-DEL, I4 16-valve DOHC, FI, lean burn, 94 PS (69 kW; 93 hp) / 132 N⋅m (97 lb⋅ft) (1996–1998)
- 1.5 L (1,498 cc) B5-ZE, I4 16-valve DOHC, FI, 125 PS (92 kW; 123 hp) / 129 N⋅m (95 lb⋅ft) (1994–1996)
- 1.6 L (1,597 cc) B6D, I4 16-valve DOHC, FI, 115 PS (85 kW; 113 hp) / 140 N⋅m (103 lb⋅ft) (1996–1998)
- 1.8 L (1,839 cc) BP-ZE, I4 16-valve DOHC, FI, 114–140 PS (84–103 kW; 112–138 hp) / 157–163 N⋅m (116–120 lb⋅ft) (1995–2000)

Diesel:

- 1.7 L (1,686 cc) 4EE1-T, I4 8-valve SOHC, turbo-diesel, 82–88 PS (60–65 kW; 81–87 hp) / 167–168 N⋅m (123–124 lb⋅ft) (1995–1998)
- 2.0 L (1,998 cc) RF, I4 8-valve SOHC, 71 PS (52 kW; 70 hp) / 128 N⋅m (94 lb⋅ft) (1996–1999)

=== Lantis/Astina/323F ===
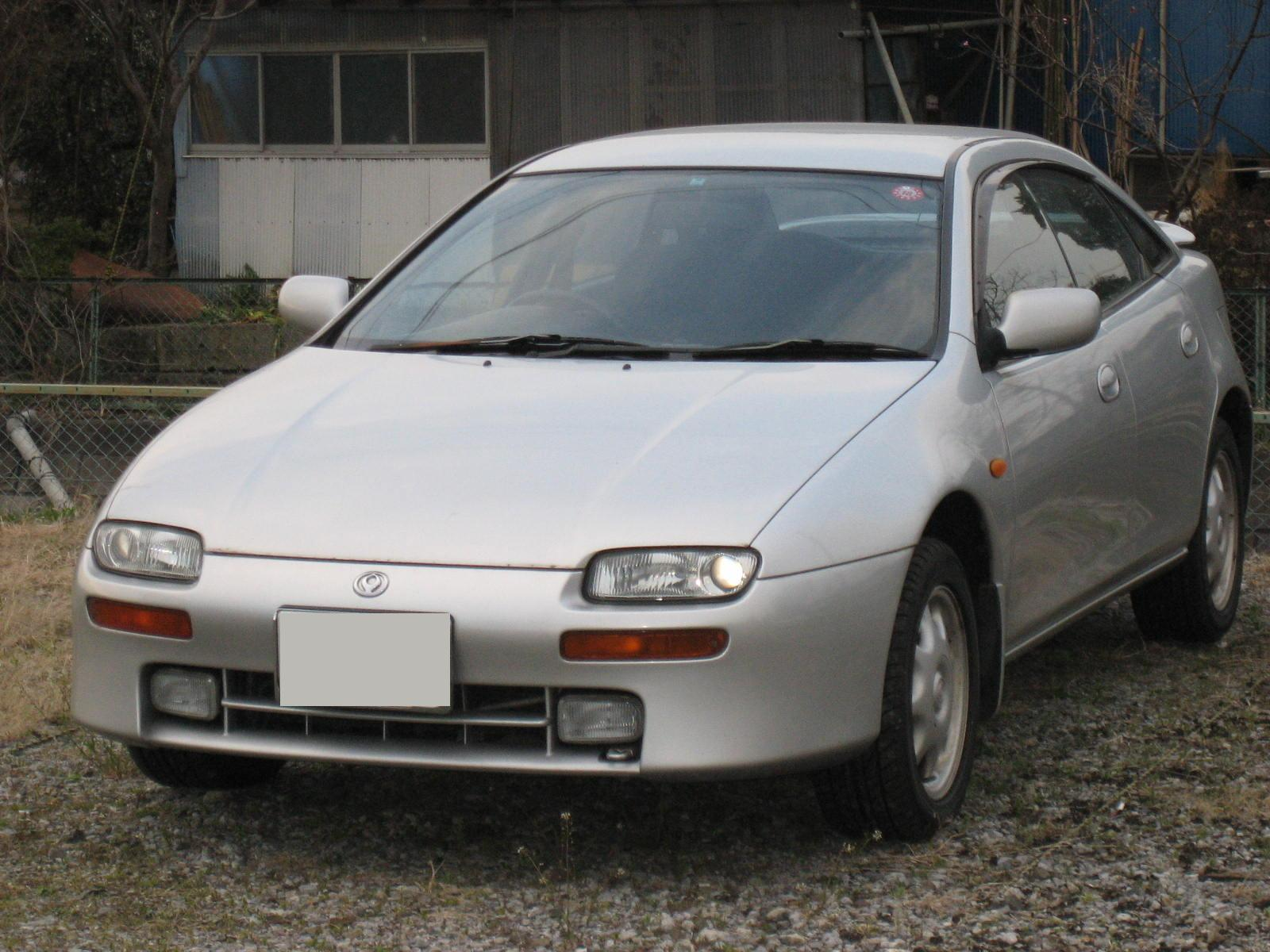
Mazda Lantis 5-door hatchback (Japan)

A five-door hatchback and four-door saloon, both featuring pillarless doors and distinct sheetmetal from other 323s, was sold in Japan as the Mazda Lantis, in Australia, New Zealand and South Africa as the Mazda 323 Astina, in Colombia as the Mazda Allegro and in Europe as the Mazda 323F.

They were built on platforms distinct from the other 323s and actually appeared nearly a year before the new Familia, in September 1993. The bodyshape was designed by former Porsche designers. The Lantis was on the CB, a minor update of the CA that underpinned the luxury Mazda Xedos 6 and Eunos 500. The European 323F was designated BA, but was actually almost identical to the CB, and had little to do with other B platforms. These models were sold with the 1.5 L 1.6L and 1.8 L engines seen in the rest of the 323 range, as well as a 2.0 L (KF) V6 shared with the Eunos 500. The 2.0L V6 still remains one of the smallest V6 engines put into a production car.

== Ninth generation (BJ; 1998) ==
Ninth generation (BJ)
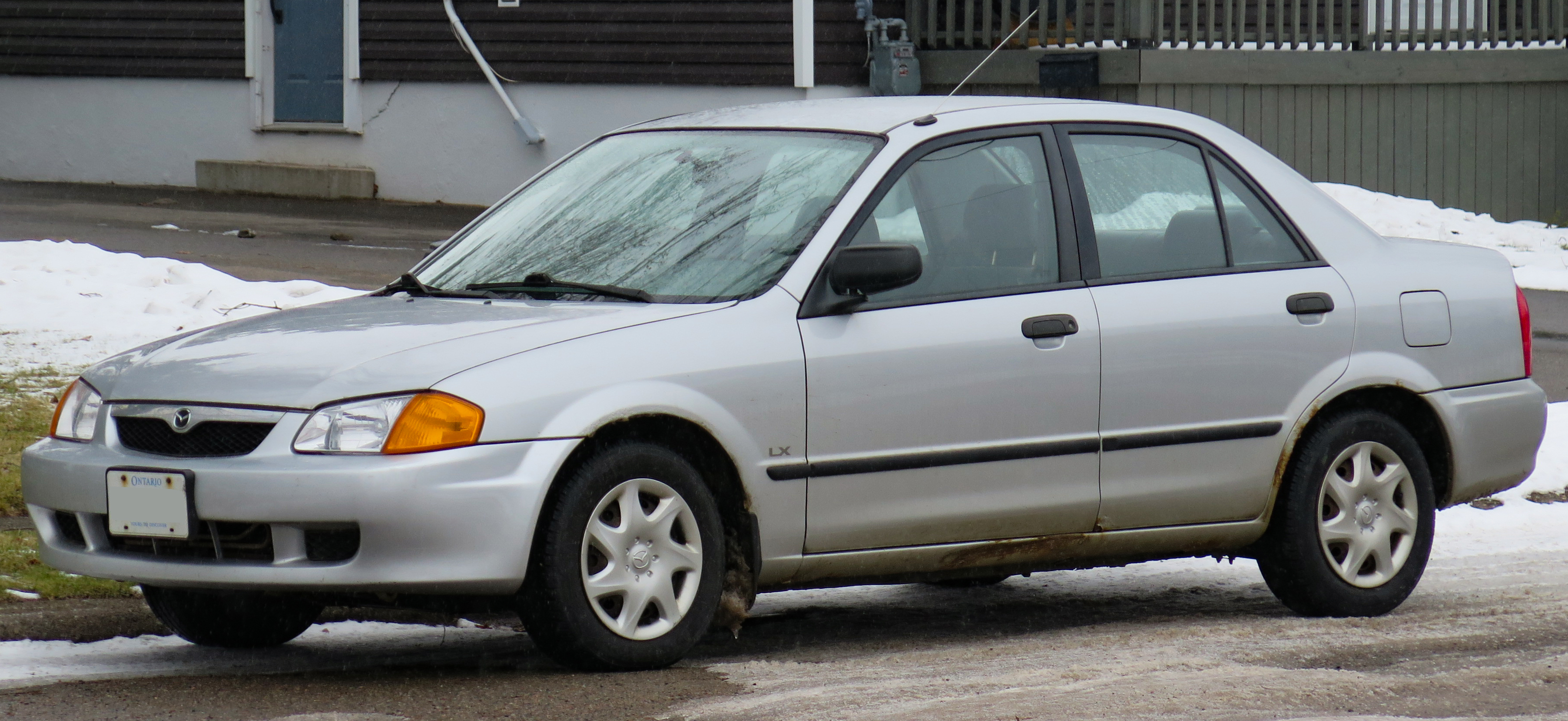
- 1999 Mazda Protegé LX (Canada; pre-facelift)

Overview
- Also called: Mazda 323; Mazda Protegé; Mazda Protegé5; Mazda Isamu Genki (Taiwan); Mazda Allegro; Mazda Etude (South Africa); Ford Activa; Ford Lynx; Ford Laser (KN/KQ); Ford Tierra; Haima Family (China); Haima Happin (China)
- Production: 1998–2003; 2003–2008 (Colombia, Iran, Taiwan); 2003–2013 (China)
- Assembly: Japan: Hōfu; South Africa: Pretoria; Colombia: Bogotá (CCA); Venezuela: Valencia; Iran: Tehran (Bahman); Indonesia: Jakarta (IRMC); Malaysia: Shah Alam, Selangor; Mexico: Hermosillo (Hermosillo Stamping and Assembly, saloon only); Philippines: Santa Rosa, Laguna; Thailand: Rayong (AAT); Taiwan: Taoyuan City (Ford Lio Ho); United Kingdom: Dagenham (Ford Dagenham, hatchback only); Vietnam: Hai Duong; Zimbabwe: Willowvale (WMMI)
- Designer: Tsutomu Toyoda (1996)

Body and chassis
- Body style: 4-door saloon; 5-door hatchback; 5-door wagon (Nissan Wingroad based)
- Layout: Front-engine, front-wheel-drive
- Platform: Mazda BJ platform
- Related: Haima 3 Hafei Saibao III

Powertrain
- Engine: Petrol: 1.3 L B3-ME SOHC I4; 1.5 L ZL-DE DOHC I4; 1.5 L ZL-VE S-VT I4; 1.6 L ZM-DE DOHC I4; 1.8 L FP-DE DOHC I4; 2.0 L FS-DE DOHC I4; 2.0 L FS-DET turbo DOHC I4; Diesel: 2.0 L RF TD I4; China: 1.3 L HA-1.3 I4 (Haima Happin); 1.5 L HA-VVT-1.5 I4 (Haima Happin); 1.6 L HM479Q-BA I4 (Haima Happin); 1.6 L 4G18 I4 (Haima Happin); 1.6 L HA-VVT-1.6 I4 (Haima Family); 1.6 L Tritec I4 (Haima Family)
- Transmission: 4-speed F-4EAT automatic; 4-speed 4F27E automatic; 5-speed manual; CVT (China)

Dimensions
- Wheelbase: 2,610 mm (102.8 in)
- Length: 1999–2000 Protegé: 174.0 in (4,420 mm); 2001–03 Protegé: 175.3 in (4,453 mm); Protegé5: 170.5 in (4,331 mm); 2001–03: 4,265 mm (167.9 in); 1999–2000: 4,215 mm (165.9 in); 2001–03 Saloon, 2004–2011 Haima Happin: 4,365 mm (171.9 in); 1999–2000 Saloon: 4,315 mm (169.9 in); Mazdaspeed & MP3: 4,435 mm (174.6 in); Haima Family 2006–2010: 4,466 mm (175.8 in)
- Width: 1,705 mm (67.1 in) (Int'l); 1,695 mm (66.7 in) (Japan, 2007–2012 Haima Happin, 2010 Haima Family)
- Height: Saloon: 1,410 mm (55.5 in); Hatchback: 1,470 mm (57.9 in); Mazdaspeed & MP3: 55.3 in (1,405 mm); 1,425 mm (56.1 in) (Haima Happin 2012)

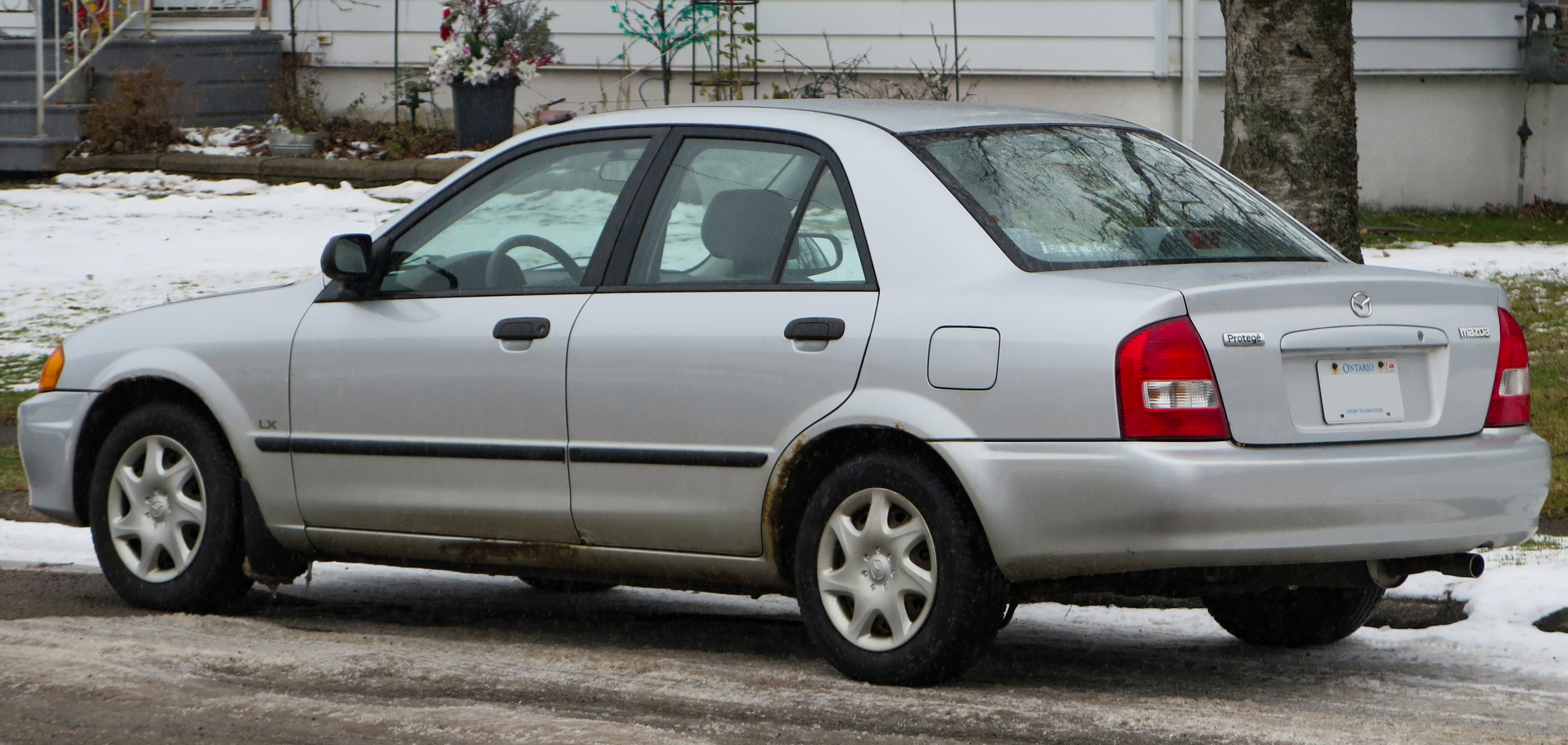
1999 Mazda Protegé LX (Canada; pre-facelift)

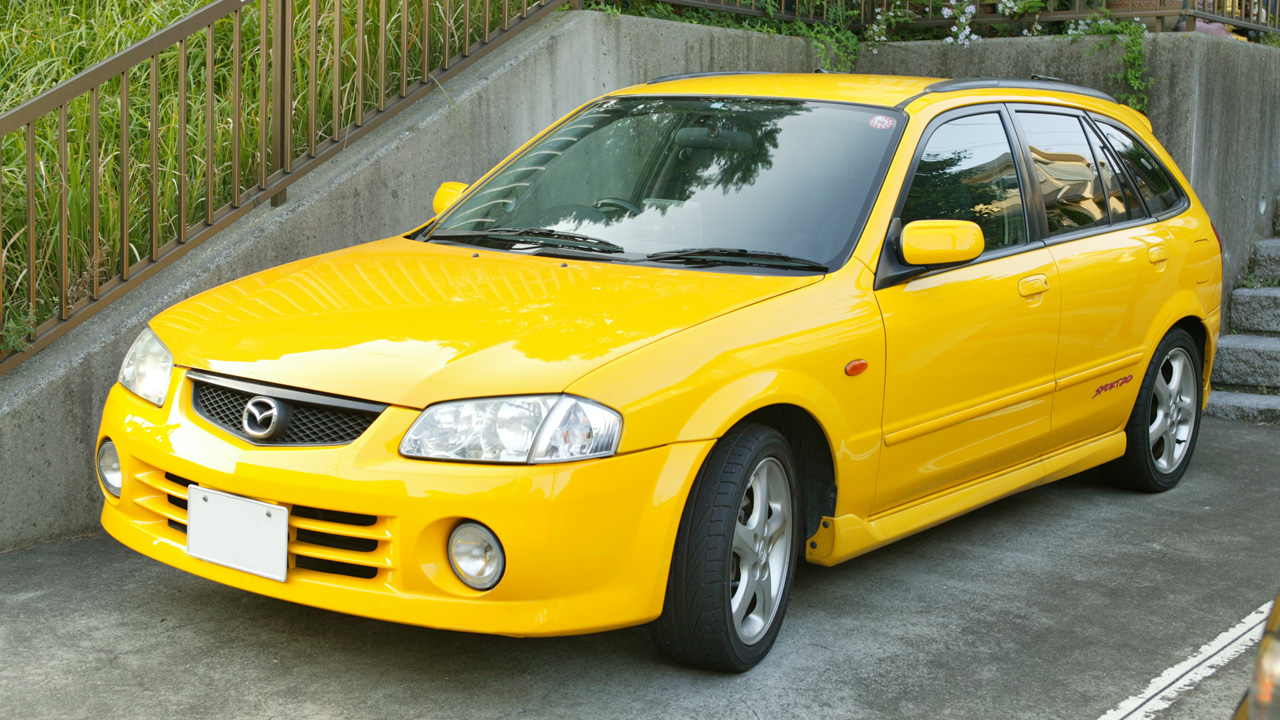
Mazda Familia Sport 20 (Japan)

The ninth generation BJ Familia was introduced on 9 June 1998 and released on 29 September 1998 as a 1999 model. Body styles included a four-door saloon and a five-door S-Wagon (sold as the Protegé5 in the United States and Canada, 323F in Europe, and as the Astina NU in some Asian countries). In Japan there was also a traditional five-door light van (station wagon for commercial use) sold under the Familia nameplate, but this car was simply a rebadged Nissan. A 4EC automatic transmission and two five-speed manual transmissions were available. All-wheel drive is optional.

The Japanese Mazda Familia had all-wheel drive as an option. In North America, the ES's engine was still 1.8 liters, but for the eighth generation it was a smaller version of the 626's engine (the FP) rather than the sportier engine shared with the Miata which had been used previously. The rear disc brakes of the ES were downgraded to drums.

Mazda 323s were used as police cars by some police departments such as the Singapore Police Force as Fast Response Cars (FRCs) until they were retired in 2016.

The Familia Van and Familia Business Wagon were introduced for 2000, and continued to be supplied by Nissan under an OEM deal, based on the Nissan AD.

=== Facelift ===
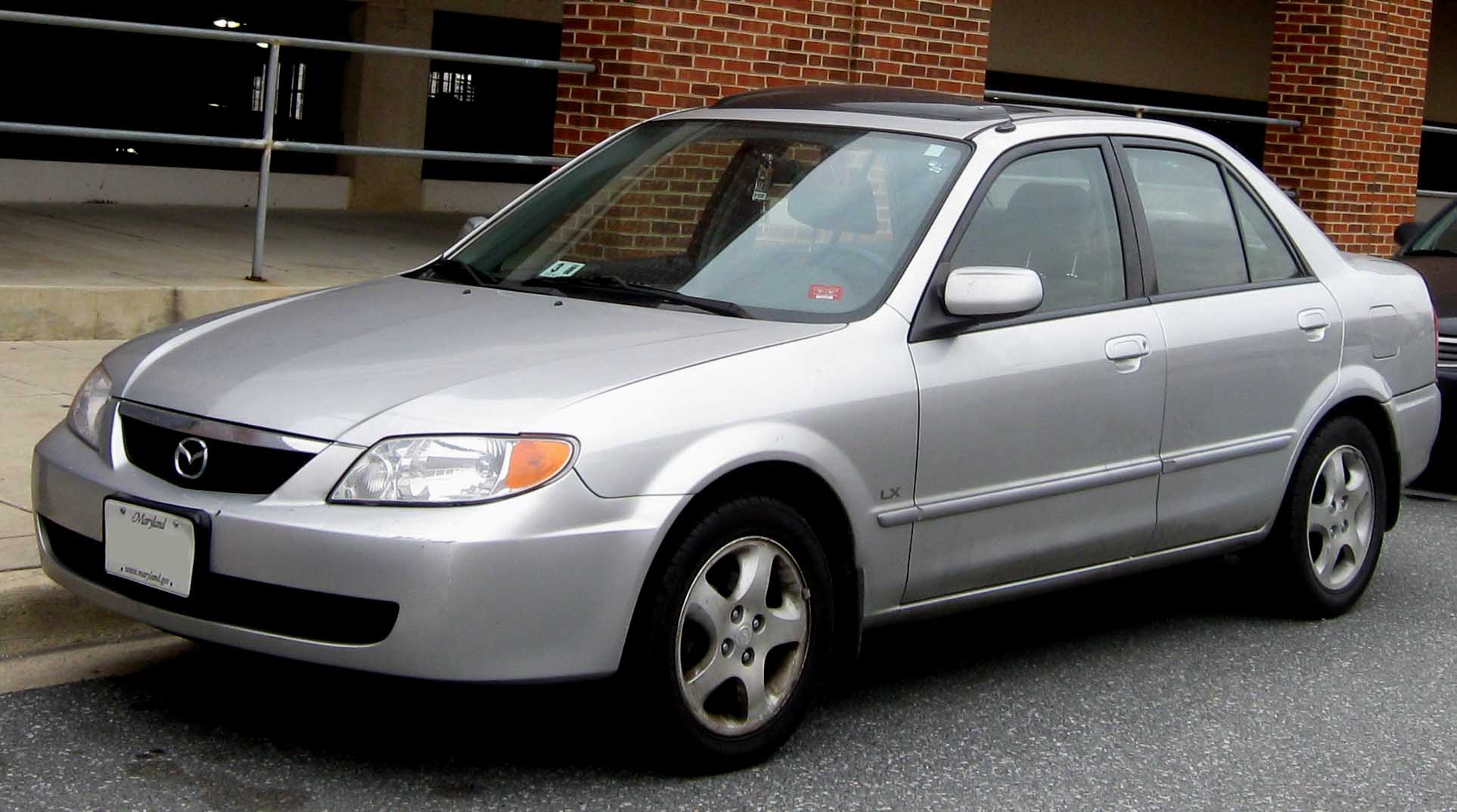
2001–2003 Mazda Protegé LX saloon (US)

In 2001, the entire line was facelifted with new styling, a revised suspension, and a new audio system. For North America, ES models received rear disc brakes and a stiffer suspension. The 1.8 L engine was increased to 2.0 L for the ES models, and was optional on the LX model, becoming the 2.0LX. The standard 2001 Protegé LX engine was the carryover 1.6 L ZM-DE.

A 2.0-litre, petrol engine appeared in 2001 on the Japanese market Sport 20. In 1999, Ford of Japan ceased to market Mazda-based models, and the Ford Laser, along with the Ixion, Telstar, and Festiva, was discontinued.

=== Mazdaspeed Editions ===
==== Mazdaspeed Familia ====
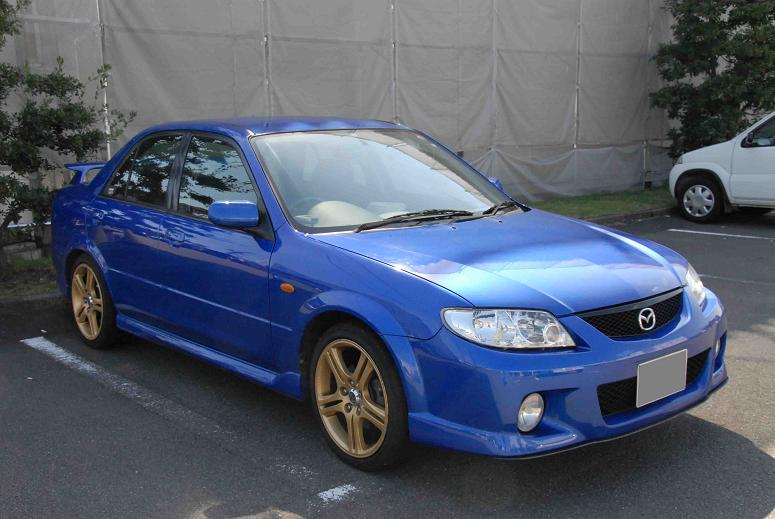
Mazdaspeed Familia

In May 2001, Mazda introduced the special edition, the Mazdaspeed Familia. It was only offered on saloon model. Powered by a tuned FS-ZE which was upgraded to 174 hp (130 kW; 176 PS) and a 5-speed manual transmission. It comes equipped with exclusive features such as a large aero bumper, side air dam skirts, and a three-stay rear wing, Mazdaspeed 4-2-1 headers with matching header back exhaust and gold painted 17-inch Racing Hart wheels.

The suspension is also unique to the Mazdaspeed Familia. The damper damping force characteristics have been revised to match the spring rate, and the ride height has been lowered by 14mm at the front and 13mm at the rear along with larger front and rear sway bars. Initially it was planned that 100 units would be produced, but due to the flood of orders Mazda added an additional 109 units. All 200 units were finished in Starry Blue Mica.

==== Mazdaspeed Protegé ====
For the 2001 model year in North America, Mazda introduced the limited-edition Protegé MP3 featuring a new sport-tuned suspension, 17-inch Racing Hart wheels, and a 10 hp (7 kW) gain for a total of 140 hp (104 kW), which was achieved through a tuned factory ECU which advances ignition timing requiring high octane rating petrol, upgraded rear muffler by Racing Beat, and removal of the Mazda VTCS system. The MP3 also came from the factory with a complete 450-watt Kenwood powered MP3 stereo with 10-inch (250 mm) powered subwoofer. A total of 1,500 were produced – 1,000 finished in blue, and 500 painted yellow.

2001 saw the North American introduction of the hatchback, called Protegé5 with the same 2.0 L engine offering 130 hp (97 kW; 132 PS) / 135 lb⋅ft (183 N⋅m) this year and a slightly revised interior. In 2002, most Protegés (including the 5) received the 2.0 L engine, although the SE in Canada had the 1.6 L.

In 2003, Mazdaspeed introduced the Mazdaspeed Protegé, an update to the Protegé MP3 that had a 170 hp (127 kW; 172 PS) / 160 lb⋅ft (217 N⋅m) turbocharged engine, shared the MP3's full Racing Beat suspension and rear muffler, redesigned 17-inch (430 mm) wheels, larger four-wheel disc brakes, and a Kenwood stereo system that included an amplifier along with a rear-deck mounted 8-inch (200 mm) sub. Mazda then followed with a mid year change dubbed the "2003.5." This model included a different aero-kit, the same 17-inch (430 mm) Racing Hart wheels, but with a darker color, and custom interior pieces. In total, there were 4,500 Mazdaspeed Protegé models produced of which 1,750 were painted Black/Orange for first version and 2,750 of the mid-year model that were finished in Yellow/Titanium/Blue/Silver.

The 2003 ES model received a Tiptronic automatic transmission as an option, as well as a new wheel design appearing on models with the 15-inch (380 mm) alloy rim option. This was also the last year of production for the Protegé.

=== Post-2003 ===
Production ended on 2 October 2003 and the whole Familia line were replaced by the Mazda3 in the same month. The eighth generation Familia continued to be produced by Ford Lio Ho in Taiwan as the "Mazda Isamu Genki" until 2008 (sold as hatch and saloon and with little or no styling differences to the original 1998 production model). It was also badged as the "Ford Activa", which, unlike the Ford Laser, had no styling changes from the 323, except for the badges. In Southeast Asia, a version of the last Laser continued to be assembled in Indonesia, Malaysia, and the Philippines as the Ford Lynx.

This generation remained in production in some South American countries (Ecuador, Colombia, and Venezuela), badged as the Mazda Allegro. Each Allegro keeps in the styling of the last generation 323/Protegé/Astina/Familia. In Colombia, production of the Mazda 323 continued until 2003, built by its local subsidiary, the Compañía Colombiana Automotriz.

Chinese company FAW Haima Automobile Co., Ltd. produces a restyled version of the Familia/323 called Haima Family from 2003 to 2010. It is equipped with a 1.6 L petrol engine mated with a five-speed manual or a four-speed automatic gearbox. Another version called the Haima Happin went on sale from 2008 to 2012 model years with a facelift for 2011 and 2012 models. The Happin was equipped with a 1.3 L, 1.5 L, and 1.6 L engine options and a five-speed manual gearbox.

Engines (includes all models from 1998 to 2003)

- 1.3 L B3-ME SOHC I4
- 1.5 L ZL-DE DOHC I4
- 1.5 L ZL-VE S-VT I4
- 1.6 L ZM-DE DOHC I4
- 1.8 L FP-DE DOHC I4
- 2.0 L FS, 130 hp (97 kW; 132 PS) / 135 lb⋅ft (183 N⋅m)
- 2.0 L FS-ZE (2001 Sport 20)
- 2.0 L RF Diesel

=== Gallery ===
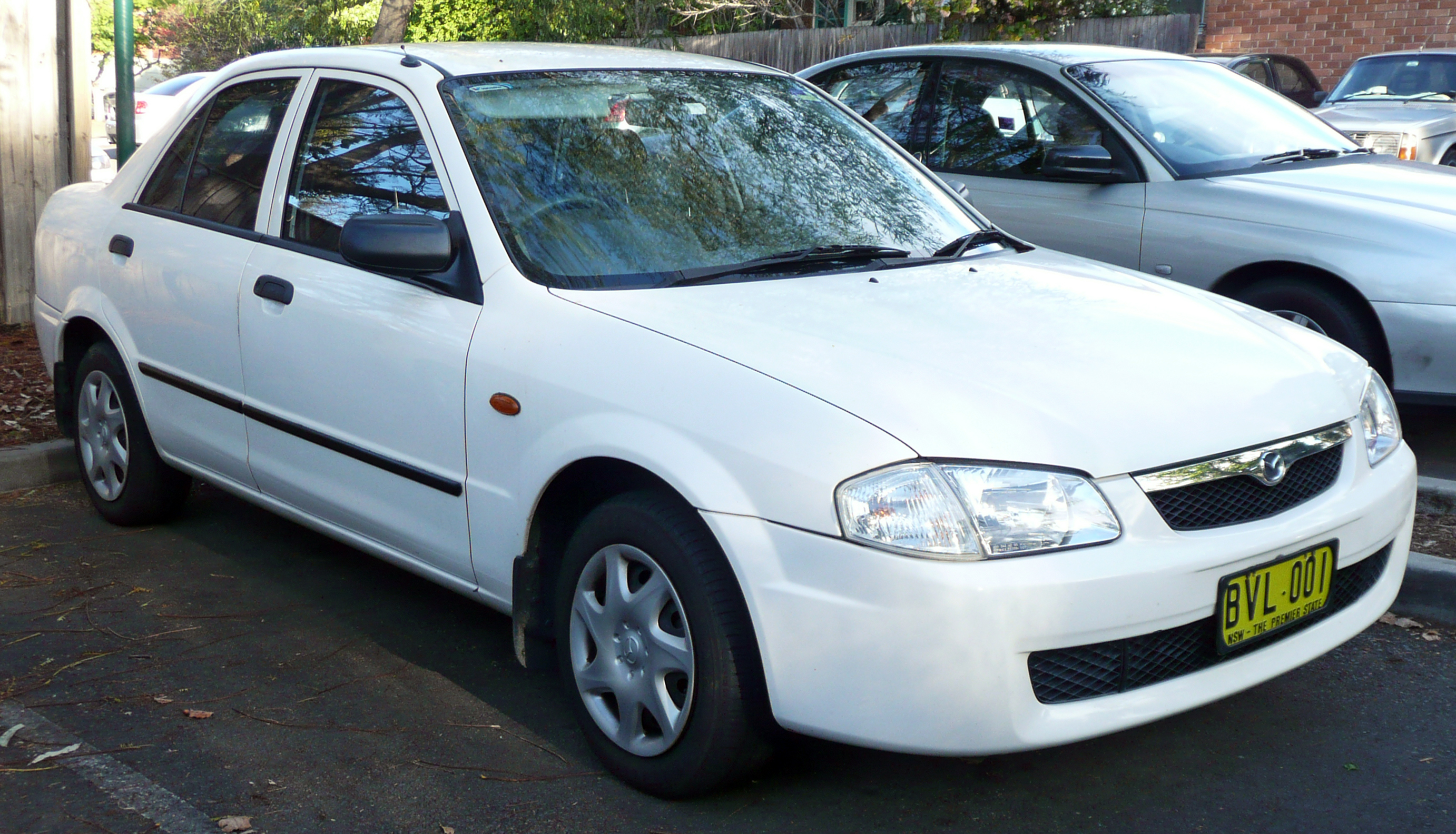
Pre-facelift Mazda 323 Protegé saloon, 1998–2001

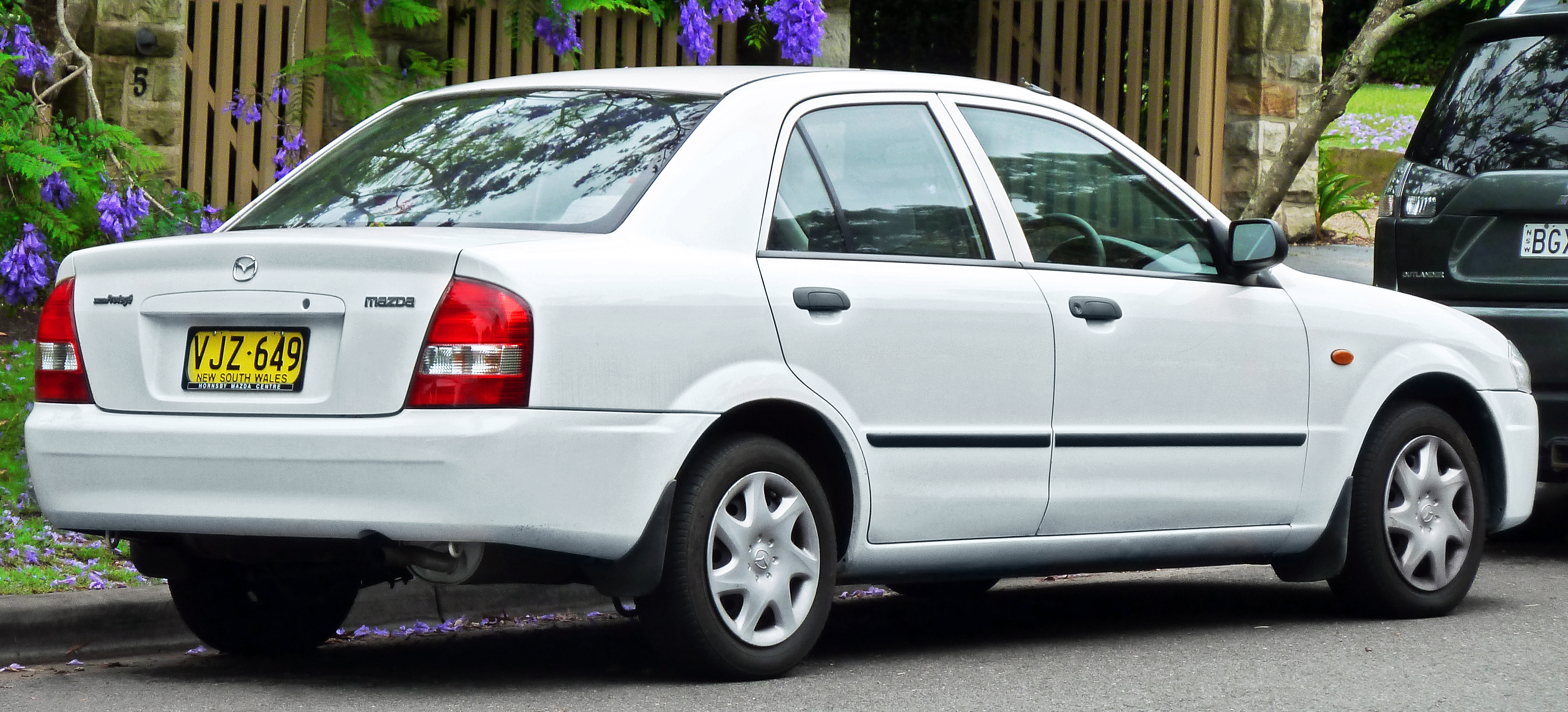
Pre-facelift Mazda 323 Protegé saloon, 1998–2001

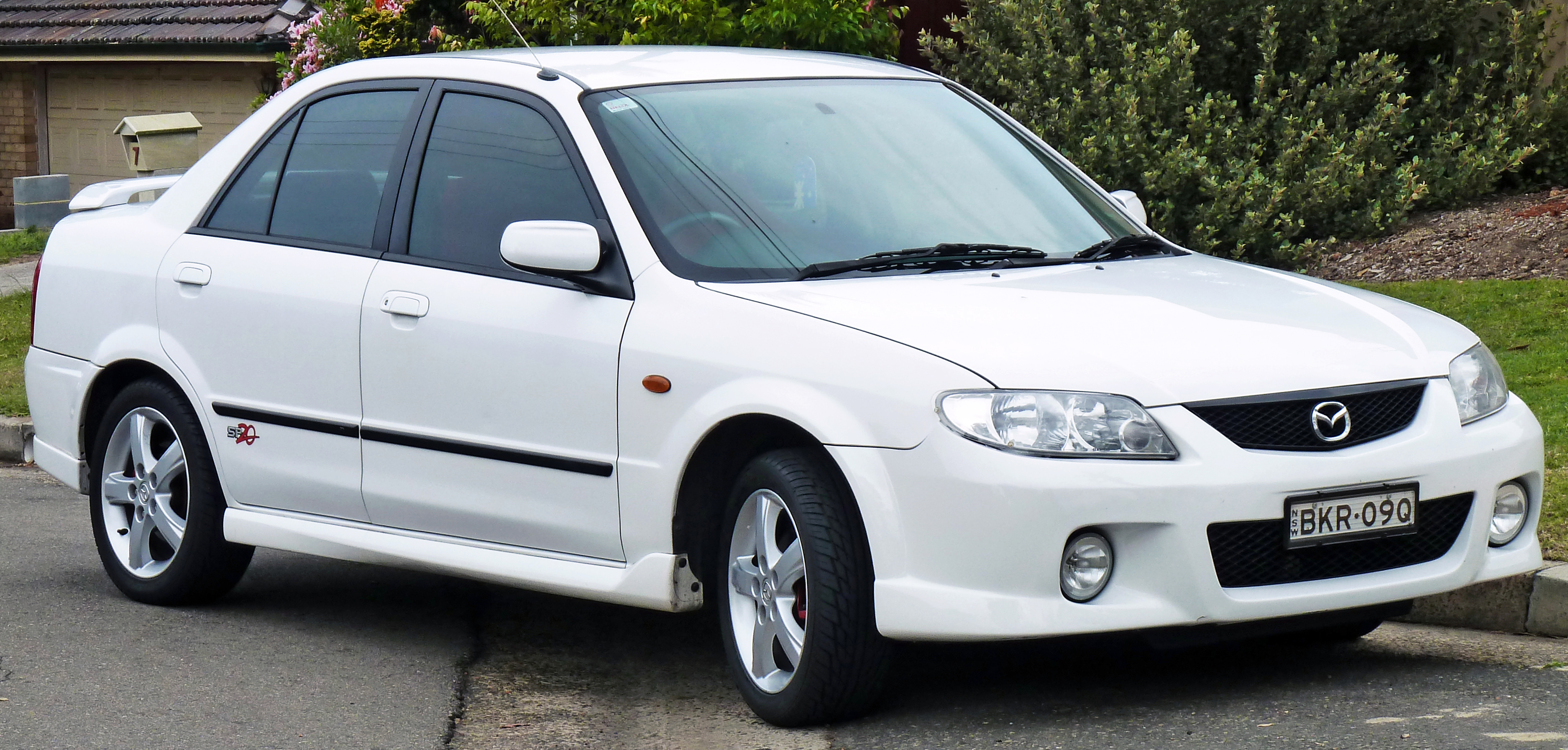
Facelift Mazda 323 Protegé SP20 saloon, 2002–2003

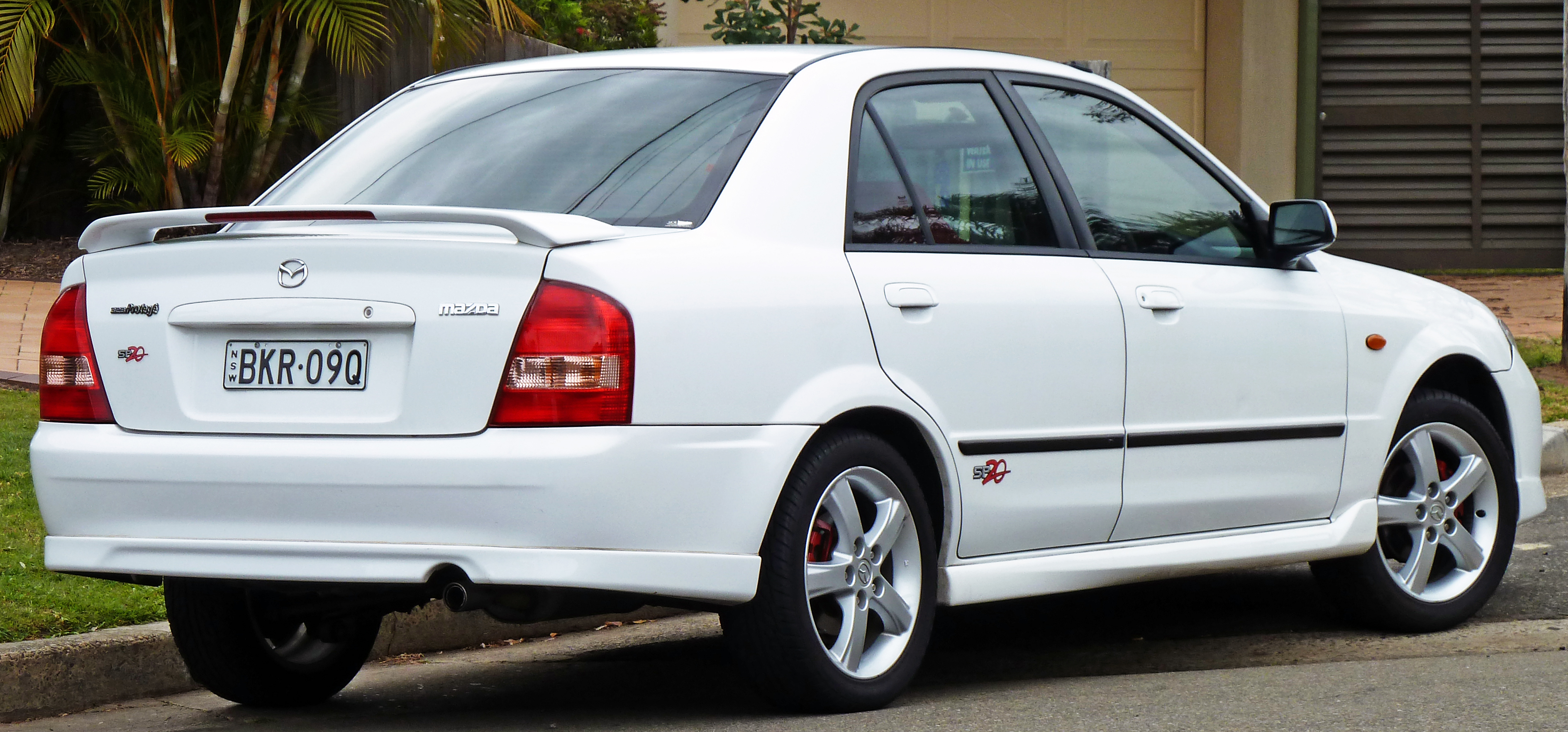
Facelift Mazda 323 Protegé SP20 saloon, 2002–2003

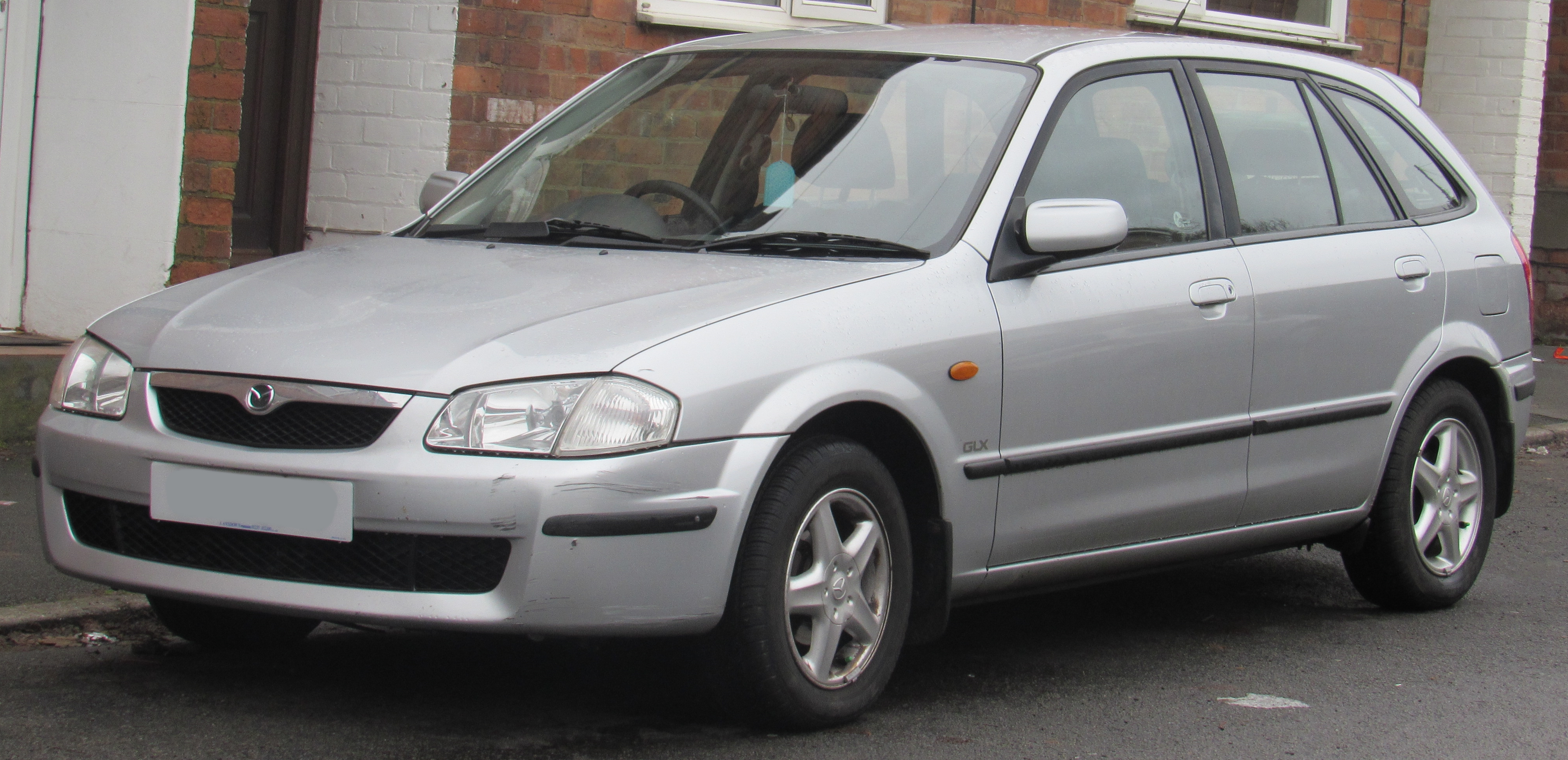
Pre-facelift Mazda 323F hatchback, 1999–2001

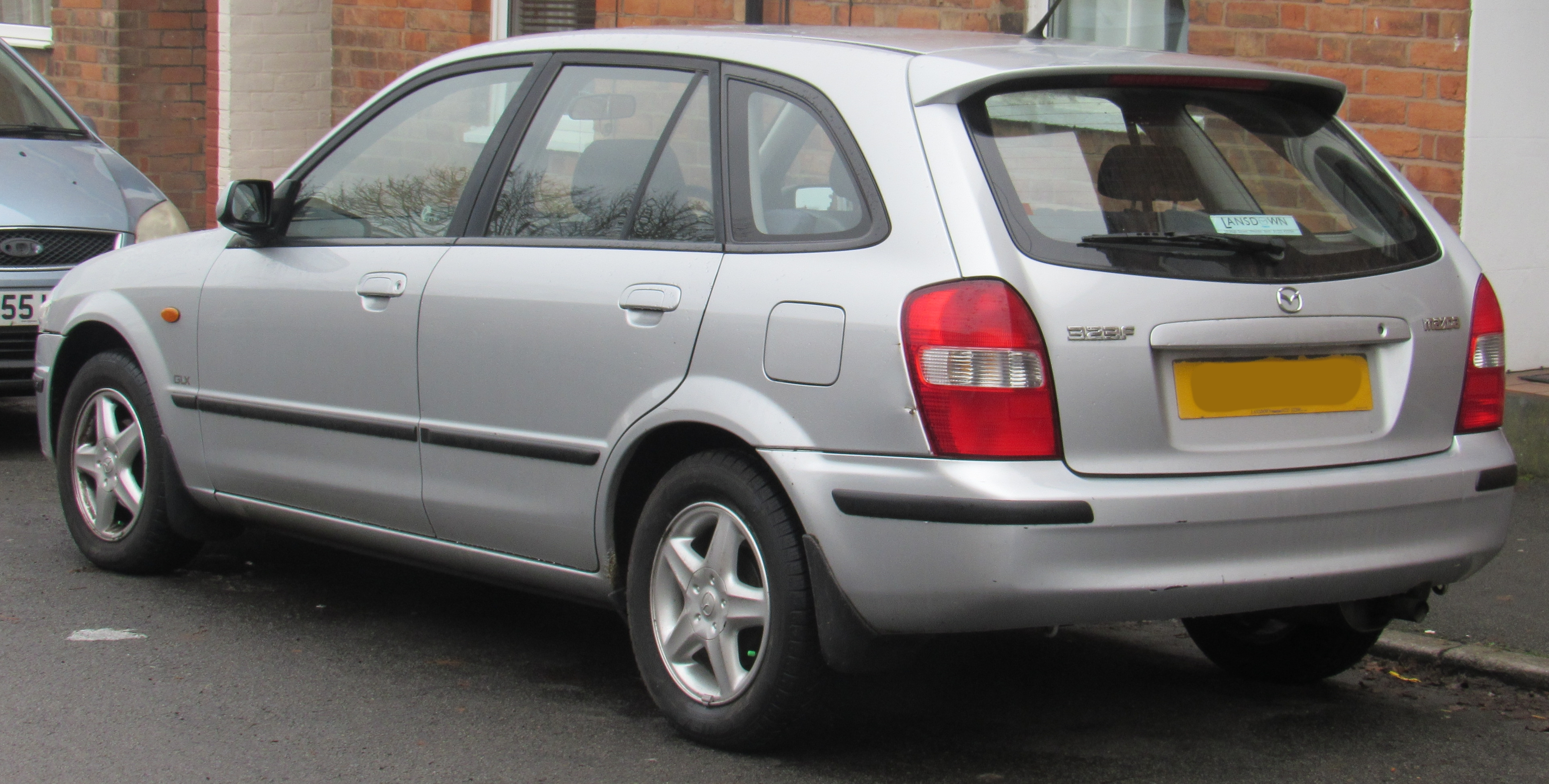
Pre-facelift Mazda 323F hatchback, 1999–2001

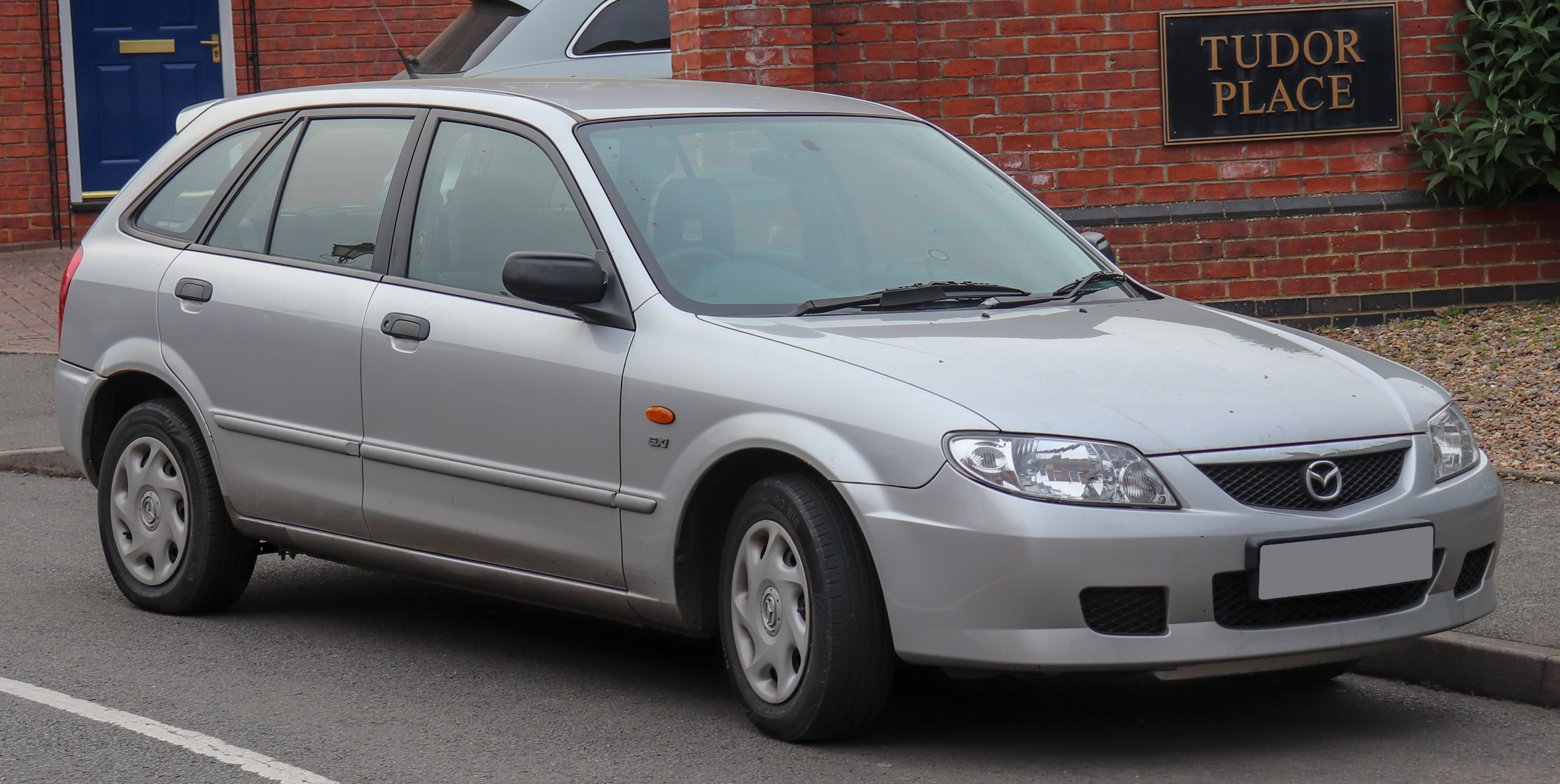
Facelift Mazda 323F hatchback, 2002–2003

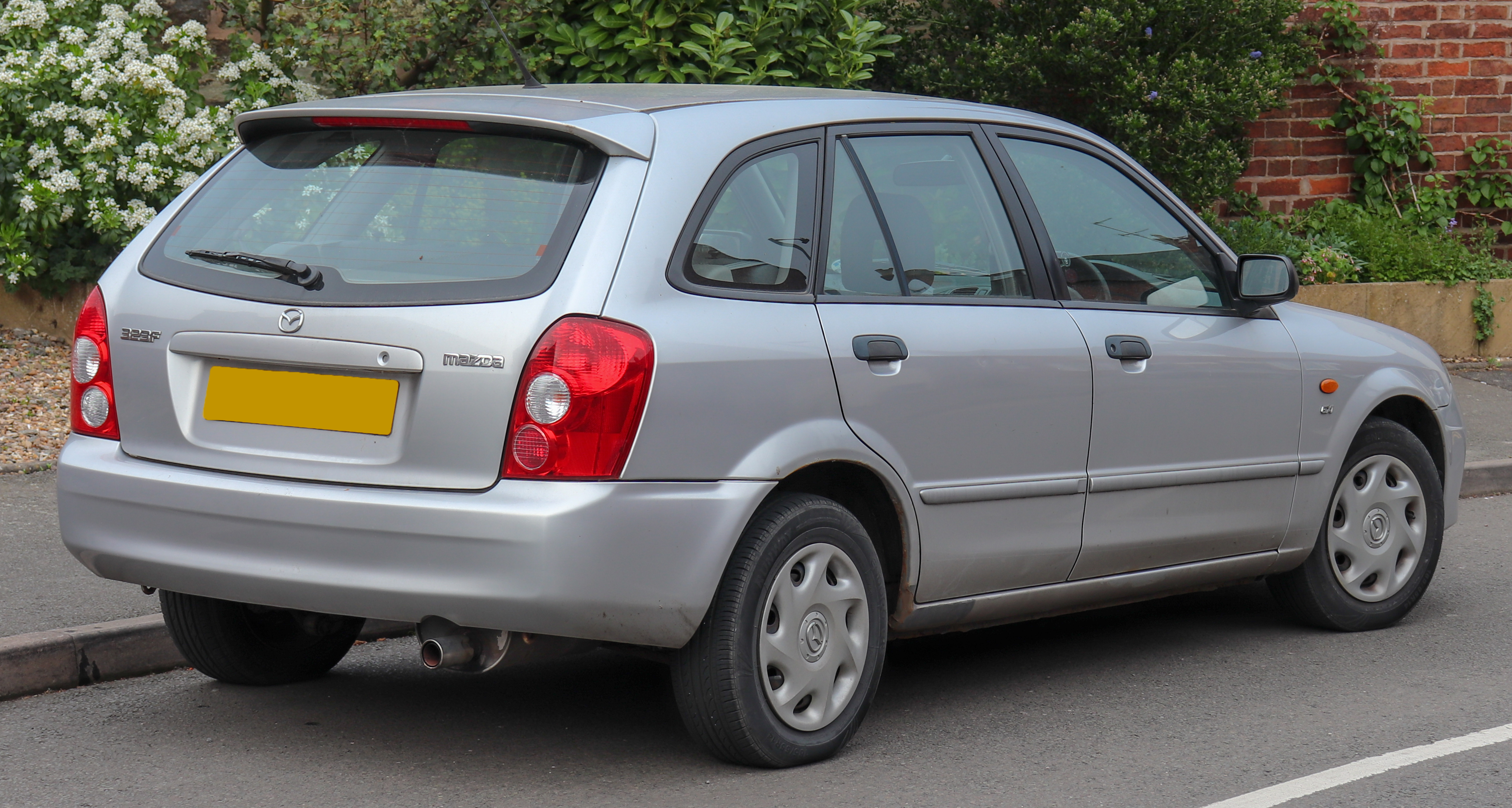
Facelift Mazda 323F hatchback, 2002–2003

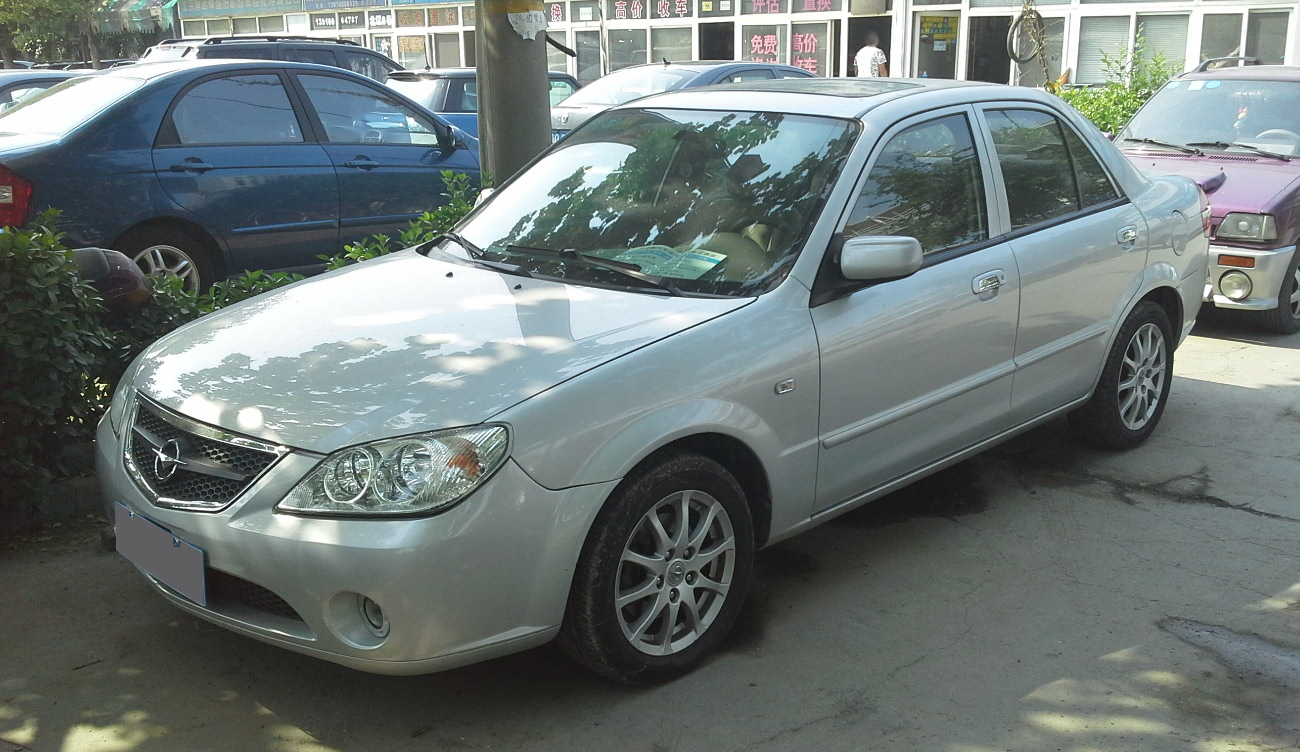
Haima Family front (China)

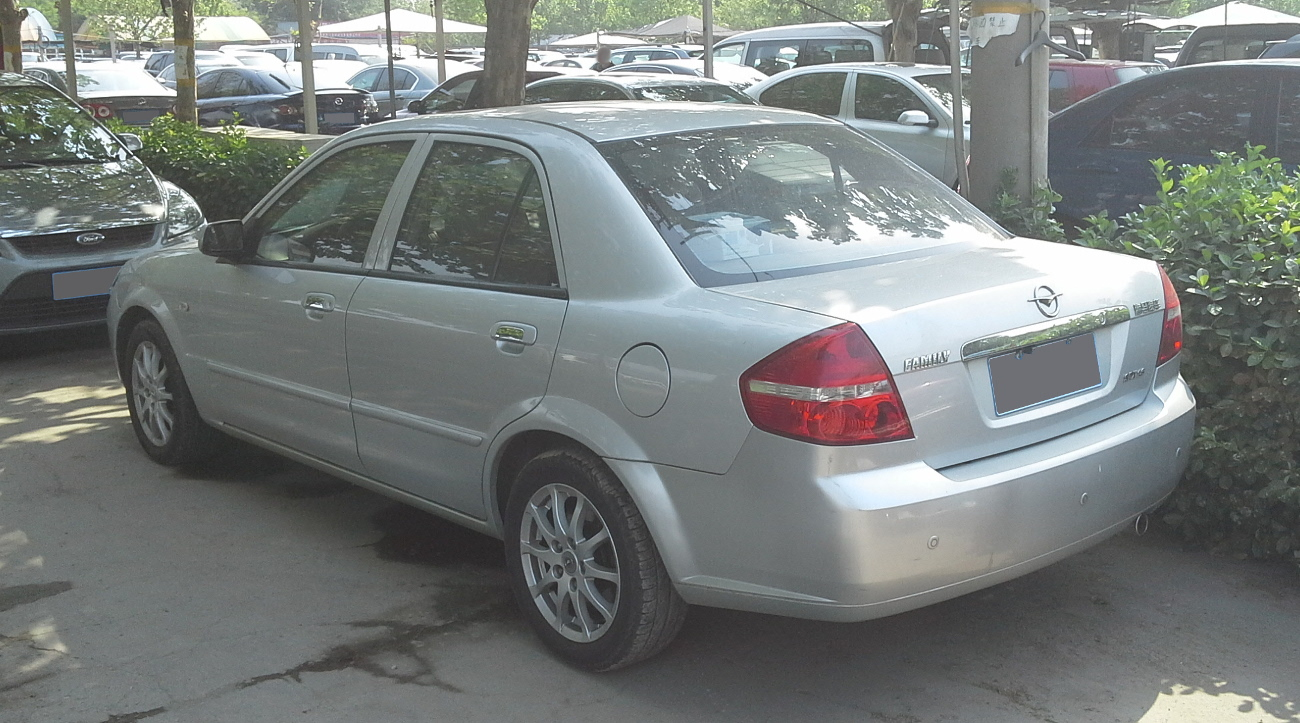
Haima Family rear (China)

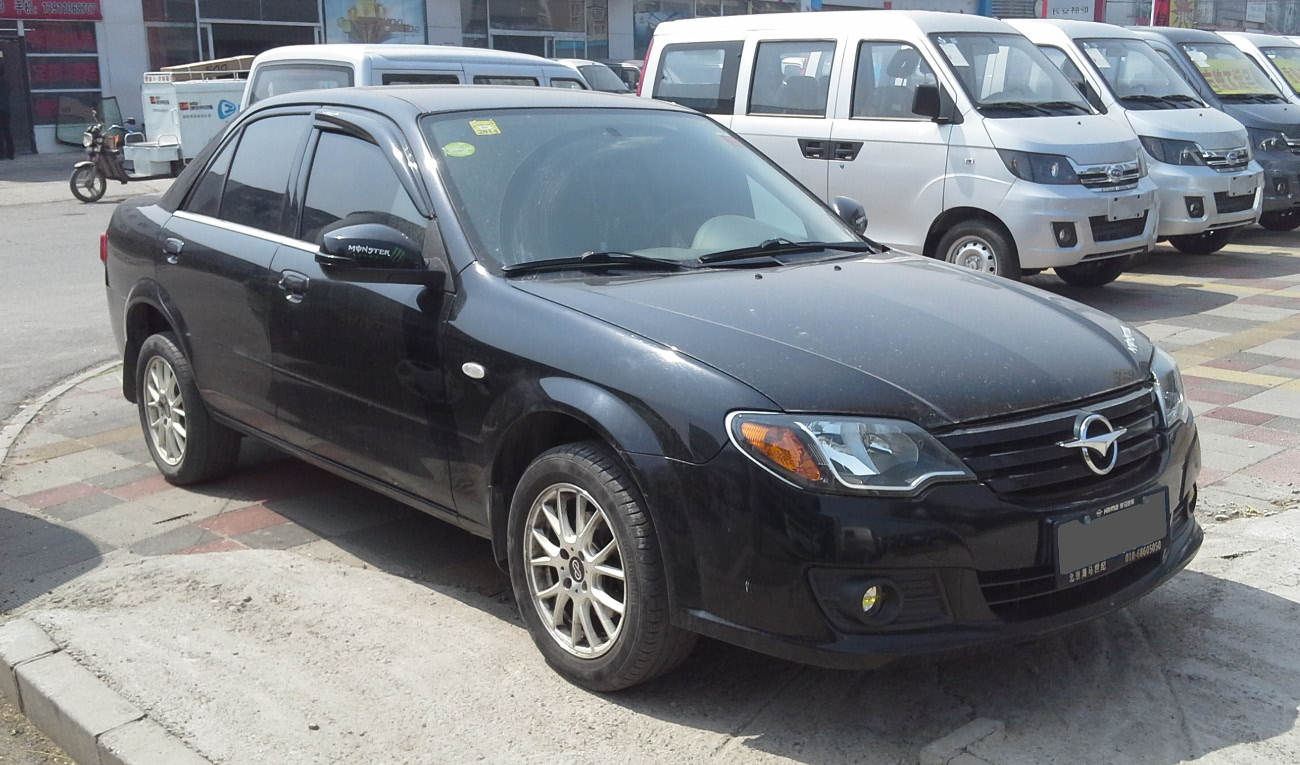
Haima Happin front (China)

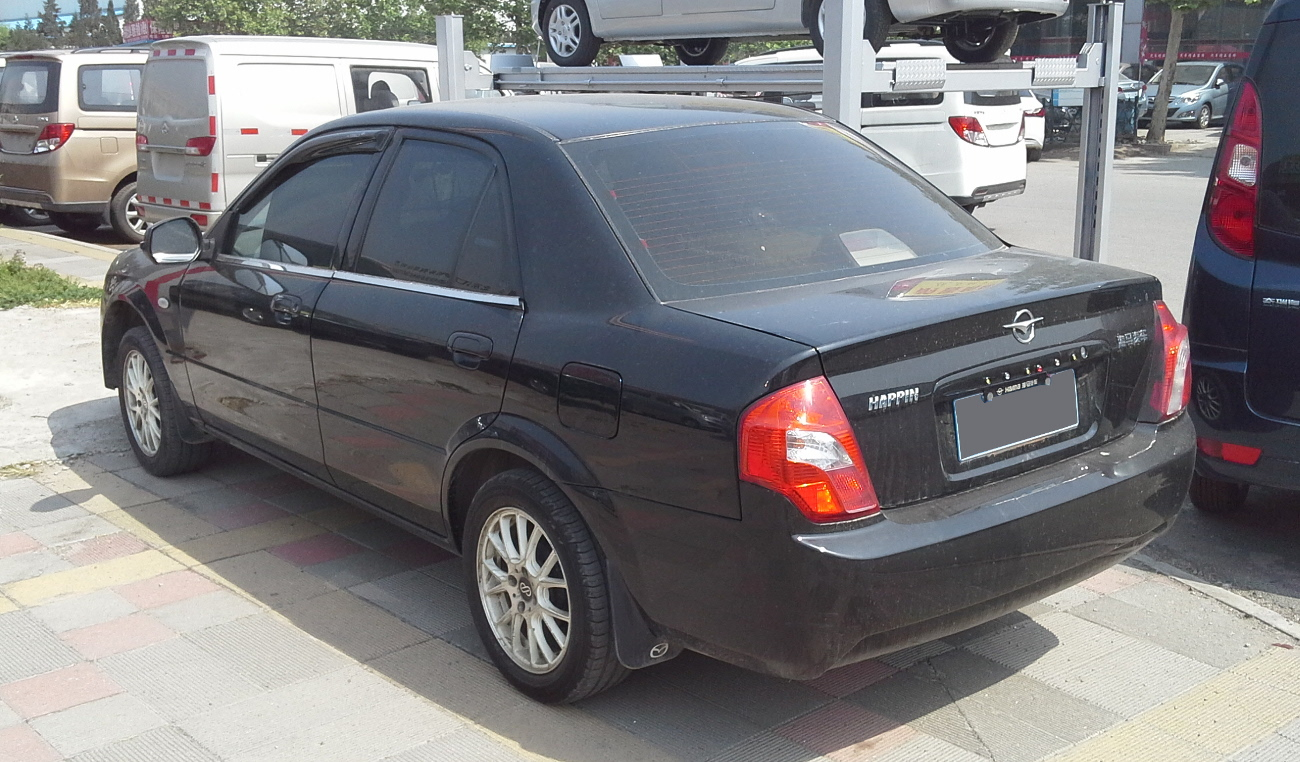
Haima Happin rear (China)
